= 2026 in Latvia =

- Decades: 2000s; 2010s; 2020s
- See also: Other events of 2026; Timeline of Latvian history

Events in the year 2026 in Latvia.

== Incumbents ==
- President: Edgars Rinkēvičs
- Prime Minister: Evika Siliņa (until 28 May); Andris Kulbergs onwards

== Events ==
=== January ===
- 2 January – Latvia assumes a two-year non-permanent seat at the United Nations Security Council.
- 18 January–8 February – UEFA Futsal Euro 2026 in Latvia, Lithuania and Slovenia.

=== February ===
- 3 February – The mayor of Ogre, Egils Helmanis, resigns citing health issues.

=== March ===
- 6 March – Latvia boycotts the opening ceremony of the 2026 Winter Paralympics in Italy in protest over Russian athletes being allowed to compete under the Russian flag after the lifting of sanctions imposed over the Russian invasion of Ukraine in 2022.
- 11 March – Curlers Poļina Rožkova and Agris Lasmans become the first athletes representing Latvia to win a medal in the Paralympics after achieving bronze in the mixed doubles curling at the 2026 Winter Paralympics in Italy.
- 25 March – A suspected Ukrainian drone crashes in Krāslava.

=== May ===
- 7 May – A drone originating from Russia crashes in Rezekne.
- 10 May – Defence Minister Andris Sprūds resigns following a demand by prime minister Siliņa following the drone incident at Rēzekne.
- 14 May – Prime Minister Evika Siliņa resigns after the Progressives withdraw support from the government.
- 28 May – Andris Kulbergs is confirmed as Prime Minister by the Saeima.

=== June ===
- 8 June – A drone is shot down by French fighter jets belonging to a NATO contingent over Latvian airspace. The incident is blamed by the Latvian Army on Russian interference.

=== August ===
- 14 August – A drone is shot down by a NATO fighter jet over Balvi Municipality. The incident is blamed by the Latvian Army on Russian interference.

=== September ===
- 13 September – Welfare Minister Reinis Uzulnieks is removed from office after being caught driving under the influence of alcohol.

=== October ===
- 3 October – 2026 Latvian parliamentary election: The ruling United List party of prime minister Andris Kulbergs wins a plurality of 41 seats in the 100-member Saeima.

== Holidays ==
- 1 January – New Year's Day
- 3 April – Good Friday
- 6 April – Easter Monday
- 1 May – Labour Day
- 4 May – Restoration of Independence Day
- 23 June – Midsummer
- 24 June – St. John's Day
- 18 November – Independence Day
- 24 December – Christmas Eve
- 25 December – Christmas Day
- 26 December – Boxing Day
- 31 December – New Year's Eve

== Art and entertainment ==
- List of Latvian submissions for the Academy Award for Best International Feature Film

== Deaths ==
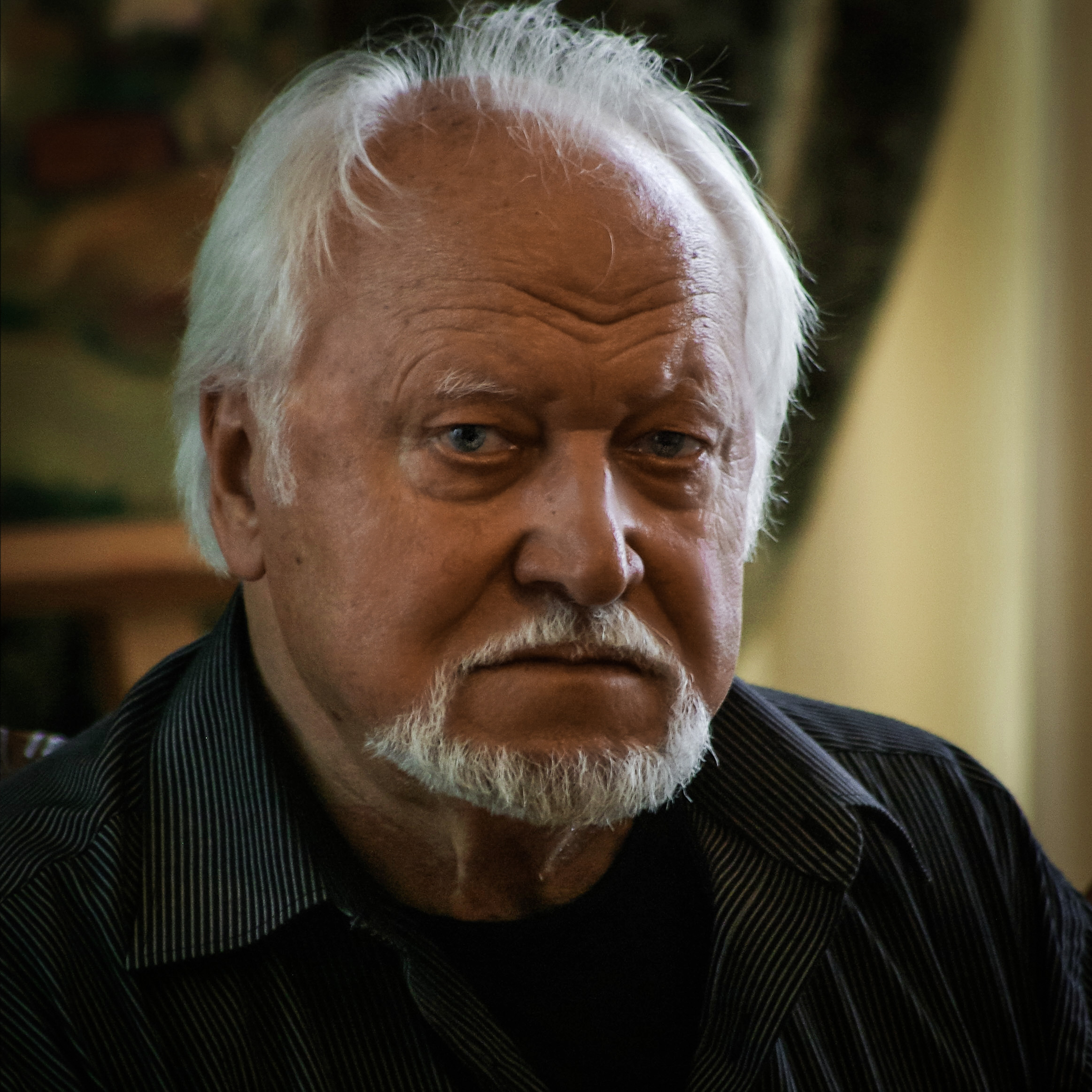
Jānis Streičs

- 1 January – Imants Freibergs, 91, computer scientist, first gentleman (1999–2007).
- 4 January – Nora Ikstena, 56, writer and cultural manager.
- 8 January – Uljana Semjonova, 73, basketball player, Olympic champion (1976, 1980).
- 23 January – Anda Zaice, 84, actress (Trial on the Road).
- 29 January – Raimonds Staprans, 99, Latvian-American visual artist and playwright.
- 5 March – Jānis Streičs, 89, film director (A Limousine the Colour of Midsummer's Eve, Cilvēka bērns).
- 11 April – Vija Vētra, 103, dancer and choreographer.
- 12 June – Pauls Butkēvičs, 85, actor (I Remember Everything, Richard, Four White Shirts, Long Road in the Dunes).
- 30 July – Marģers Vestermanis, 100, Holocaust survivor and historian.
- 7 September – Rihards Pīks, 84, politician and film director, MP (1998–2004), MEP (2004–2009) and minister of foreign affairs (2004).
- 19 October – Vladlens Dozorcevs, 87, member of the Supreme Council (1990–1993) and MP (1995–1998).

== See also ==
- 2026 in the European Union
- 2026 in Europe
