= 2025 in Latvia =

- Decades: 2000s; 2010s; 2020s
- See also: Other events of 2025; Timeline of Latvian history

Events in the year 2025 in Latvia.

== Incumbents ==
- President: Edgars Rinkēvičs
- Prime Minister: Evika Siliņa

== Events ==
=== January ===
- 1 January – Latvia bans the sale and use of tobacco and nicotine products for those under 20 years of age, effectively on this date.
- 1 January – A unified Public Broadcasting of Latvia begins operations following the merger of Latvian Radio and Latvian Television.

=== February ===
- 8–9 February – Latvia, along with Estonia and Lithuania disconnect from the Russian electric grid and joins the Synchronous grid of Continental Europe.
- 21 February – Prime Minister Evika Siliņa asks Ministers Kaspars Briškens, Anda Čakša, and Uldis Augulis to resign.

=== March ===
- 2 March – Flow, directed by Gints Zilbalodis, becomes the first Latvian film to win at the Academy Awards after being recognized as Best Animated Feature.
- 18 March – Latvia restricts traffic at its border crossings with Belarus and Russia to allow only motor vehicles to enter, citing an increase in refugees.

=== April ===
- 16 April – The Saeima votes to withdraw Latvia from the Ottawa Treaty on Landmines.

=== May ===
- 17 May – Latvia' s Tautumeitas finishes in 13th place at Eurovision 2025 in Switzerland with the single "Bur man laimi".
- 23 May – Latvia accedes to the Outer Space Treaty.

=== June ===
- 3 June – Latvia is elected to a rotating seat at the United Nations Security Council for the first time.
- 7 June – 2025 Latvian municipal elections

=== July ===
- 16 July – The mayor of Ogre, Egils Helmanis, is injured in a Russian drone strike in Ukraine during an official visit to provide aid to the Armed Forces of Ukraine.

=== August ===
- 1 August – Stricter restrictions on the sale of alcoholic beverages came into effect - they were no longer allowed to be sold after 20:00, and on Sundays after 18:00.
- 27 August–14 September – EuroBasket 2025 in Cyprus, Finland, Latvia and Poland

=== September ===
- 6 September – Canadian Armed Forces Warrant Officer George Hohl, who went missing near the Ādaži military base three days earlier while deployed to Latvia under NATO's Operation Reassurance, is found dead.
- 17 September – The State Security Service announces the arrest of a man on suspicion of spying for Russia.

=== October ===
- 30 October – The Saeima votes 56–32 to exit the Istanbul Convention, which combats domestic violence and violence against women. If Latvia leaves, it would make them the first European Union member to quit the treaty.

=== November ===
- 3 November – Authorities announce the arrest of a Latvian national on suspicion of spying for Russia.
- 6 November – At least 10,000 people protested at Dome Square in Old Riga against Latvia's withdrawal from the Istanbul Convention.

== Holidays ==
- 1 January – New Year's Day
- 19 April – Good Friday
- 21 April – Easter Monday
- 1 May – Labour Day
- 4 May – Restoration of Independence Day
- 23 June – Midsummer
- 24 June – St. John's Day
- 18 November – Independence Day
- 24 December – Christmas Eve
- 25 December – Christmas Day
- 26 December – Boxing Day
- 31 December – New Year's Eve

== Art and entertainment ==
- List of Latvian submissions for the Academy Award for Best International Feature Film

== Deaths ==
- 27 January – Jānis Peters, 85, poet, publicist, and diplomat.
- 1 May – Andrejs Prohorenkovs, 48, footballer.
- 6 October – Ziedonis Čevers, 65, politician.
- 17 November – Kārlis Bardelis, 40, adventurer and world traveler, six-time Guinness World Record holder.

== See also ==
- 2025 in the European Union
- 2025 in Europe
