= 2024 in Latvia =

- Decades: 2000s; 2010s; 2020s
- See also: Other events of 2024; Timeline of Latvian history

Events in the year 2024 in Latvia.

== Incumbents ==
- President: Edgars Rinkēvičs
- Prime Minister: Evika Siliņa

== Events ==
=== January ===
- 11 January – Latvia announces it will ban the sale and use of tobacco and nicotine products for those under 20 years of age, effective from 1 January 2025.

=== March ===
- 28 March – Foreign Minister Krišjānis Kariņš announces his resignation effective 10 April following a decision by the Latvian prosecutor general’s office to initiate criminal proceedings over the alleged misuse of public funds in the utilization of private aviation services by Kariņš and his delegations during his prime ministership.
- 31 March–6 April – 2024 IIHF Women's World Championship Division I B at Riga

=== April ===
- 19 April – Baiba Braže is confirmed as new Foreign Minister following the resignation of Krišjānis Kariņš.

=== June ===
- 8 June – 2024 European Parliament election.
- 17 June - Minister of Culture Agnese Logina resigns for personal reasons.
- 26 June – The leaders of Poland, Lithuania, Latvia, and Estonia call on the European Union to construct a €2.5 billion (US$2.67 billion) defence line between them and Russia and Belarus to secure the EU from military, economic, and migrant-related threats.

=== July ===
- 15 July – Latvia issues a ban on Belarus-registered passenger vehicles entering its territory from Belarus or Russia.
- 16 July – The Baltic states announce their exit from the Russian and Belarusian electricity grid along with plans to synchronize their grid with the continental Europe grid effective 9 February 2025.

=== September ===
- 7 September – A Russian military drone crashes in Rēzekne.

== Holidays ==
- 1 January - New Year's Day
- 29 March - Good Friday
- 1 April - Easter Monday
- 1 May - Labour Day
- 4 May - Restoration of Independence Day
- 23 June - Midsummer
- 24 June - St. John's Day
- 18 November - Independence Day
- 24 December - Christmas Eve
- 25 December - Christmas Day
- 26 December – Boxing Day
- 31 December – New Year's Eve

== Art and entertainment ==
- List of Latvian submissions for the Academy Award for Best International Feature Film

== Deaths ==
- 16 January – Dzintra Grundmane, 79, basketball player.
- 20 January – Inguna Bauere, 63, writer, engineer, and teacher.
- 25 January – Pēteris Cimdiņš, 79, biologist and politician
- 26 April – Alfrēds Čepānis, 80, politician, Speaker of the Saeima (1996–1998)
- 28 April – Andris Vilks, 60, politician, Minister of Finance of Latvia (2010–2014)
- 14 May – Baiba Indriksone, 92, actress
- 10 July – Jānis Straume, 61, politician and doctor, Speaker of the Saeima (1998–2002)
- 13 July – Ingrīda Ūdre, 65, politician, Speaker of the Saeima (2002–2006)
- 29 August – Ēvī Upeniece, 99, sculptor
- 9 October – Rasma Garne, 83, actress
- 9 November – Viesturs Meijers, 56, chess grandmaster
- 15 November – Romualds Kalsons, 88, composer
- 23 November – Haralds Vasiļjevs, 72, ice hockey player (Dinamo Riga) and coach (EHC Dortmund, national team).
- 30 November – Gunārs Placēns, 97, actor (The Silence of Dr. Evans)
- 17 December – Jānis Timma, 32, basketball player
- 17 December – Aigars Fadejevs, 48, athlete, Olympic silver medalist (2000)
- 22 December – Roze Stiebra, 82, animator

== See also ==
- 2024 in the European Union
- 2024 in Europe
