= 2027 in Latvia =

- Decades: 2000s; 2010s; 2020s
- See also: Other events of 2027; Timeline of Latvian history

Events in the year 2027 in Latvia.

== Events ==
=== Predicted and scheduled ===
- 10 July – Eurovision Young Musicians 2027
- TBA – 2027 UEFA European Under-17 Championship in Latvia

== Holidays ==
- 1 January – New Year's Day
- 26 March – Good Friday
- 29 March – Easter Monday
- 1 May – Labour Day
- 4 May – Restoration of Independence Day
- 23 June – Midsummer
- 24 June – St. John's Day
- 18 November – Independence Day
- 24 December – Christmas Eve
- 25 December – Christmas Day
- 26 December – Boxing Day
- 31 December – New Year's Eve

== Art and entertainment ==
- List of Latvian submissions for the Academy Award for Best International Feature Film

== See also ==
- 2027 in the European Union
- 2027 in Europe
