= Public holidays in Latvia =

This is a list of holidays in Latvia.

Date	English name	Local name	Notes
1 January	New Year's Day	Jaungada diena	
Moveable Friday	Good Friday	Lielā Piektdiena	
Moveable Sunday	Easter Sunday	Pirmās Lieldienas	
Moveable Monday	Easter Monday	Otrās Lieldienas	
1 May	Labour Day	Darba svētki	
1 May	Day of the Convocation of the Constituent Assembly of the Republic of Latvia	Latvijas Republikas Satversmes sapulces sasaukšanas diena	
4 May	Restoration of Independence Day	Latvijas Republikas Neatkarības atjaunošanas diena	On 4 May 1990, Latvia proclaimed its independence from the USSR. If the day falls on the weekend, the next Monday is a holiday.
Second Sunday of May	Mother's Day	Mātes diena	
Moveable Sunday	Pentecost	Vasarsvētki	
23 June	Līgo Day	Līgo diena	
24 June	Jāņi Day	Jāņu diena	
18 November	Proclamation Day of the Republic of Latvia	Latvijas Republikas Proklamēšanas diena	The independence of Latvia was proclaimed on this day in 1918. If the day falls on the weekend, the next Monday is a holiday.
24 December	Christmas Eve	Ziemassvētku vakars	This is when gifts are traditionally exchanged.
25 December	Christmas Day	Pirmie Ziemassvētki	
26 December	Second Day of Christmas	Otrie Ziemassvētki	
31 December	New Year's Eve	Vecgada diena	
