= Dzintars =

Latvian masculine given name

- Gender: Male
- Name day: 4 September

Origin
- Meaning: amber
- Region of origin: Latvia

Other names
- Related names: Dzintra

Dzintars is a Latvian masculine given name borne by more than 4,000 men in Latvia. (Note: The female equivalent is Dzintra, with a rare alternative form, Dzintara.)

The name means "amber". Its nameday is celebrated on 4 September. It is one of the relatively few surviving names of indigenous origin from the very great number either newly introduced, as Dzintars was, or revived during the Latvian National Awakening of the late 19th and early 20th centuries.

== Individuals ==
The name Dzintars may refer to:

- Dzintars Ābiķis (born 1952), Latvian politician
- Dzintars Čīča (born 1993), Latvian singer
- Dzintars Jaundžeikars (1956–2022), Latvian politician
- Dzintars Krišjānis (born 1958), Latvian rower and Olympic competitor
- Dzintars Lācis (1940–1992), Latvian cyclist and Olympic competitor
- Dzintars Rasnačs (born 1963), Latvian politician
- Dzintars Sproģis (born 1971), Latvian footballer
- Dzintars Zilgalvis (born 1956), Latvian visual artist
- Dzintars Zirnis (born 1977), Latvian footballer

As a surname

- Raivis Dzintars (born 1982), Latvian politician

== See also ==
- Dzintar Klavan, Estonian footballer
