= Timeline of Latvian history =

Legal, territorial and political event timeline in Latvia

This is a timeline of Latvian history, comprising important legal and territorial changes and political events in Latvia and its predecessor states. To read about the background to these events, see History of Latvia. See also the list of presidents of Latvia.

== 7th century ==
Year	Date	Event
650		The Curonians and Livonians were paying tribute to king Ivar Vidfamne of Scania

== 8th century ==
Year	Date	Event
750		In the legendary Battle of Brávellir Curonians were fighting at the side of Sigurd Hring, king of Sweden, and Livonians under their duke Ger (Ger Livicus) at the side of Harald Wartooth, king of Denmark. According to Norna-Gests þáttr Sigurd Hring fought against the invading Curonians (Kúrir) in the southern part of what today is Sweden
before 800		The ancient Balts began to form specific tribal realms.

== 9th century ==
Year	Date	Event
800		The Curonians had rebelled against the Swedes and refused to pay them tribute.
850		The Danish king marshalled a great fleet and sailed to Courland in order to take over their goods and to make the Curonians pay tribute to instead. The Curonians gathered forces from all five of their towns and butchered half the Danish army and plundered their war ships.
854		King Olaf of Sweden with 7,000 armed men attacked towns of Seeburg and Apulia. Curonians declared that they wished to be the subjects of the Swedish kings as in former times.
870		The legendary Danish king Hadingus wages wars in the Baltic and achieves victory against king Handwanus of Duna (Duna urbs), however, suffering defeat against Curonian tyrant Loker (Loker, Curetum tyrannus)
890		The Curonian king Dorno (Curetum rex Dorno), one of the legendary kings in Saxo Grammaticus' Gesta Danorum, fights against the legendary Danish king Frotho I.

== 10th century ==
Year	Date	Event
925		Egils Saga describes the expedition of Icelandic vikings Thorolf and Egill Skallagrímsson by the Eastern route (Austrvegr), where they won much wealth and had many battles. In Courland they made a peace for half a month and traded with the men of the land.
950		The Norse prince Ragnvald (Rogvolod of Polatsk) came from overseas and subjugated hillforts along the river of Daugava. His capital was established at Polatsk.

== 11th century ==
Year	Date	Event
before 1100		The borders of the Baltic realms of Courland, Semigallia, Tālava, Koknese and Jersika (known as Lettia) became settled. Latvia

== 12th century ==
Year	Date	Event
1106		Semigallians completely destroyed united armies of the sons of Prince Vseslav of Polotsk in the lowlands of Daugava.
1111		Prince of Novgorod Mstislav Vladimirovich invaded eastern part of Tālava (Adzele) and Ugandi.
1180		Prince Mstislav Rostislavich led the Novgorodians against the Letts of Tālava.
1184		The monk Saint Meinhard began missionary work among the Livonian people.
1186		Meinhard was appointed bishop of Livonia by the Pope.
1198		Bishop Berthold of Hanover arrived at the mouth of the Daugava River accompanied by crusaders and was killed in battle with Livonians.
1199		Albert of Riga was elected the third bishop of Livonia.
1199		Pope Innocent III proclaimed a second Baltic Crusade.

== 13th century ==
Year	Date	Event
1201		Albert founded Riga on the site of earlier Livonian settlement.
1202		The Catholic military order of Livonian Brothers of the Sword was founded by Bishop Albert.
1206		The Brothers of the Sword and their Semigallian allies defeated Livonians at Turaida
1217		The Brothers of the Sword and their Livonian and Latgalian allies defeated Estonians at the Battle of St. Matthew's Day near Viljandi.
1229		Bishop Albert died.
1236		Battle of Saule: The Brothers of the Sword were defeated in the Land of Saule (terra Sauleorum) by combined forces of Samogitians and Semigallians.
1242		Alexander Nevsky defeated the Livonian Order on Lake Peipus.
1255		The Bishopric at Riga was elevated to become the Archbishopric of Riga.
1282		Riga became a member of the Hanseatic League.

== 14th century ==
Year	Date	Event
1378		The Livonian Order raided Upytė, and another campaign threatened the Lithuanian capital in Vilnius.

== 15th century ==
Year	Date	Event
1422		A Livonian Diet first met.
1452		The Livonian Order and Archbishopric of Riga began to rule jointly in Livonia.
1481		Muscovy attacked Livonia.

== 16th century ==
Year	Date	Event
1501		The Livonian Order, aided by Lithuania, launched an attack on Pskov.
1502		Russian troops were defeated at the Battle of Lake Smolina near Palkino.
1558		Ivan the Terrible launched an attack on Livonia.
1561		Livonian War: Livonia fell to Lithuania.
1569		Lithuania and Poland joined to form the Polish–Lithuanian Commonwealth. Livonia became a joint domain administered directly by both realms.

== 17th century ==
Year	Date	Event
1629		The Peace of Altmark was reached, under which Sweden annexed Livonia and several Courland territories to Swedish Livonia.
1689		The Old and New Testaments were published in Latvian translation by Pastor Ernst Glück.
1700		Great Northern War: A war began which involved the Polish–Lithuanian Commonwealth, Sweden, and Russia.

== 18th century ==
Year	Date	Event
1710		Riga fell to the Russians, though Courland remained under the control of the Polish–Lithuanian Commonwealth.
1721		Great Northern War: The Treaty of Nystadt ended the war.

== 19th century ==
Year	Date	Event
1841		A famine occurred in Livonia.
1873		The first Latvian Song and Dance Festival took place.
1887		Russification measures began in the Baltic governorates of the Russian Empire.

== 20th century ==
Year	Date	Event
1905	13 January	Russian army troops opened fire on demonstrators in Riga, killing seventy-three and injuring two hundred people.
1905		A revolution took place in the Baltic region directed primarily against German landowners and Russian autocracy.
1914	1 August	World War I: The war began.
1918	18 November	An independent Latvia was proclaimed.
1919		Latvian rouble currency introduced.
1920	11 August	The Latvian–Soviet Peace Treaty was signed.
1921	22 September	Latvia became a member of the League of Nations.
1922	February	A Latvian constitution was adopted.
1934	15 May	Prime Minister Kārlis Ulmanis took power in a bloodless coup d'état.
1939	23 August	The Molotov–Ribbentrop Pact was signed between the Soviet Union (USSR) and Nazi Germany.
1940	16 June	An ultimatum was presented by the USSR to Latvia.
1940	17 June	Soviet occupation of Latvia in 1940: Soviet troops occupied the country.
1940	5 August	Latvia was incorporated into the Soviet Union, becoming the Latvian Soviet Socialist Republic (SSR).
1941	14 June	The first mass deportations of Latvians to various sites in the Soviet Union began.
1941	1 July	Occupation of Latvia by Nazi Germany: Nazi troops occupied Riga.
1944	October	Occupation of Latvia by Soviet Union 1944-1945: The Soviet army reentered Riga.
1955		About thirty thousand deportees returned to Latvia from the USSR under a general amnesty.
1981		The modern Vanšu Bridge was opened across the Daugava River in Riga.
1987	14 June	The first demonstration in Riga to commemorate the 1941 deportations took place.
1988	23 August	Mass demonstrations took place against the Molotov–Ribbentrop Pact.
1990	4 May	The Latvian SSR Supreme Council adopted the declaration On the Restoration of Independence of the Republic of Latvia.
1991	January	The Barricades: Pro-Communist political forces attempted to restore Soviet power in Latvia.
1991	6 September	The Soviet Union recognized Latvian independence.
1991	17 September	Latvia became a member of the United Nations.

== 21st century ==
Year	Date	Event
2004	29 March	Latvia became a member of NATO.
2004	2003 september- latvia referendum vote gives strong backing to eu membership.	

2004 March - Latvia joins Nato.

2004 May - Latvia is one of 10 new states joining the European Union.

2006 August - New citizenship law requires applicants to pass Latvian language test.

Financial crisis 2008 December - International Monetary Fund (IMF) approves 1.68bn euro rescue package to help Latvia ride out severe economic slump.

2009 January - Hundreds of demonstrators clash with police in Riga as anti-government protests over the terms of the IMF rescue package turn violent.

2010 January - Unemployment soars to 20%, giving Latvia the highest jobless rate in the EU.

2011 September - Pro-Russian Harmony Centre emerges as largest party in snap elections, but coalition government excludes it.

2012 February - Referendum on giving Russian joint official language status rejected by a large margin.

2014 January - Latvia joins the eurozone.2014 September - US President Barack Obama visits Estonia to reassure the Baltic states that they can count on Nato protection, amid tensions following Russia's seizure of Crimea.

2014 October - Centre-right coalition wins a clear majority in parliamentary elections dominated by concern about Russia's intervention in Ukraine and its influence in the Baltic region.

2015 March - Nato reinforces its presence in the Baltic states and its forces conduct major military drills in the region.

2019 January - Arturs Krisjanis Karins becomse prime minister of a centre-right coalition, excluding the pro-Russia Harmony party that had emerged as the largest bloc after October 2018 parliamentary elections.

2022 February - Russia invades Ukraine

2022 August - Latvia declares state of emergency along its border with Belarus over sharp climb in illegal border-crossing attempts.

== See also ==
- List of years in Latvia
- Timeline of Riga
