= Dzintra =

Female given name

- Gender: Female
- Name day: September 4

Origin
- Meaning: From dzintars – "amber"
- Region of origin: Latvia

Other names
- Related names: Dzintars

Dzintra is a Latvian feminine given name. The associated name day is September 4.

== Notable people named Dzintra ==
- Dzintra Blūma (born 1958), Latvian Olympic canoeist
- Dzintra Grundmane (born 1944), Latvian basketball player
