= 2016 in Latvia =

- Decades: 1990s; 2000s; 2010s; 2020s
- See also: Other events of 2016; Timeline of Latvian history

== Incumbents ==
Position	Person	Remarks
President of Latvia	Raimonds Vējonis	
Prime Minister of Latvia	Laimdota Straujuma (till February 11)	Second Straujuma cabinet
Prime Minister of Latvia	Māris Kučinskis (from February 11)	Kučinskis cabinet
Speaker of the Saeima	Ināra Mūrniece	

== Events ==
=== January ===
- January 20 — Heart surgery was performed to President of Latvia Raimonds Vējonis

=== August ===
- August 5–21 - Latvia competed in the 2016 Summer Olympics in Rio de Janeiro, Brazil

=== December ===
- December 3–11 — 2016 Men's World Floorball Championships took place in Latvia.

== Deaths ==
- January 4 — Rūsiņš Mārtiņš Freivalds, computer scientist and mathematician (b. 1942)
- April 9 — Juris Ekmanis, President of Latvian Academy of Sciences (b. 1941)
- April 22 — Ojārs Grīnbergs, singer (b. 1942)
- August 22 — Jānis Reinis, actor (b. 1960)
- November 29 — Ruta Šaca-Marjaša, lawyer, writer, poet, and politician (b. 1927)
