= 2025 Latvian protests =

2025 protests in Latvia against proposed withdrawal from the Istanbul Convention

2025 Latvian protests against withdrawal from the Istanbul Convention
- Protesters at Dome Square in Riga, 6 November 2025
- Date: October–November 2025; 2 October 2025 – 6 November 2025 (main wave)
- Location: Latvia (primarily Riga, with events in other cities and abroad)
- Caused by: Parliamentary moves toward withdrawal from the Istanbul Convention; Concerns over protections against violence against women and domestic violence; Political debate over gender-related concepts and national values ahead of elections
- Goals: Prevention of Latvia's withdrawal from the Istanbul Convention; Retention of existing legal and support frameworks for victims of violence; Maintenance of international human rights commitments
- Result: Withdrawal process suspended; bill returned by the president and deferred until after the 2026 parliamentary elections

Parties
Saeima minority opposing withdrawal (part of the governing coalition); New Unity; The Progressives; Civil society organisations and public; Centrs Marta; "Nosargāsim Māti Latviju" (Let Us Defend Mother Latvia) movement; Women's rights, human rights and LGBTQI+ groups; members of the public including families and diaspora communities	Saeima majority supporting withdrawal (opposition parties and part of the governing coalition); Latvia First; National Alliance; United List; For Stability!; Union of Greens and Farmers (coalition partner)

The 2025 Latvian protests against withdrawal from the Istanbul Convention were a series of demonstrations in Latvia opposing parliamentary efforts to withdraw from the Council of Europe Convention on Preventing and Combating Violence Against Women and Domestic Violence (commonly known as the Istanbul Convention). The protests formed one of the largest waves of public mobilisation in Latvia in recent years and peaked in late October and early November 2025.

Latvia signed the convention on 18 May 2016 and ratified it on 30 November 2023; it entered into force on 1 May 2024. On 30 October 2025 the Saeima voted 56–32 (with 2 abstentions) to adopt a law providing for withdrawal after a debate of more than 13 hours. The initiative originated with opposition parties, particularly Latvia First, and received support from other opposition groups and the coalition partner Union of Greens and Farmers. Supporters of withdrawal argued that the convention had become an ideological instrument promoting contested concepts of “social gender” and that resources would be better directed to national programmes. Opponents maintained that it provided essential, internationally monitored protections against violence and that withdrawal would damage Latvia’s reputation and legal framework.

Public opposition included street protests, a citizen petition that gathered more than 60,000–67,000 signatures (the most-signed initiative in the history of the ManaBalss.lv platform), and expressions of concern from European institutions and diplomats. On 3 November 2025 President Edgars Rinkēvičs declined to promulgate the law and returned it to the Saeima for reconsideration—the first time he had exercised this power during his presidency—citing insufficient factual justification, disregard for the position of the Cabinet of Ministers, and risks to legal certainty and international standing. On 5 November the Saeima deferred further consideration until after the October 2026 elections.

== Background ==
The Istanbul Convention, adopted by the Council of Europe in 2011, requires states parties to prevent and combat violence against women and domestic violence through legislation, support services and other measures. Latvia signed it on 18 May 2016 (represented by Minister of Welfare Jānis Reirs) and ratified it on 30 November 2023 after prolonged debate, including a 2021 Constitutional Court ruling that affirmed its compatibility with the Latvian Constitution. Upon ratification Latvia entered an interpretative declaration; several other states parties formally objected to it.

In September 2025 opposition deputies, led by Latvia First, initiated the withdrawal process. On 25 September the Saeima voted 55–33 to begin the procedure. Supporters argued that the convention had become an ideological instrument rather than an effective tool against violence and that a national framework would be preferable. On 16 October the Saeima adopted a non-binding parliamentary declaration on the prevention and elimination of violence against women and domestic violence (supported by 56 votes, with the Progressives opposing and New Unity largely not participating), which tasked the government with preparing comprehensive national legislation by March 2026. Critics of the declaration, including New Unity and the Progressives, stated that it lacked the binding force and monitoring mechanisms of an international convention.

On 23 October the Saeima approved the withdrawal bill in first reading by 52 votes and designated it urgent (expedited procedure with only two readings). The final reading was scheduled for 30 October.

Smaller protests against the proposal began in early October, including a gathering of several hundred people outside the Saeima on 2 October.

== Events ==
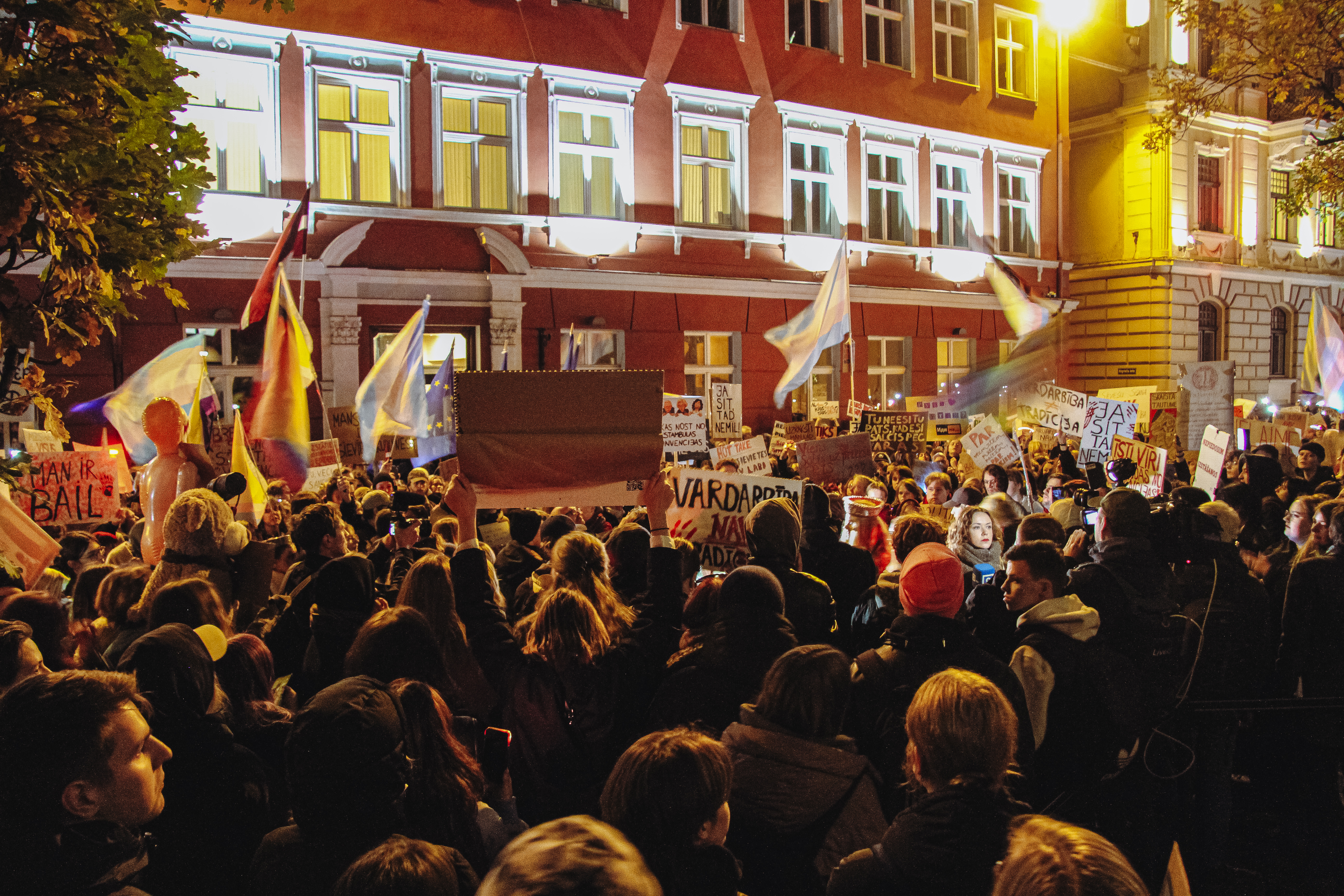
Protest against the denunciation of Istanbul Convention in Riga (October 2025)

On 29 October 2025, the day before the final parliamentary vote, an estimated 3,000–5,000 people protested outside the Saeima in Riga. Participants held signs opposing withdrawal, waved Latvian, European Union and Pride flags, and included many younger people as well as families. The demonstration was organised by Centrs Marta and other civil-society groups. A much smaller counter-demonstration of about 20 people, organised by the extra-parliamentary party Sovereign Power, expressed support for withdrawal.

On 30 October the Saeima adopted the withdrawal law by 56 votes to 32 with 2 abstentions. Prime Minister Evika Siliņa (New Unity) addressed protesters and opposed the decision. A citizen petition on ManaBalss.lv calling on the president not to sign the law rapidly collected tens of thousands of signatures and eventually exceeded 60,000–67,000, becoming the most-supported initiative in the platform’s history.

On 3 November, after the petition had surpassed 60,000 signatures, President Rinkēvičs returned the bill to the Saeima. On 5 November parliament suspended proceedings and set a deadline of 1 November 2026 for the submission of proposals, effectively deferring the matter until after the next elections.

Despite the deferral, a major demonstration under the slogan “Nosargāsim Māti Latviju” (Let Us Defend Mother Latvia) took place on 6 November 2025. Police estimated at least 10,000 participants at Dome Square in Riga, with crowds spilling into surrounding streets; the event was described as roughly twice the size of the 29 October protest and one of the largest in recent Latvian history. Parallel gatherings occurred in other cities (approximately 600 in Liepāja, 270 in Cēsis and 50 in Daugavpils) and among the Latvian diaspora in at least 13 European cities as well as the United States, Canada and elsewhere. Many participants wore red, carried homemade signs referencing the Freedom Monument, and chanted slogans critical of the parliamentary decision. The events remained largely peaceful; only two people were detained in Riga (one for disorderly conduct and disobeying police, one for assault on a participant).

Civil-society organisations working on violence prevention and related issues reported smear campaigns and restricted participation in some parliamentary discussions during the period.

== Aftermath and impact ==
The protests and petition contributed to the suspension of the withdrawal process. The issue remains politically contested and is widely expected to feature in the 2026 election campaign. International bodies, including the Parliamentary Assembly of the Council of Europe, expressed concern about the initial vote and the role of disinformation. The European Commission noted that Latvia remained bound by existing international obligations concerning the protection of women.

Observers described the mobilisation as a significant expression of civil-society engagement involving a broad demographic spectrum that included younger participants (especially at the 29 October event), families and diaspora communities, though it was not framed primarily as a generational movement.

== See also ==
- Istanbul Convention
- Violence against women
- Politics of Latvia
