= 2017 in Latvia =

- Decades: 1990s; 2000s; 2010s; 2020s
- See also: Other events of 2017; Timeline of Latvian history

Events in the year 2017 in Latvia.

== Incumbents ==
- President: Raimonds Vējonis
- Prime Minister: Māris Kučinskis

== Events ==
- 22 July – the Eurovision Choir of the Year 2017 was held in Riga, with Latvia placing third.

== Deaths ==
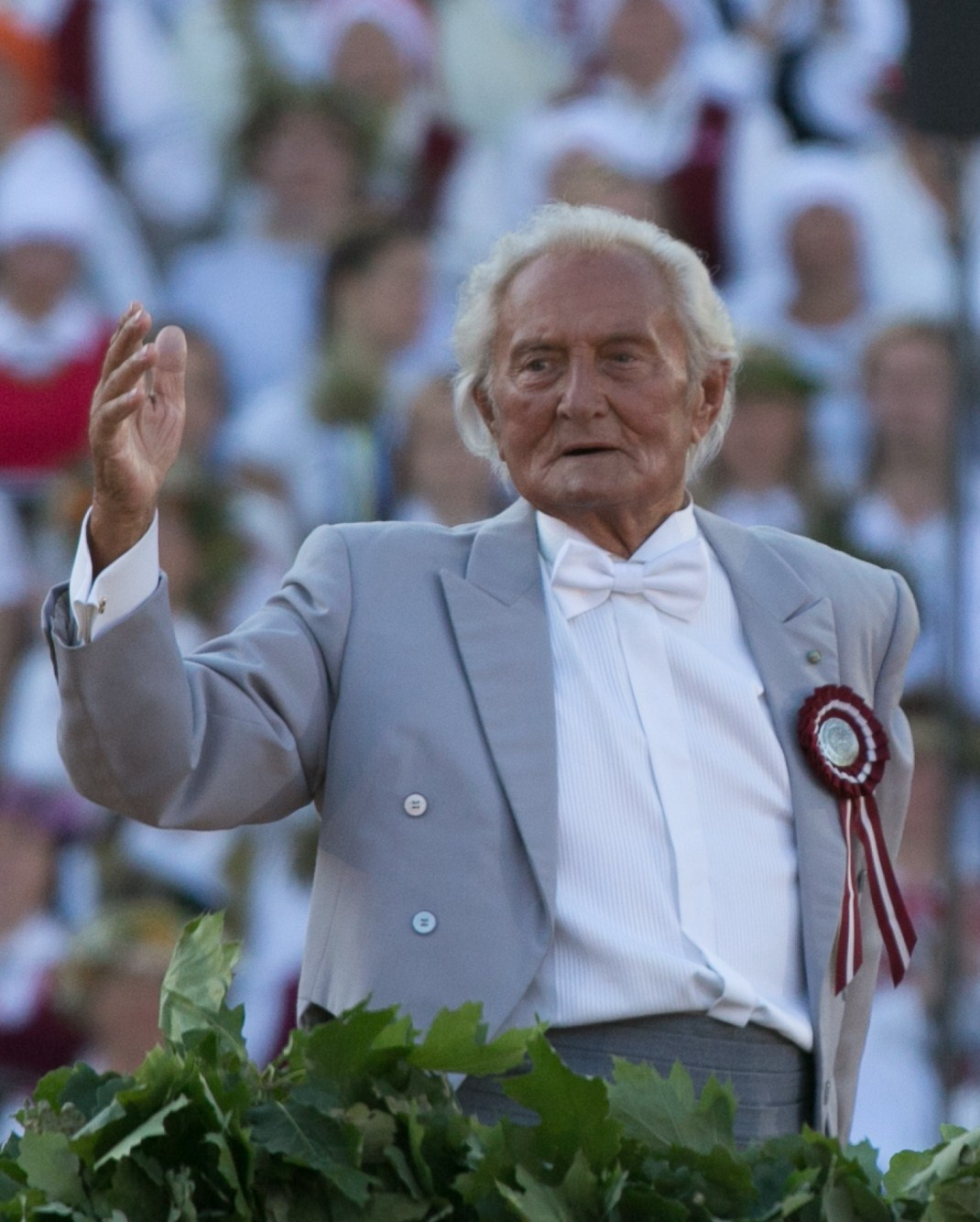
Gido Kokars

- 21 January – Biruta Baumane, painter (born 1922).
- 10 March – Gido Kokars, conductor (born 1921).
- 8 August — Pēteris Plakidis, composer (born 1947).
- 15 August — Gunārs Birkerts, architect (born 1925).
- 10 September — Konstantins Pupurs, historian, linguist, political scientist and activist (born 1964).
- 7 December — Žermēna Heine-Vāgnere, operatic soprano (born 1923).
