= 2021 in Latvia =

- Decades: 2000s; 2010s; 2020s
- See also: Other events of 2021; Timeline of Latvian history

Events in the year 2021 in Latvia.

== Incumbents ==
- President: Egils Levits
- Prime Minister: Arturs Krišjānis Kariņš

== Events ==
Ongoing — COVID-19 pandemic in Latvia

=== January ===
- 1 January – Public Broadcasting of Latvia leaves the advertising market thanks to state funding.
- 7 January –
  - The National Alliance submits to the Saeima a draft law regarding an amendment to the Constitution, which intends to strictly define the concept of family as a union of a male and a female person.
  - Health Minister Ilze Viņķele resigns over a COVID-19 vaccination plan, Artis Pabriks declines the interim role, and a successor is sought.

=== February ===
- 2 February – Riga is confirmed as the sole host of the 2021 IIHF Ice Hockey World Championship after Minsk withdraws from the running.
- 11 February – Latvian authorities ban retransmission of Russian Rossija RTR TV channel for a year for incitement of hatred, violence, and provocation of military conflict.
- 22 February – Ventspils mayor Aivars Lembergs is sentenced to five years in prison for bribery and money laundering. His son and business partner receive two-year sentences, with their assets also confiscated.

=== April ===
- 28 April – Riga hostel fire: A fire at an illegal Riga hostel kills 9 and injures 8; authorities open a criminal investigation and order the hostel to close.

=== May ===
- 24 May – Belarus expel Latvia’s embassy staff after opposition flags are raised in Riga. PM Krišjānis Kariņš calls it a “completely asymmetrical reaction.”

=== June ===
- 5 June – The 2021 Latvian municipal elections are held.

=== July ===
- 6 July – Latvia participates in the Cannes Film Festival, presenting Maria’s Silence and four short films in Baltic Shorts.

=== August ===
- 23 August – Opponents of mandatory COVID-19 vaccination organize an event called “Baltic Way 2021,” echoing the historic 1989 Baltic Way. Organizers claim over 900,000 signed up, and police estimate around 7,000 participants in Riga, with the human chain lasting 15–20 minutes.

=== November ===
- 15 November – A new rule comes into effect in the Latvian parliament (Saeima) requiring MPs to be vaccinated against COVID-19 or have recovered from the virus to participate in parliamentary activities. Unvaccinated MPs without exemptions are also faced with suspension of pay.

=== December ===
- 7 December – Three Latvian MPs are suspended from voting and have their pay suspended for not complying with the recent vaccination requirement rules.

== Deaths ==
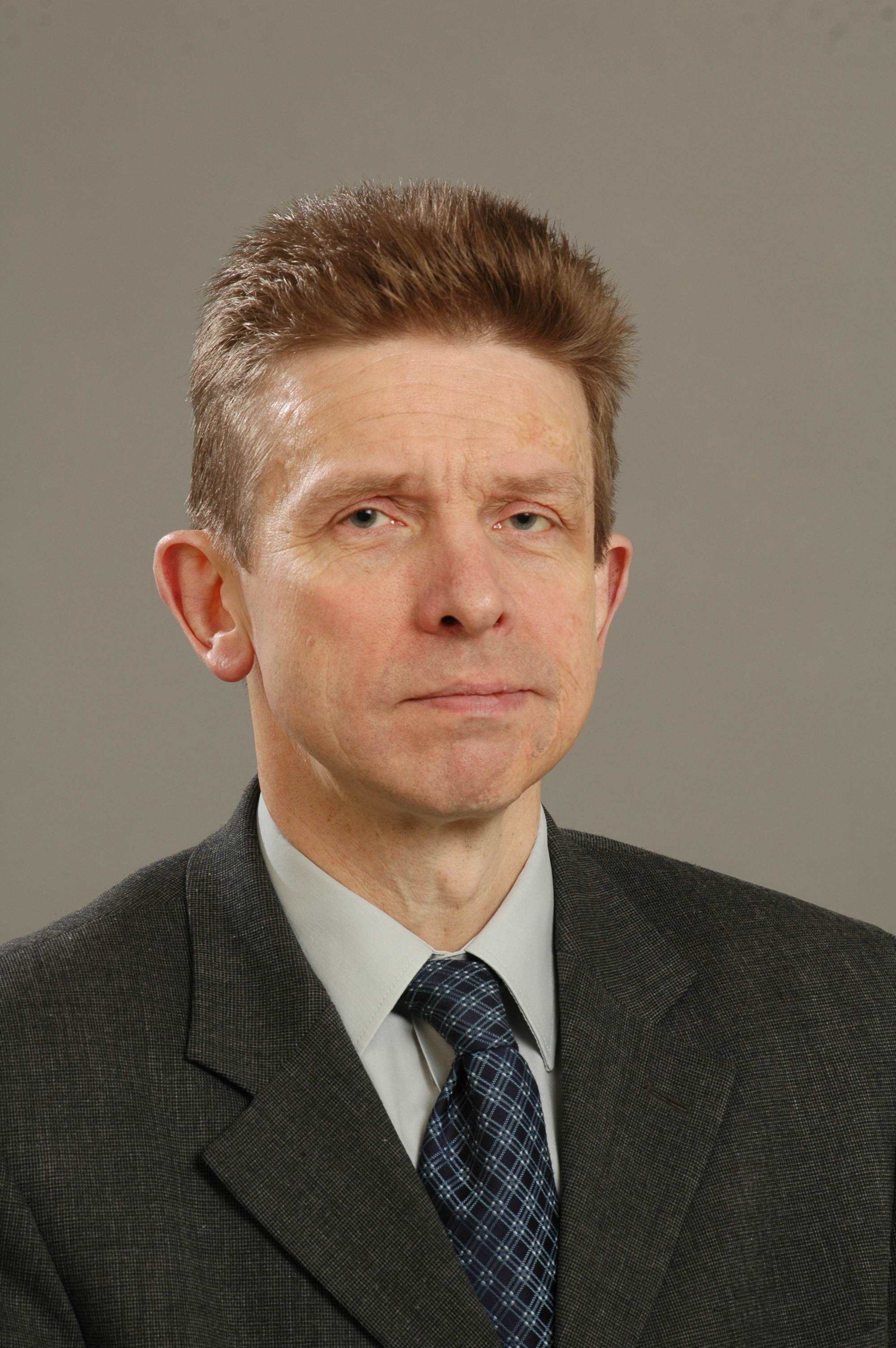
Māris Grīnblats

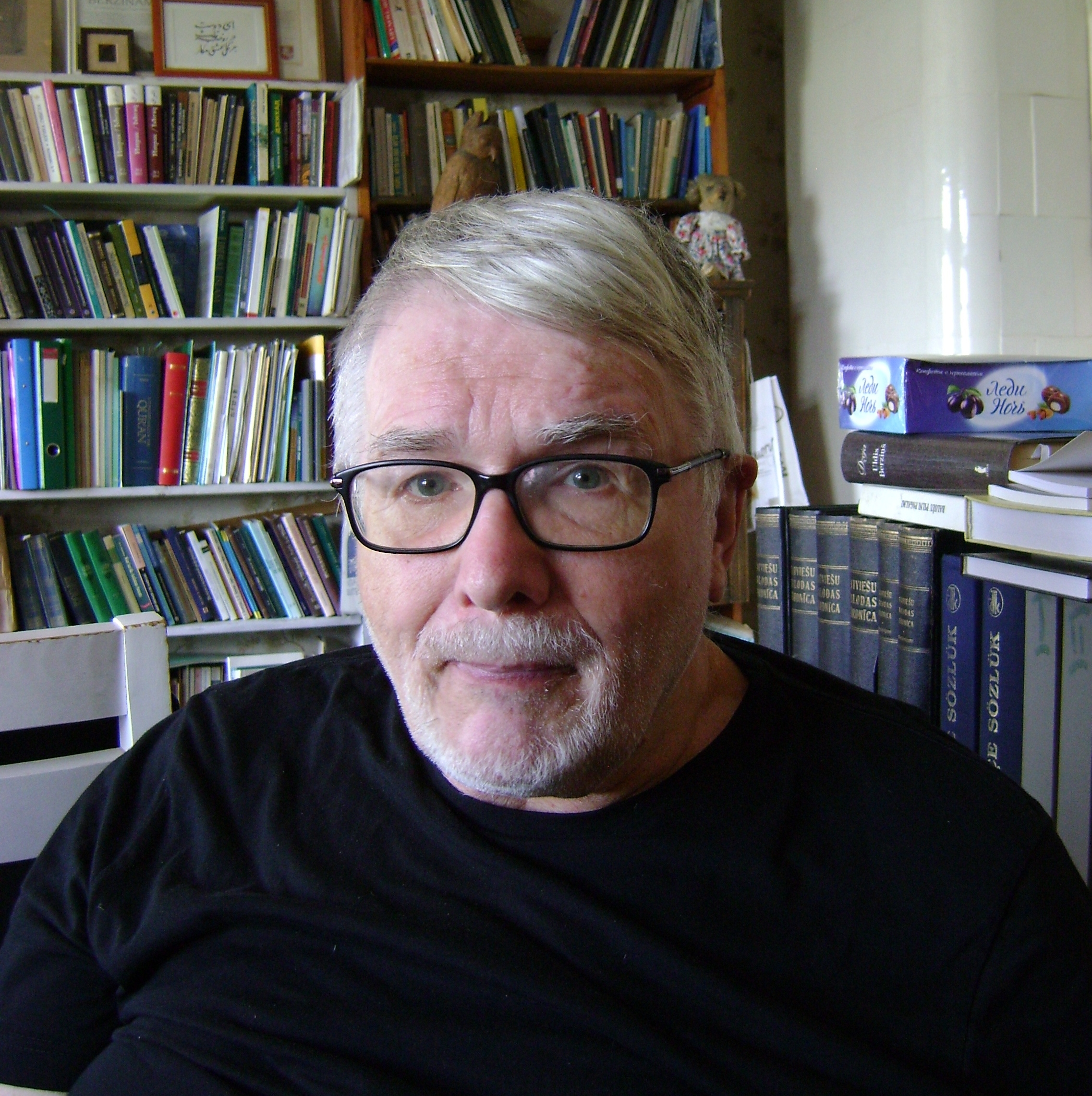
Uldis Bērziņš

- 27 February – Alvils Gulbis, basketball player (born 1936).
- 14 March – Māris Grīnblats, politician, minister of Education (born 1955).
- 24 March – Uldis Bērziņš, poet and translator (born 1944).
- 27 June – Jevgeņijs Drobots, politician and engineer (born 1946).
- 4 July – Matīss Kivlenieks, professional ice hockey goaltender (born 1996).
- July 18 – Valerij Zhuravliov, Soviet/Latvian chess master (born 1938).
- 14 September – Ansis Bērziņš, film producer and director (born 1940).
- 14 October – Ojārs Ēriks Kalniņš, politician and diplomat (born 1949).
- 5 November – Andris Kolbergs, writer (born 1938).
