= Lysir (rover) =

Legendary Danish general

- Religion: Pagan

Lyser or Liserus was an old and one-eyed rover mentioned in Gesta Danorum. He and Hading fought against Loker, the king of Curonians, only to be defeated.

== The text ==
Gesta Danorum, Book One
Hadding, thus bereft of his foster-mother, chanced to be made an ally in a solemn covenant to a rover, Lysir, by a certain man of great age that had lost an eye, who took pity on his loneliness. Now the ancients, when about to make a league, were wont to besprinkle their footsteps with blood of one another, so to ratify their pledge of friendship by reciprocal barter of blood. Lysir and Hadding, being bound thus in the strictest league, declared war against Loker, the tyrant of the Kurlanders. They were defeated; and the old man aforementioned took Hadding, as he fled on horseback, to his own house, and there refreshed him with a certain pleasant draught, telling him that he would find himself quite brisk and sound in body.
