= 2019 in Latvia =

- Decades: 1990s; 2000s; 2010s; 2020s
- See also: Other events of 2019; Timeline of Latvian history

Events of 2019 in Latvia.

== Incumbents ==
- President: Raimonds Vējonis (until July 8), Egils Levits (from July 8)
- Prime Minister: Māris Kučinskis (until January 23), Arturs Krišjānis Kariņš (from January 23)

== Events ==
=== November ===
- 12 November – As a result of the Iron March leak, it was discovered the Latvian national-conservative National Alliance politician and activist Raivis Zeltīts had posted on Iron March under the handle "Latvian_Integralist". Zeltīts acknowledged in a Facebook post that he had written using this handle, but Zeltīts said that he no longer held those views. Zeltīts remained in contact with Iron March administrator Benjamin Raymond as late as 2015.

== Deaths ==
- February 26 – Andrejs Žagars, actor (b. 1958)
- March 1 – Ivars Knēts, rector and professor (b. 1938)
- March 2 – Andra Neiburga, writer and translator (b. 1957)
- June 14 – Vaira Paegle, politician (b. 1942)
- June 20 – Anna Seile, scientist and politician (b. 1939)
- September 21 – Boriss Teterevs, philanthropist (b. 1953)
- September 23 – Jānis Šmits, politician and Lutheran pastor (b. 1968)
- October 26 – Mārtiņš Ķibilds, journalist (b. 1973)
- November 9 – Džemma Skulme, artist and modernist painter (b. 1925)
- December 1 – Mariss Jansons, conductor (b. 1943)
