= 2018 in Latvia =

- Decades: 1990s; 2000s; 2010s; 2020s
- See also: Other events of 2018; Timeline of Latvian history

Events in the year 2018 in Latvia.

== Incumbents ==
- President: Raimonds Vējonis
- Prime Minister: Māris Kučinskis
- Speaker: Ināra Mūrniece

== Events ==
- 6 October – The 2018 Latvian parliamentary election is held to elect All 100 members of the Saeima, Latvia's unicameral legislature.

== Deaths ==
- 24 January – Aleksandrs Kublinskis, composer (born 1936)
- 2 April – Morris Halle, Latvian-American linguist (born 1923)
