= 2011 in Latvia =

- Decades: 1990s; 2000s; 2010s; 2020s
- See also: Other events of 2011; Timeline of Latvian history

Events in the year 2011 in Latvia.

== Incumbents ==
- President - Valdis Zatlers (until 1 July), Andris Bērziņš (starting 1 July)
- Prime Minister - Valdis Dombrovskis

== Events ==
- 2 June: 2011 Latvian presidential election

== Arts and entertainment ==
In music: Latvia in the Eurovision Song Contest 2011.

== Sports ==
Football (soccer) competitions: Baltic League, Latvian Higher League, Latvian Football Cup. See also: List of Latvian football transfers winter 2010-2011.
