= 2020 in Latvia =

- Decades: 2000s; 2010s; 2020s
- See also: Other events of 2020; Timeline of Latvian history

Events of 2020 in Latvia.

== Incumbents ==
- President: Egils Levits
- Prime Minister: Arturs Krišjānis Kariņš

== Events ==
- 9 January – Latvia makes their debut at the European Men's Handball Championship, in the 2020 edition.

== Deaths ==
- February 1 – Leons Briedis, poet and novelist (b. 1949)
- March 31 – Aleksei Frolikov, ice hockey player (b. 1957)
- April 29 – Jānis Lūsis, track and field athlete (b. 1939)
- July 6 – Juris Kronbergs, poet and translator (b. 1946)
- September 20 – Pavels Rebenoks, lawyer and politician (b. 1980)
- October 2 – Tatjana Berga, archaeologist and numismatist (b. 1944)
- October 6 – Oļegs Karavajevs, football goalkeeper (b. 1961)
- November 16 – Laimonis Laizāns, football goalkeeper (b. 1945)
- November 27 – Dainis Liepiņš, cyclist (b. 1962)
