= Jevgeņijs Drobots =

Latvian politician (1946–2021)

Member of the Supreme Council of the Republic of Latvia
- In office 1990–1993

Personal details
- Born: 18 August 1946 Kirovsk, Russian SFSR, Soviet Union
- Died: 27 June 2021 (aged 74)
- Party: CPSU

Jevgeņijs Drobots (Russian: Евгений Павлович Дробот, Evgeny Pavlovich Drobot; 18 August 1946 – 27 June 2021) was a Latvian Russian politician and engineer. He worked as Deputy Chief Engineer of a chemical fiber plant in Daugavpils before serving on the Supreme Council of the Republic of Latvia from 1990 to 1993, elected from the 76th constituency of Daugavpils. He notably did not vote for the declaration On the Restoration of Independence of the Republic of Latvia. After his term in office, he joined the Latvian Russian Union and helped organize the Headquarters for the Protection of Russian Schools protests and Victory Day celebrations.
