= 2012 in Latvia =

- Decades: 1990s; 2000s; 2010s; 2020s
- See also: Other events of 2012; Timeline of Latvian history

Events in the year 2012 in Latvia.

== Incumbents ==
- President - Andris Bērziņš
- Prime Minister - Valdis Dombrovskis
- Speaker - Solvita Āboltiņa

== Events ==
- 2012 Latvian constitutional referendum

== Arts and entertainment ==
In music: Latvia in the Eurovision Song Contest 2012.

== Sports ==
Latvia at the 2012 Summer Olympics, Football (soccer) competitions: Baltic League, Latvian Higher League, Latvian Football Cup. See also: List of Latvian football transfers winter 2011-2012.
