= Lāčplēsis Day =

Memorial day in Latvia

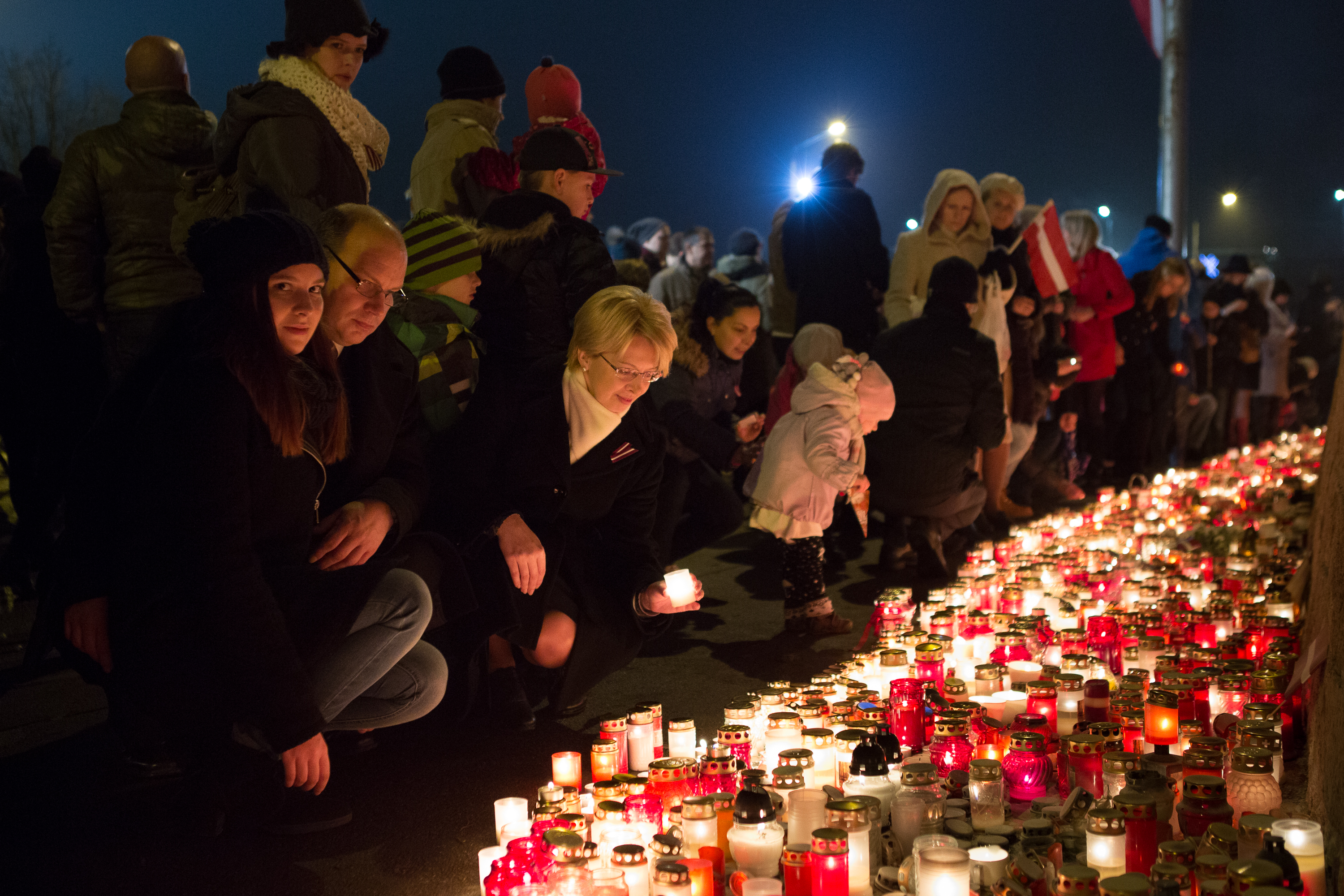
People commemorating the fallen by placing candles by the wall of Riga Castle

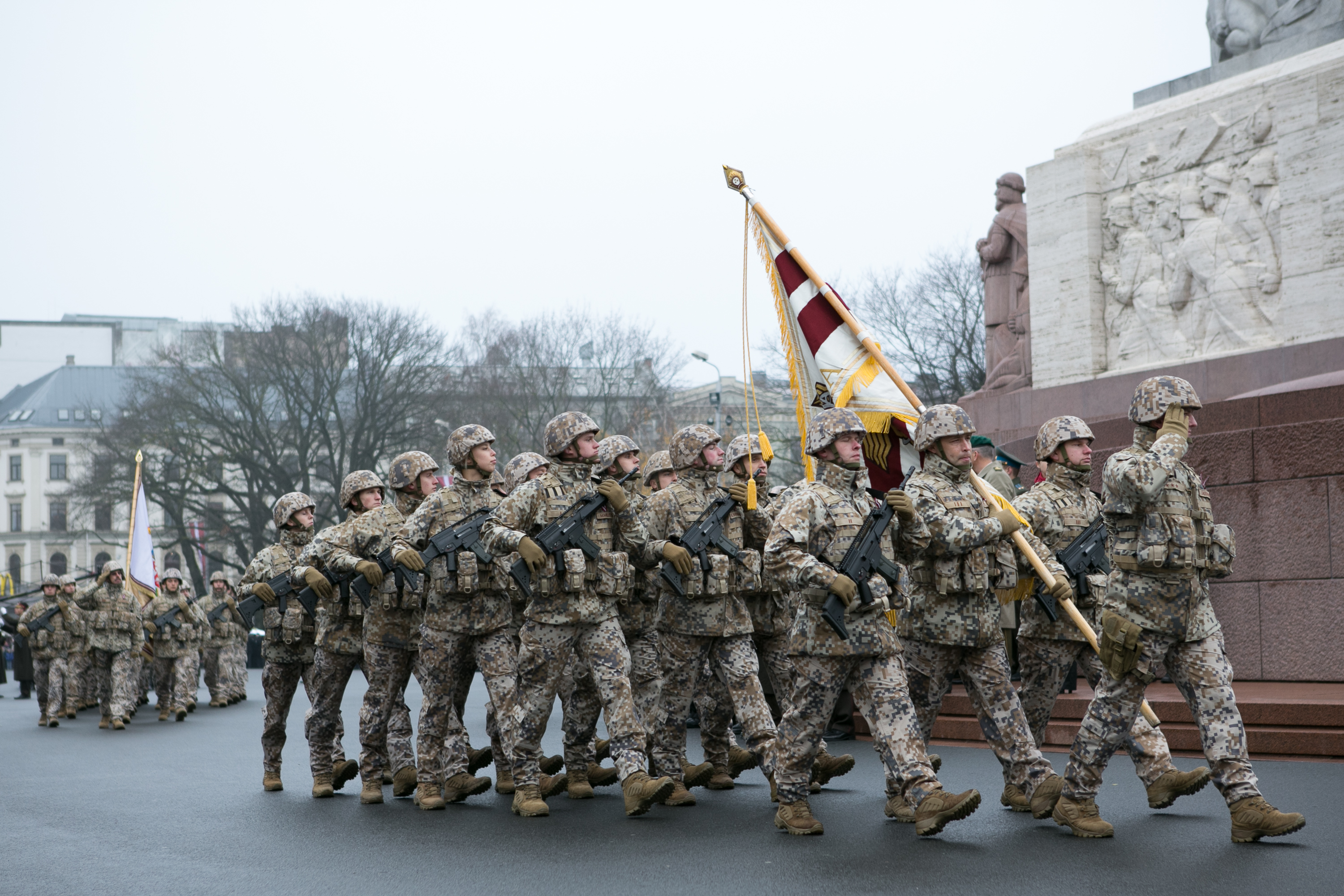
A Lāčplēsis Day military parade of the Latvian National Armed Forces and units for the Ministry of Internal Affairs at the foot of Freedom Monument

Lāčplēsis Day (Latvian: Lāčplēša diena) is a memorial day for soldiers who fought for the independence of Latvia. It is celebrated on November 11th, marking the decisive victory by the Latvian Army over the joint Russian-German West Russian Volunteer Army led by the warlord Pavel Bermondt-Avalov at the 1919 Battle of Riga during the Latvian War of Independence, thus safeguarding the independence of the nascent nation. It initially was a day of honoring the 743 soldiers that fell in the Battle of Riga.

A popular commemorative symbol, introduced by the LNT television channel in 2007 and supported by the Latvian Ministry of Defence, is a victory sign-shaped Latvian flag ribbon worn on the left chest. It is often worn throughout November.

== Background ==
The Republic of Latvia was proclaimed on November 18, 1918, by the People's Council of Latvia at the city of Riga. The territory of Latvia had been overrun by the Imperial German Army. After the end of World War I, the Imperial German Army stationed in Latvia was ordered by Allied forces to work with the Latvian Army to defend against the Bolshevik invasion of December 1918. The Imperial German Army soon turned against the Latvians in April 1919, hoping to make Latvia subject to Germany. The Estonian Army including the North Latvian Brigade defeated the Imperial German forces in the Battle of Cēsis in June 1919. Former soldiers of the German Empire and Russian Empire regrouped and reinvaded Latvia in the fall of 1919. The outnumbered Latvian Army fought valiantly and was victorious on November 11, 1919. The Latvian–Soviet Peace Treaty was signed on August 11, 1920, finalizing the Latvian success in their war of independence.

== History ==
=== In the Republic of Latvia (1918–1940) ===
After the West Russian Volunteer Army was pushed out of Riga, Latvian writer Kārlis Skalbe compared the fighting spirit of the Latvian Armed Forces against the German/Russian volunteer army to the "spirit of Lāčplēsis".The Constitutional Assembly of Latvia created the Order of Lāčplēsis soon after to commemorate instrumental figures in the Latvian victory over the invaders. On November 11, 1920, the first solemn awarding ceremony of the Lāčplēsis War Orders took place on the Esplanade Park in Riga, in which the Chairman of the Constitutional Assembly Jānis Čakste presented orders to the first 288 Knights of the Order. These 288 Knights were mainly soldiers and instructors who fought bravely against the invading Germans and Russians to secure independence.

On November 1, 1928, the Order of Lāčplēsis ceased to be awarded, and Lāčplēsis Day became a massive army holiday, celebrated by army garrisons through parades, feasts, concerts, and solemn events. The recipients of the war order and those injured or disabled in combat were especially honored during the Lāčplēsis Day festivities. These annual parades on the 11th of November went on for 20 years before the Soviet Union invaded and occupied Latvia.

=== In the Latvian SSR (1940–1991) ===
After Soviet occupation of Latvia in 1940, the celebration of Lāčplēsis Day was strictly prohibited. During the third awakening of Latvia, the Latvian Soviet Socialist Republic (LSSR) resumed the celebration of Lāčplēsis Day. On November 10, 1989, the Supreme Soviet of the LSSR designated Lāčplēsis Day as a day of remembrance. Lāčplēsis Day became a day of commemoration for the soldiers who gave their lives during the Latvian War of Independence. A popular Lāčplēsis Day tradition since 1988 has been placing candles by the wall of Riga Castle. Similar candle-lighting ceremonies also take place in other cities, villages and military cemeteries across the country.

=== In the Republic of Latvia (1991–present) ===
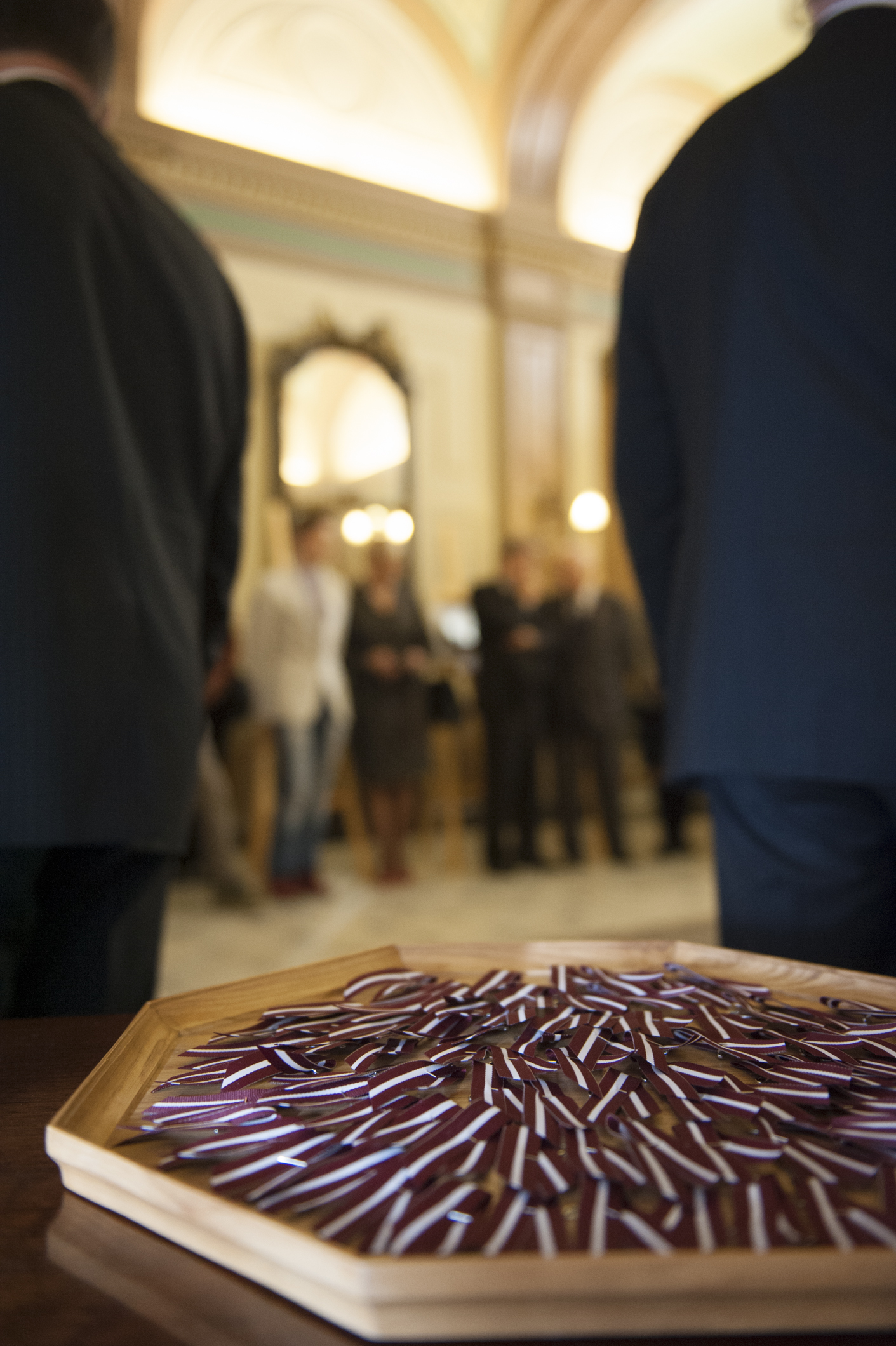
A commemorative 'V' shaped Latvian flag ribbon worn on the day

In 2018, a proposal by Unity and National Alliance to make Lāčplēsis Day a national holiday failed. Lāčplēsis Day now honors all fallen Latvian freedom fighters, not just the Knights of the Lāčplēsis War Order. November has become a symbolic month of Latvian reflection on the founding of their nation. Latvian officials frequently mention Lāčplēsis Day to rally Latvians in various modern conflicts.

Given the COVID-19 pandemic ongoing in 2021, Latvian President Egils Levits tweeted "Let's remember our own Lāčplēsis heroes, Latvian Army soldiers who sacrificed their lives for their homeland. Today we must find the strength of Lāčplēsis to fight for the health of the people, in order to resist delusions." Levits encouraged his citizens to make wise and sacrificial decisions regarding the global pandemic, drawing upon the strength of the Knights of Lāčplēsis.

== See also ==
- Lāčplēsis
- Order of Lāčplēsis
- Proclamation Day of the Republic of Latvia
