= Ivars Knēts =

Latvian professor and rector (1938–2019)

- Born: September 17, 1938; Riga, Latvia
- Died: March 1, 2019 (aged 80); Riga, Latvia
- Education: Riga Polytechnic Institute
- Occupation: Engineer

Ivars Knēts (September 17, 1938, Riga, Latvia – March 1, 2019) was a rector and professor at Riga Technical University, as the Director of the Institute of Biomaterials and Biomechanics.
