= Žermēna Heine-Vāgnere =

Soviet and Latvian operatic soprano

- Born: Žermēna Heine; June 23, 1923; Riga, Latvia
- Died: December 7, 2017 (aged 94) Riga, Latvia
- Genres: opera
- Occupation: Opera singer
- Instrument: soprano

Žermēna Heine-Vāgnere (Note: Latvian: Žermēna Heine-Vāgnere; Russian: Жермена Леопольдовна Гейне-Вагнер, romanized: Zhermena Leopoldovna Geyne-Vagner) (née Heine, 23 June 1923 – 7 December 2017) was a Soviet and Latvian operatic soprano.

She was born on 23 June 1923 in Riga, to singer Erna Heine. An uncle, Alberts Verners, was a leading baritone for the Latvian National Opera in the 1930s for which Heine-Vāgnere also performed. She studied under singers Hertas Lūses and Marijas Bolotovas.

Heine-Vāgnere began her career in 1950 and appeared in Macbeth as Lady Macbeth, Cavalleria rusticana as Santuzza, Otello as Desdemona, Eugene Onegin as Tatyana, Der Ring des Nibelungen as Brünnhilde and Lohengrin as Ortrud. Other performances included roles in Alfrēds Kalniņš's Banuta, Salome, and Turandot. She retired in November 1975, having sung in 39 distinct roles.

Heine-Vāgnere was named a People's Artist of the USSR in 1969 and also received the Order of the Three Stars, third class. She was married to architect Nikolajs Vāgners and died on 7 December 2017, aged 94.
