= Loker (Curonian king) =

Legendary king of the Curonians

King of the Curonians
- Religion: Pagan

Loker or Lokero was a legendary Curonian king mentioned in Gesta Danorum. Exiled Danish prince, Hading and an old rover, Lysir attacked his realm, but were defeated.

== The text ==
Gesta Danorum, Book One
Lysir and Hadding, being bound thus in the strictest league, declared war against Loker, the tyrant of the Kurlanders. They were defeated; and the old man aforementioned took Hadding, as he fled on horseback, to his own house, and there refreshed him with a certain pleasant draught, telling him that he would find himself quite brisk and sound in body.
