= Vladlens Dozorcevs =

Russian-Latvian politician (1939–2026)

- Владлен Дозорцев
- Dozorcevs in 2011

Member of the Supreme Council of Latvia
- In office 1990–1993

Member of the Saeima
- In office 1995–1998

Personal details
- Born: 3 July 1939 Roslavl, Smolensk Oblast, Russian SFSR, Soviet Union
- Died: 19 October 2026 (aged 87) Latvia
- Party: TSP
- Education: University of Latvia

Vladlens Dozorcevs (Russian: Владлен Леонидович Дозорцев, romanized: Vladlen Leonidovich Dozortsev; (Note: In this name that follows East Slavic naming customs, the patronymic is Leonidovich and the family name is Dozortsev.) 3 July 1939 – 19 October 2026) was a Russian-Latvian politician. A member of the National Harmony Party, he served in the Supreme Council of Latvia from 1990 to 1993 and in the Saeima from 1995 to 1998.

Dozorcevs died in Latvia on 19 October 2026, at the age of 87.
