= Kārlis Bardelis =

- Born: February 12, 1985; Jūrmala, Latvian SSR, Soviet Union (now Latvia)
- Died: November 17, 2025 (aged 40); Latvia
- Citizenship: Latvia
- Occupations: Adventurer; World traveler
- Years active: 2011–2025
- Spouse: Elizabete Ozola (m. 2025)

Kārlis Bardelis (February 12, 1985 – November 17, 2025) was a Latvian adventurer and world traveler. He gained wide recognition for his human-powered expeditions – particularly rowing across oceans – and was a six-time Guinness World Records holder. Bardelis led the project Bored of Borders, during which, over nine years, he circumnavigated the globe using only his own physical strength (without motors or sails).

== Life ==
Kārlis Bardelis was born on February 12, 1985, in Jūrmala, Soviet Union (now Latvia). He attended Jūrmala State Gymnasium No. 1 (graduating in 2003), then earned a bachelor's degree in European economics and business at Riga Stradiņš University (2007) and a master's degree in environmental resource management at the University of Latvia (2011). As a child, Bardelis played basketball and dreamed of becoming a professional athlete. After completing his education, he worked in the waste-management industry, but at the age of 27, he decided to leave his job to devote himself fully to travel and adventure. He described himself as a "full-time traveler" (a professional adventurer) whose work was not tied to a regular salary.

=== Career and expeditions ===
Bardeli's travels began with shorter expeditions and extreme sporting attempts in Europe. As early as 2005 and 2007, he reached the highest peaks in Europe, Mount Elbrus and Mont Blanc. In 2013, he launched the project Bored of Borders – in 60 days, using specialized skates, he covered a 6,247 km route from the North Cape to Gibraltar, crossing 11 countries. In February 2014, together with three other cyclists, he traveled in the winter cold from Riga, Latvia, to Sochi, Russia, for the 2014 Winter Olympics.

Bardeli's largest and most notable expeditions involved crossing oceans and circumnavigating the world without external assistance. On May 4, 2016, together with fellow traveler Gints Barkovskis, he set out across the Atlantic Ocean from Namibia to Brazil. After 142 days, the pair successfully reached the coast of South America, becoming the first two-person crew to row across the Atlantic Ocean. During the voyage, both men faced serious health problems (vitamin deficiencies, skin inflammations), and Barkovskis broke his ribs, yet neither wished to abandon the journey, and the expedition concluded successfully.

After crossing the Atlantic, Bardelis continued his journey through South America, and in 2018 began a new stage. From Brazil, with Gints Barkovskis, he traveled through South America to Lima, Peru, completing the roughly 5,400 km stretch in 102 days. Afterward, in June 2018, Bardelis set out alone by rowboat to cross the Pacific Ocean. He covered a distance of about 26,000 km from South America to Malaysia, spending a total of 715 days at sea; with this feat, he became the first person in the world to row across the Pacific Ocean from South America to Asia. During this sea expedition, he had to overcome several stormy stretches and needed to stop at islands along the way, but ultimately Bardelis became known worldwide as the first ocean rower to complete this route.

Because of the COVID-19 pandemic, Bardelis had to return to Latvia for a couple of years, but in 2021 he resumed the final stage of his expedition. In January 2022, he rowed from Malaysia to Sri Lanka, where he was joined by fellow traveler Dmitry Kiefer. Together they continued to the Maldives, after which Bardelis carried on alone. In June 2022, he became the first person to row across the Indian Ocean from Asia to Africa, although winds and currents unexpectedly carried him to the coast of Somalia. Continuing his journey by bicycle, he traveled from Kenya through Tanzania, Zambia, Botswana, and Namibia to complete his long journey: on April 4, 2024, he officially finished his circumnavigation across the globe, returning to his starting point in Namibia. Over the course of the entire 7-year, 11-month journey, he had rowed approximately 46,326 km and cycled approximately 11,972 km.

=== Achievements and recognition ===
Kārlis Bardelis set several impressive personal records and gained international recognition. He was a six-time Guinness World Records holder. Three of his records involve unrepeatable routes: together with Gints Barkovskis, he was the first to row across the Atlantic Ocean as a two-person team; he was the first to row across the Indian Ocean from Asia to Africa. All of these achievements are recorded in the Guinness Book of World Records. In 2024, upon completing his 7.5-year journey around the globe, Bardelis set several additional records – in total, six Guinness records were registered for this project, three of which are considered unbeatable.

In Latvia and abroad, Bardelis received recognition not only for his athletic achievements but also for his contributions to society. He actively participated in various charity and volunteer projects. For example, in 2022 he organized the fundraising campaign "Row for a Home" (Airē māju) to raise funds for the construction of the first hospice house in Latvia. That same year, he was invited to the European Parliament's Citizens' Prize ceremony, "Inspiring Talks," where, as one of the storytellers, he shared his experience of volunteer work and support for the "Hospice LV" project. In spring 2025, the documentary film Beyond the Deep (Aizsniegt dzelmi) was released, dedicated to Bardeli's Pacific Ocean expedition, which received wide media attention in Latvia.

=== Illness and death ===
In February 2025, media reports revealed that Bardelis had suffered a stroke and had been diagnosed with a brain tumor. He died from the tumor on November 17, 2025.

== Personal life ==
During his 2018 expedition, his girlfriend Linda Zuze became his travel companion, joining him for a long stretch of the journey toward Peru. In his later years, his partner was Elizabete Ozola, described as Bardeli's girlfriend and supporter; in the summer of 2025, Kārlis married Elizabete.
