= Dzintars Zilgalvis =

Latvian visual artist and curator

- Born: 20 April 1956 (age 70); Riga
- Education: Maastricht University
- Known for: Painting, cultural management, site-specific installation, curatorial practice
- Awards: Baltais zvirbulis (2007)

Dzintars Zilgalvis (born 20 April 1956) is a Latvian visual artist, curator, and cultural organiser based in Riga. He is recognized for his contributions to the development of Latvia's independent contemporary art infrastructure, notably as the founder of the NOASS cultural platform and the Latvian Naive Art Museum. His work is held in the permanent collection of the Latvian National Museum of Art.

== Early life and education ==
Zilgalvis was born in Riga. In 1973, he enrolled at the Jānis Rozentāls Art High School in Riga, specialising in visual arts. From 1975 to 1976, he trained in the projectionist department of the Riga 3rd Vocational Technical School, subsequently working as a designer for the Latvian National Opera and Ballet and the A. Popov Riga Radio Factory. In 2005, he completed professional studies in cultural management at Maastricht University in the Netherlands.

== Artistic practice ==
Zilgalvis has been a member of the Latvian Artists' Union (LMS) since 1988. His early career was defined by the late-Soviet Latvian avant-garde, including participation in the international group exhibition Rīga – Latvian Avant-garde (1988) in West Berlin. His 1990 oil painting Last Balcony. Dedication to the Painter's Section of the Artists' Union (Pēdējais balkons. Veltījums Mākslinieku savienības Gleznotāju sekcijai) is featured in the Latvian National Museum of Art's educational series Vienas gleznas stāsts (Story of a Painting).

In his contemporary practice, Zilgalvis focuses on large-scale, site-specific installations. Notable works include the 2015 environmental installation Stories Told by Water (Daugavas stāsti), which utilised digital sensors to map river movement, and the 2017 permanent cast-glass installation With a Fervor for Freedom (Ar degsmi par brīvu Latviju), created in collaboration with Krišs Zilgalvis for the Maria Chapel of Riga Cathedral to commemorate the 1991 Latvian Barricades.

== Institutional and curatorial work ==
Zilgalvis is the founder and director of the NOASS cultural platform, established in 1998. Based on floating structures on the Daugava River in Riga, NOASS functions as a hub for contemporary art, video festivals, and international artist-in-residence exchanges. In 2002, he initiated the Latvian Video Art Archive, the country's first national database systematically documenting Latvian video art history from the late 1980s to the present. Alongside Aivars Leitis, Zilgalvis co-founded the Latvian Naive Art Museum in 2005, serving as its director to document and preserve outsider art traditions.

== Professional expertise and jury service ==
Zilgalvis frequently serves as a cultural expert and jury member for international and national contemporary art and film initiatives. Since 2000, he has directed the international Waterpieces festival, a long-standing curatorial project through which he has exchanged video art programs with prestigious institutions such as the Guggenheim Foundation, the Japan Media Arts Festival, and CologneOFF. His extensive curatorial background informs his work as an international juror, including service for the International Short Film Festival Oberhausen, where he has provided expertise on interdisciplinary video art and moving image installations.

== Selected exhibitions ==
- 2023–2025: Mūra nojaukšana. Latvijas mākslā 1985–1991, Latvian National Museum of Art (LNMM)
- 2023: ARCHIVUM, Lipani Gallery, Fordham University, New York
- 2018: Where Does Poetry Come From?, NOASS, Riga
- 2017: Latvijas māksla 1985–2000, LNMM permanent exhibition
- 2017: With a Fervour for a Free Latvia (stained glass), Riga Cathedral, Riga
- 2015: Stories Told by Water, Riga
- 2014: Fest Naive Rīga, Latvian Naive Art Museum (NOASS), Riga
- 2011: European Culture Canon, Riga City Council, Riga
- 2010: Glezniecība Latvijā 1950.–1990., Rīgas mākslas telpa
- 2009: From de facto to the iure, Latvian National Museum of Art, Riga
- 2008: No de facto līdz de jure, LNMM
- 2004: The Portrait of Blouse, Vagnera Hall, Riga
- 2001: Postmodernism, Arsenāls Exhibition Hall, Riga
- 1996: Wallpaper Roses for The Beloved Girl, Arsenāls Exhibition Hall, Riga
- 1995: Piemineklis (Monument), 3rd Annual Soros Center for Contemporary Arts, Riga
- 1993: Peintures Lettones du Xxeme Siecle, traveling exhibition (Paris, Bordeaux, Strasbourg)
- 1990: Baltijas republiku Viļņas glezniecības triennāle, Vilnius, Lithuania
- 1990: Latvian Painting, Arsenāls Exhibition Hall, Riga
- 1988: Rīga – Latvian Avant-garde, West Berlin

== Awards and recognition ==
- 2007: Baltais zvirbulis (White Sparrow) award, presented by the Riga City Council in recognition of his contributions to the development of Riga's creative infrastructure.

== Collections ==
- Latvian National Museum of Art (Riga, Latvia) – His work was featured in the museum's major permanent exhibition, Latvian Art. 19th–20th Century, inaugurated in 2016.
- Latvian National History Museum (Riga, Latvia)
- Latvian Artists' Union Museum (Riga, Latvia)

== Exhibition catalogues ==
- Stories Told by Water / Daugavas stāsti (2018)
- Today and Tomorrow / Archivium (2023)
- Kalāčojums (2025) — Co-authored catalogue tracking exhibitions held at the Eduards Veidenbaums Museum.
