= Rasma Garne =

Latvian stage actress (1941–2024)

- Born: 26 March 1941
- Died: 9 October 2024 (aged 83); Riga, Latvia
- Occupation: Actress
- Awards: Order of the Three Stars (2018)

Rasma Garne (26 March 1941 – 9 October 2024) was a Latvian stage and film actress. She has performed roles in film including Mēs esam četri (1972), Ja nebūtu šī skuķa (1980), Lietus blūzs (1982), Zītaru dzimta (1989), and Depresija (1991).

Garne was awarded the Order of the Three Stars on 17 November 2018.

Garne was born on 26 March 1941, and died in Riga, Latvia on 9 October 2024, at the age of 83.
