= 2015 in Latvia =

- Decades: 1990s; 2000s; 2010s; 2020s
- See also: Other events of 2015; Timeline of Latvian history

Events in the year 2015 in Latvia.

== State officials ==
Position	Person	Remarks
President of Latvia	Andris Bērziņš (till July 7)	
President of Latvia	Raimonds Vējonis (from July 8)	
Prime Minister of Latvia	Laimdota Straujuma	Second Straujuma cabinet
Speaker of the Saeima	Ināra Mūrniece	

== Events ==
=== January ===
- January 1:
  - Latvia joined the European Union presidency, replacing Italy;
  - electricity market opening.
- January 16 — Latvia to the European Commission was transfer 1.2 billion euros from the 2009 loan.

=== May ===
- May 24 — Aminata Savadogo represents Latvia in the final of the Eurovision Song Contest 2015, finishing 6th.

=== June ===
- June 3 — 2015 Latvian presidential election: Raimonds Vējonis of the Green Party is elected President.

=== July ===
- July 1 — Luxembourg joined the European Union presidency, replacing Latvia;
- July 8 — Raimonds Vējonis replaced Andris Bērziņš in post of President of Latvia.

=== September ===
- In the autumn of 2015 was the largest grain harvest in Latvian history.

=== October ===
- October 26 — In Garkalne Municipality on A2 road truck knocked down a children training team of Riga Cycling school, suffered an accident 13 people.

=== December ===
- December 1 — service was transferred to the restored building of the Latvian National Museum of Art.
- December 7 — Prime minister Laimdota Straujuma announced her resignation.

== Deaths ==
- February 7 — Baiba Caune, cyclist (b. 1945)
- April 5 — Pāvels Kovaļovs, triple jumper (b. 1990)
- September 17 - Ingrīda Andriņa, stage and film actress (b. 1944)
- September 23 — Kārlis Zariņš, opera singer (b. 1930)
