= 2022 in Latvia =

- Decades: 2000s; 2010s; 2020s
- See also: Other events of 2022; Timeline of Latvian history

Events in the year 2022 in Latvia.

== Incumbents ==
- President: Egils Levits
- Prime Minister: Arturs Krišjānis Kariņš

== Events ==
Ongoing — COVID-19 pandemic in Latvia

- 24 February – Latvia suspends issuing visas to Russian citizens.
- 28 February – Latvia allows volunteers to participate in the Russo-Ukrainian war.
- 4 April – France, Germany and Latvia expel Russian diplomats in response to war crimes in the 2022 Russian invasion of Ukraine, specifically the Bucha massacre.
- 5 April – Latvia closes the Russian consulates in Daugavpils and Liepāja.
- 13 April – Presidents Andrzej Duda of Poland, Gitanas Nausėda of Lithuania, Egils Levits of Latvia, and Alar Karis of Estonia arrive in Kyiv and meet with Ukrainian president Volodymyr Zelenskyy.
- 3 June – Latvia confirms its first case of monkeypox.
- 6 June – Latvia bans all Russia-based TV media outlets that threaten "the territorial integrity and independence of another country", referring to the Russo-Ukrainian War. The measure will last until Russia de-occupies Crimea and ends its warfare against Ukraine.
- 6 July – Latvia plans to reintroduce conscription, which had been abolished in 2006, as a result of the Russian invasion of Ukraine. The final decision will be determined by the country's parliament, the Saeima.
- 8 July – Killnet, a Russian hacker group, launches the largest cyberattack in the history of Latvia, targeting the country's public broadcaster. The broadcaster says that the attack was repelled.
- 30 July – Russia's Gazprom suspends gas supplies to Latvia after accusing it of "violating conditions of purchase". The Latvian government says the suspension of gas from Russia is not expected to have a major impact on the economy.
- 11 August –
  - The Latvian Parliament declares Russia a state sponsor of terrorism over its invasion of Ukraine.
  - Estonia and Latvia formally withdraw from the Cooperation between China and Central and Eastern European Countries group amid tensions with China over its human rights record and its support of Russia's war on Ukraine.
- 4 September – A private Cessna 551 crashes into the Baltic Sea, off the coast of Latvia.
- 8 September – Poland and the Baltic states announce a ban on Russian tourists entering their countries beginning on September 19.
- 27 September – Latvia announces a state of emergency over the influx of Russian citizens fleeing mobilization. Special measures are taken in the border regions of the country and at all ports of entry.
- 1 October – 2022 Latvian parliamentary election: Latvians elect members of the Saeima.
- 25 November - According to the decision of the Supreme Court, the chairman of the Jūrmala City Council, Gatis Truksnis, lost his position.

== Sport ==
Basketball

- 2021–22 European North Basketball League
- 2021–22 Latvian–Estonian Basketball League

Other sports

- 2021–22 Latvian Hockey League season
- Latvia at the 2022 Winter Olympics
- Latvia at the 2022 Winter Paralympics

== Deaths ==
- 21 January – Arnis Līcītis, actor (born 1946).
- 22 January – Andrew Ezergailis, historian (born 1930).
- 6 February – Ilmārs Verpakovskis, footballer (born 1958).
- 11 February – Mārtiņš Rītiņš, chef (born 1949).
- 15 February – Edgars Račevskis, conductor (born 1936).
- 17 February – Romāns Apsītis, jurist and politician (born 1939).
- 16 March – Dzintars Jaundžeikars, politician (born 1956).
- 19 March – Roberts Ķīlis, politician (born 1968).
- 29 March – Zigmunds Skujiņš, writer (born 1926).
