= Raimonds Staprans =

Latvian-born American artist (1926–2026)

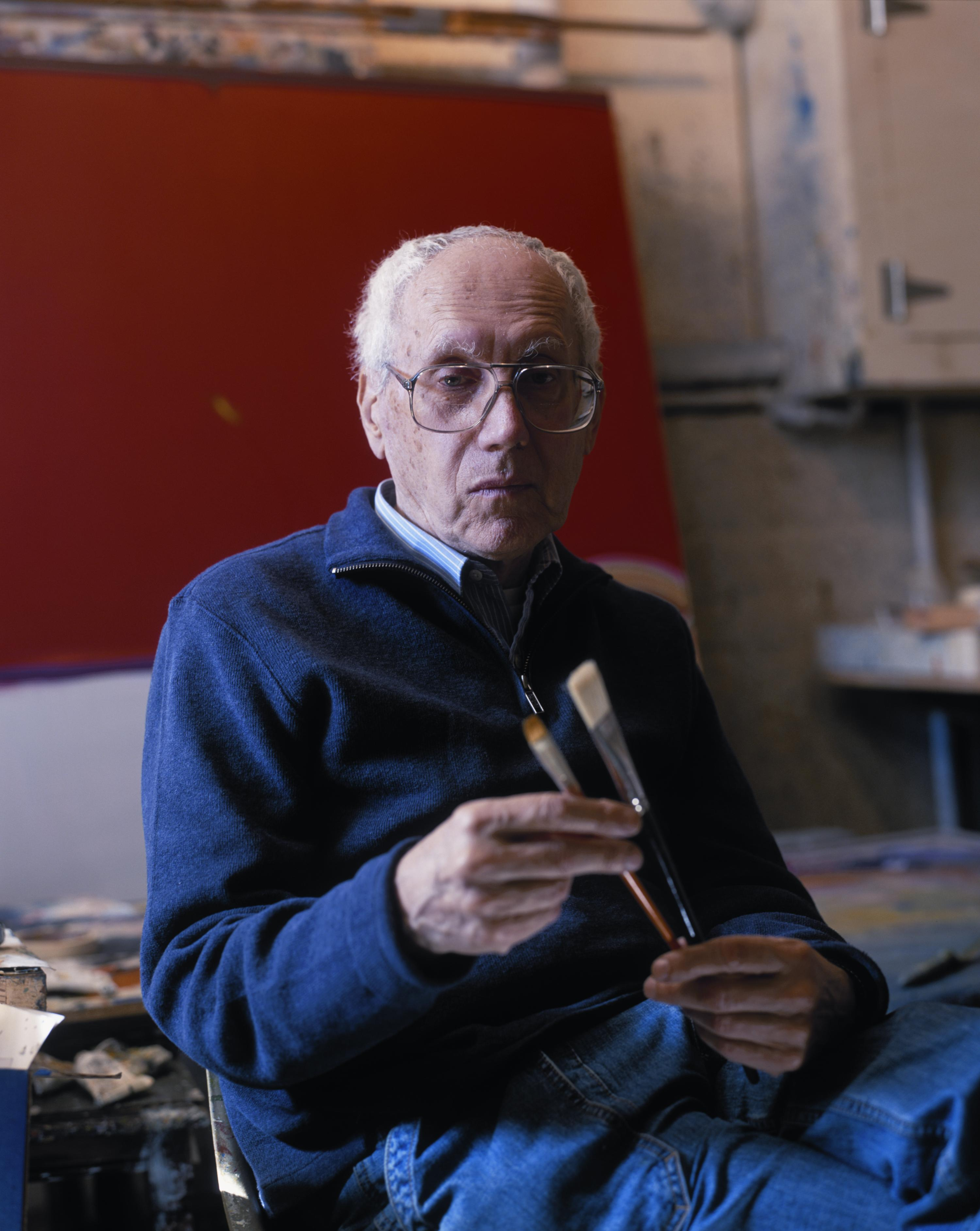
- Staprans in 2008
- Born: 13 October 1926; Riga, Latvia
- Died: 29 January 2026 (aged 99)
- Education: University of Washington (BA), University of California, Berkeley (MFA)
- Occupations: Painter, playwright
- Spouse: Ilona Staprans
- Children: 2

Raimonds Staprans (Latvian: Raimonds Staprāns; 13 October 1926 – 29 January 2026) was a Latvian-born American visual artist and playwright. He is widely known for his still-life and landscape paintings and for his plays set in Latvia.

== Early life and education ==
Staprans was born in Riga, Latvia, on 13 October 1926. His father was Dr. Teodores Staprans, a surgeon. After living in occupied Latvia and in a displaced persons camp during World War II, Staprans immigrated to the United States with his family in 1947.

Staprans studied art at the University of Washington under Alexander Archipenko and Mark Tobey, where he graduated with a bachelor's degree in 1952. He then moved to the San Francisco Bay Area to begin graduate studies at the University of California, Berkeley. Staprans studied with Hans Hofmann, Karl Kasten, Erie Loran, and Worth Ryder, among others. He graduated with a Masters of Fine Arts in 1954.

== Career ==
He began exhibiting his art in the Maxwell Galleries in San Francisco. He exhibited at the Hackett | Mill Gallery in San Francisco and at the Peter Mendenhall Gallery in Los Angeles.

Staprans' still life and landscape paintings are notable for the artist's sensitive response to light and color. A review of his work exhibited in Los Angeles compared the "tasteful seriousness" of his paintings to that of Cézanne. Staprans was said to examine the "architecture" of everyday objects in his art using explosive color and flattened compositions, creating a "tension between representation and abstraction that plays with viewers' expectations."

Staprans was also a playwright. Most of his plays are set in Latvia during the 20th century. His play "The Freezing" was produced in 1979 by the San Francisco Little Theater and the Latvian National Theater in 1980. His 1989 play, "Four Days in June", depicted the Soviet occupation of Latvia in 1940. It was performed in Riga to more than 100 sold-out audiences, and later won first prize in the Baltic Theatre Festival. "Four Days in June" is regarded as having played an integral part in the pro-democracy movement in Latvia during the momentous changes following the end of the Soviet Union.

In 2003, Staprans was awarded Latvia's highest civilian honor, the Order of the Three Stars, the Latvian equivalent of the United States Presidential Medal of Freedom.

An extensive interview with Staprans was conducted by the Archives of American Art, Smithsonian Institution, by Paul Karlstrom in 1997. Karlstrom later published a fully illustrated book entitled "Raimonds Staprans: Art of Tranquility and Turbulence".

A career retrospective of his art opened at the Pasadena Museum of California Art in March 2006 and was shown at the Hackett-Freedman Gallery before it traveled to Riga, Latvia, where it was exhibited in the Latvian National Museum of Art later that year. A 60-year retrospective exhibit entitled "Full Spectrum: Paintings by Raimonds Staprans" opened in June 2017 at the Crocker Art Museum in Sacramento, California, and then moved to the San Jose Museum of Art in San Jose, California, in February 2018.

== Death and legacy ==
Staprans later lived in San Francisco, California, with his wife, scientist Ilona Staprans. He had two daughters.

Staprans died on 29 January 2026, at the age of 99.

Public collections holding Staprans' work include the Fine Arts Museums of San Francisco, the Los Angeles County Museum of Art, the San Jose Museum of Art, and the Portland Art Museum.

== Exhibitions ==
- 1955 Maxwell Galleries, San Francisco, California
- 1993 Galerie Redmann, Berlin, Germany
- 1994 Marburg Art Center, Marburg, Germany; Galerie Redmann, Berlin; Maxwell Galleries, San Francisco, California
- 1996 Maxwell Galleries, San Francisco; Mendenhall Gallery, Pasadena, California
- 1997 Kunstmesse, Cologne, Germany; Galerie Redmann, Berlin, Germany; Mendenhall Gallery, Pasadena, California
- 1998 Maxwell Galleries, San Francisco, California
- 1999 Mendenhall Gallery, Beverly Hills, California
- 2001 Hackett-Freedman Gallery, San Francisco, California
- 2003–2004 Hackett-Freedman Gallery, San Francisco, California
- 2006 State Museum of Art, Riga, Latvia; Hackett-Freedman Gallery, San Francisco, California; Pasadena Museum of California Art, Pasadena, California;
- 2008 Peter Mendenhall Gallery, Los Angeles, California
- March 2009 Hackett-Freedman Gallery, San Francisco, California
- April 2011 Hackett Mill Gallery, San Francisco, California
- April 2013 Peter Mendenhall Gallery, Los Angeles, California
- 2016 Latvian National Museum of Art, Riga, Latvia
- June–October 2017 Crocker Art Museum, Sacramento, California
- February–May 2018 San Jose Museum of Art, San Jose, California
