= 2013 in Latvia =

- Decades: 1990s; 2000s; 2010s; 2020s
- See also: Other events of 2013; Timeline of Latvian history

The following lists events that happened during 2013 in Latvia.

== Incumbents ==
- President - Andris Bērziņš
- Prime Minister - Valdis Dombrovskis

== Events ==
=== March ===
- 4 March - Latvia applies to enter the eurozone in 2014, in a move which could see it become the 18th member of the bloc.
- 29 March - More than 220 people are rescued from two ice floes that broke off of Latvia and were blown into the Gulf of Riga.

=== June ===
- 20 June - A major fire breaks out at the Riga Castle, the Latvian presidential palace.
- 21 June - Riga Castle fire
  - Latvian authorities say the overnight fire has extensively damaged Riga Castle, the medieval fortress that houses the Baltic nation's National History Museum, and presidential residence.

=== November ===
- 21 November - 54 people are killed and 55 injured at the Zolitūde shopping centre roof collapse in Riga.
