= 2014 in Latvia =

- Decades: 1990s; 2000s; 2010s; 2020s
- See also: Other events of 2014; Timeline of Latvian history

Events in the year 2014 in Latvia.

== Incumbents ==
- President – Andris Bērziņš
- Prime Minister – Valdis Dombrovskis (until 22 January), Laimdota Straujuma (starting 22 January)

== Events ==
=== January ===
- January 1 – Latvia officially adopts the Euro as its currency and becomes the 18th member of the Eurozone.

=== October ===
- October 4 – Latvia votes in a parliamentary election; Laimdota Straujuma's centre-right government keeps its majority.
