= ManaBalss.lv =

Latvian petition website

- Formation: June 1, 2011; 15 years ago
- Founder: Kristofs Blaus, Jānis Erts
- Founded at: Latvia
- Type: Online petitions
- Headquarters: Riga, Latvia
- Official language: Latvian, also available Russian
- Chairman of the Board: Imants Breidaks
- Board Member: Valdis Pornieks
- Board Member: Annija Emersone
- Website: manabalss.lv

ManaBalss.lv (literally My Voice in English) is a civic organization based in Latvia and launched in June 2011 to provide a possibility for the citizens of Latvia to promote their initiatives and gain support for these initiatives for further submission to Saeima - national parliament of Latvia. Activities of ManaBalss.lv are characterised by very good rate of success: approximately half of the public initiatives are either supported by Saeima or are in the process of review.

== History ==
ManaBalss.lv was created in the late 2010 - early 2011 by social activists Kristofs Blaus and Jānis Erts as a response to the mismanagement of the governance in the country which led to the 2008 Latvian financial crisis. The name of the portal in Latvian means 'My Voice'.

The first initiatives were launched in June 2011 and were aimed at making the information about the offshoring operations more open to the general public. Over the first week the initiative gathered more than 10 000 supporters and as a response to this Saeima urgently changed the legislation.

According to data published by ManaBalss.lv, since 2011, from the 38 initiatives reaching the decision - a final vote in the legislator, 31 have been approved and have changed laws or normative acts. Additional 21 initiatives currently are in the review process in the parliament. In 2019, 3 initiatives have been supported and implemented by the Saeima in legislation, 13 initiatives have been submitted to Saeima. 190 initiative applications have been examined, of which 56 initiatives have been published for public voting.

Since 2011 ManaBalss has had more than 285 000 unique users and more than 1.41 million votes – a considerable number for a county of 1.95 million. Every year 25-30% of the population are visitors of the platform - though not all of them choose to vote.

ManaBalss.lv is considered to be a successful case of internet activism where online petitioning and well-organised lobbying activities can help in the democratization of society and country. According to ManaBalss.lv it is the most successful national citizen legislative initiatives' platform in the world.

== Funding, handling of initiatives ==
Major part of the activities of ManaBalss.lv are financed by the donations of individual users, part of the financing is attracted as local and international grants as well as comparatively small donations from organizations. In year 2019 ManaBalss had donations from 24 000 users, while overall since 2011, 59 000 individuals have donated to the organization.

Initiatives can be submitted by any citizen of Latvia. Each initiative should comply with minimum requirements, e.g. it should be implemented by the state or municipal institutions through legislatory changes and other activities, the initiative should be constructive and feasible.

After the initiative is approved by ManaBalss.lv it should collect 10 000 supporters in order to be submitted to Saeima.
