= Aleksandrs Kublinskis =

Latvian composer

- Born: 11 September 1936
- Origin: Riga, Latvia
- Died: January 24, 2018 (aged 81)
- Genres: pop, jazz
- Occupations: composer, songwriter
- Years active: 1965–1987

Aleksandrs Kublinskis (11 September 1936 – 24 January 2018) was a Soviet and Latvian composer. He is famous for the song "Noktirne" which is devoted to Riga, as well as over 200 other songs. Kublinskis used to co-operate with the Latvian group Eolika, the Moscow group "Akkord", as well as with Larisa Mondrus, Muslim Magomayev, and other singers.
