= Pēteris Cimdiņš =

Latvian politician (1944–2024)

Minister of Higher Education and Science
- In office 21 December 1995 – 13 February 1997
- Preceded by: position established
- Succeeded by: Tatjana Koķe

Personal details
- Born: 21 August 1944 Vecpiebalga Parish, Reichskommissariat Ostland
- Died: 25 January 2024 (aged 79)
- Party: LZS
- Education: University of Latvia
- Occupation: Biologist

Pēteris Cimdiņš (21 August 1944 – 25 January 2024) was a Latvian biologist and politician. A member of the Latvian Farmers' Union, he served as Minister of Higher Education and Science from 1995 to 1997.

Cimdiņš died on 25 January 2024, at the age of 79.
