= Egils Helmanis =

Latvian politician and businessman

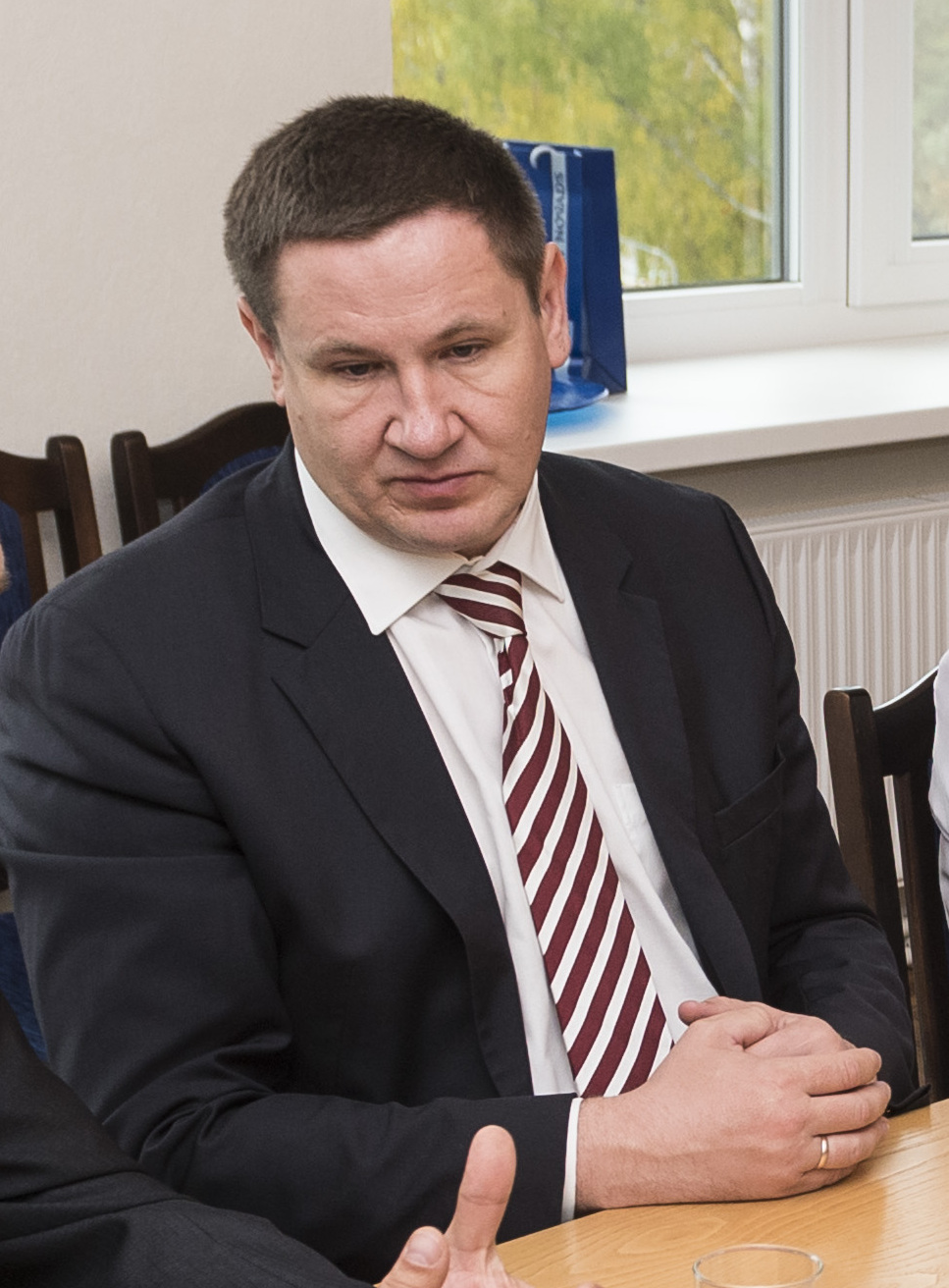
- Helmanis in 2015
- Born: December 30, 1971 (age 54); Talsi, Latvian SSR, Soviet Union
- Occupation: Deputy of Ogre Municipality
- Political party: National Alliance

Egils Helmanis (born 30 December 1971) is a Latvian politician, businessman and close combat instructor. From 2017 to 2026, he was Chairman of the Council of Ogre Municipality. He has been embroiled in various controversies.

Before entering politics, Helmanis was a businessman and military-style martial arts instructor.

== Political activities ==
Helmanis joined the nationalist All for Latvia! party in 2008. He was elected to the Council of Ogre Municipality in 2009 from the common All for Latvia!/Civic Union list, becoming Deputy Chairman in 2011. After spending some time in opposition, Helmanis became the Chairman on 16 June 2017 after the 2017 municipal elections, being re-elected in 2021 and 2025.

In July 2025, Helmanis was injured in a Russian drone strike in Ukraine, where he was on an official visit to provide aid to the Armed Forces of Ukraine. He became incapacitated and was undergoing treatment, so he has been unable to work or perform his duties for a long time because he has not applied for state secret clearance and on February 3, 2026, he announced his resignation because he was again in the hospital.

== Controversies ==
In 2009, Helmanis was charged with being part of an extortion racket and was convicted in April 2018, which was then appealed. Helmanis stated throughout that being charged with extortion would not interfere with his duties on the Ogre Municipality Council.

In 2016, Helmanis admitted that he had trained members of the right-wing anti-immigrant vigilante group Tēvijas Sargi (Guardians of the Fatherland).

Before the 2017 municipal elections, Helmanis demanded before that local journalists sign a document agreeing not to pry into his private life.

In early 2018 Helmanis was in conflict with Latvian Radio journalist Edgars Kupčs, who in an investigative report uncovered highly questionable practices in a tender for Ogre municipal vehicles that seemed to rule out everything but high-line luxury models with a lengthy range of optional extras. Helmanis demanded the story be retracted from both LR and LSM, which was refused.

On 21 August 2019, the Corruption Prevention and Combating Bureau detained Helmanis over suspected misappropriation of municipal funds, but the criminal process was later terminated due to lack of evidence.

In December 2022, Helmanis met with sanctioned Russian businessman Petr Aven and discussed displaying Aven's porcelain collection at the Ogre History and Art Museum. The exhibition, scheduled to open on February 1, 2023, was postponed amid protests, including from the museum staff. The dispute between the municipality and the museum escalated when Helmanis sealed the museum director's office and took disciplinary action against museum staff in April. On April 20, more than 100 people protested outside the Ministry of Environmental Protection and Regional Development, calling for the dismissal of Helmanis. The National Alliance called the actions of Helmanis unacceptable and misguided and described the meeting and planned exhibition a mistake, but did not call for Helmanis to resign from his position.

In December 2024, the Latvian Ombudsman Juris Jansons announced that violations of political neutrality and misinformation were found in the Independence Day greetings of Egils Helmanis to the local residents in the municipal newsletter Savietis. The greeting espoused anti-civil unions overtones, stating that: "At a time when we should be fighting for a mood of masculinity and militancy in the nation, we have a government fighting for the right of two men to marry. (..) Look for the Kangars [fictional character] in the Latvian people".
