= Juris Ekmanis =

Latvian scientist

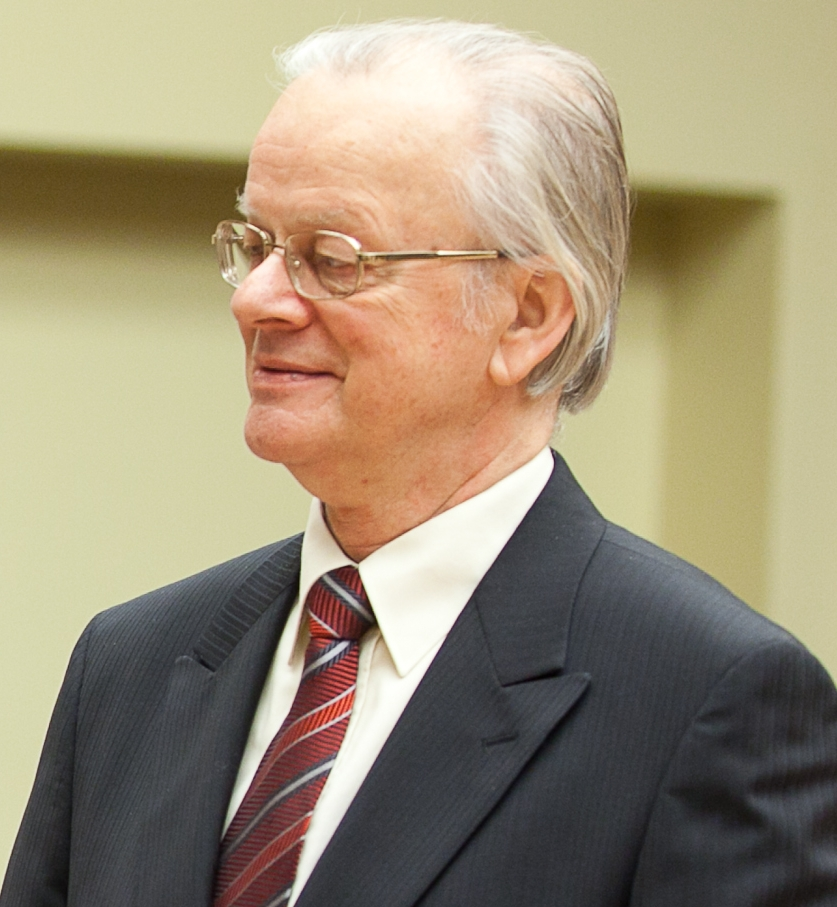
- Ekmanis in 2012
- Born: 2 December 1941; Riga, Reichskomissariat Ostland (now Latvia)
- Died: 9 April 2016 (aged 74)
- Education: Riga Polytechnical Institute
- Occupation: Physicist

Juris Ekmanis (2 December 1941 – 9 April 2016) was the President of Latvian Academy of Sciences (2004—2012).

== Career ==
He was appointed Junior Research Associate at the Riga Polytechnical Institute from 1961 to 1986, and Professor from 1986 to 1994. He was visiting professor at Cornell University (Ithaca), Iowa State University (Ames), University of California, Berkeley, United States in 1974 and at Manchester University in 1993. In 1976 he became a visiting scientist at McGill University (Montreal). In 1990 he became the Director of the Institute of the Physical Energetics at the Latvian Academy of Sciences, and he was the President of said academy from 2004 to 2012.

== Honours and awards ==
- Order of the Three Stars (Latvia), 2009
- The Latvian Academy of Sciences Alfreds Vitols Prize, 1999
