= Ruta Šaca-Marjaša =

Latvian politician

Deputy of the Fifth & Sixth Saeima of Latvia
- In office July 6, 1993 – November 1, 1998

Personal details
- Born: Ruta Maksovna Shats-Mariash; February 4, 1927 Riga, Latvia
- Died: November 19, 2016 (aged 89) Riga, Latvia

Ruta Šaca-Marjaša (born Ruta Maksovna Shats-Mariash; Russian: Рута Максовна Шац-Марьяш, Рута Марьяш; 4 February 1927 – 29 November 2016) was a Jewish Latvian lawyer, writer, poet, politician, and former Deputy of the Latvian Parliament of 5th (1995) and 6th (1998) convocations. She lived in Riga.

She was awarded the Order of the Three Stars of IV (1995) and III (2000) degrees.

== Sources ==
- Ruta Shats-Mariash, Caleidoscope of My Memory (Рута Шац-Марьяш, Калейдоскоп моей памяти) - Rīga : Acis, 2003; ISBN 9984-9566-5-2 (in Russian)
