= 2023 in Latvia =

- Decades: 2000s; 2010s; 2020s
- See also: Other events of 2023; Timeline of Latvian history

Events in the year 2023 in Latvia.

== Incumbents ==
- President: Egils Levits (until July 8), Edgars Rinkēvičs (from July 8)
- Prime Minister: Arturs Krišjānis Kariņš (until September 15); Evika Siliņa onwards

== Events ==
Ongoing COVID-19 pandemic in Latvia

- May 31 - 2023 Latvian presidential election
- August 14 - Latvian Prime Minister Krišjānis Kariņš announces his resignation and says his government will step down this week citing a breakdown in relations within his multi-party government.
- September 15 - Evika Siliņa takes office as Prime Minister of Latvia.

== Deaths ==
- 6 January: Jānis Vagris, 92, politician, Chairman of the Presidium of the Supreme Soviet of the Latvian Soviet Socialist Republic (1985–1988).
- 8 January: Gundars Bērziņš, 63, accountant and politician, minister of finance (2000–2002).
- 28 January: Joachim Siegerist, 75, German-Latvian journalist, author and conservative politician.
- 31 March: George Nagobads, 101, physician.
- 30 April: Mihails Vasiļonoks, 74, ice-hockey player.
- 14 May: Regīna Razuma, 71, actress and ballerina.
- 5 June: Lilita Ozoliņa, 75, actress.
- 6 June: Gints Freimanis, 38, footballer.
