= Dzintra Grundmane =

Latvian basketball player (1944–2024)

Dzintra Grundmane (11 August 1944 – 16 January 2024) was a Latvian basketball player. She was a recipient of the Order of the Three Stars. Born in Riga in 1944, she died on 16 January 2024, at the age of 79.
