= Day of the Restoration of Latvian Independence =

National holiday in Latvia

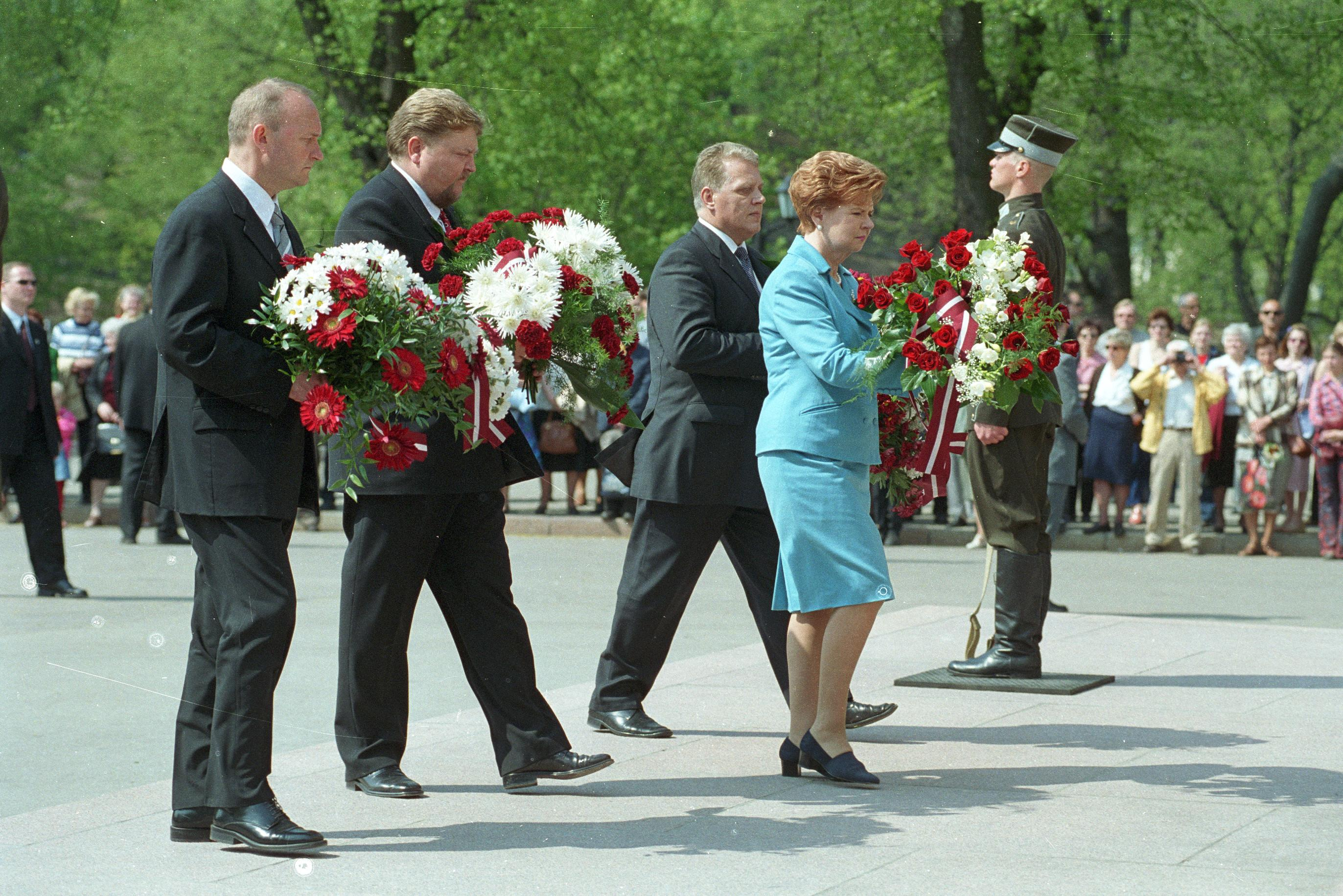
Minister of Foreign Affairs Indulis Bērziņš, Speaker of Saeima Jānis Straume, President of Latvia Vaira Vīķe-Freiberga and Prime Minister Andris Bērziņš (from left to right) laying flowers at the foot of Freedom Monument to commemorating Day of the Restoration of Latvian Independence in 2002

Day of the Restoration of Latvian Independence (Latvian: Latvijas Republikas Neatkarības atjaunošanas diena) is a Latvian national holiday and event celebrated annually on 4 May. It marks the Declaration On the Restoration of the Independence of the Republic of Latvia by the Supreme Soviet of the Latvian SSR on 4 May 1990.

This was the official declaration of the independence from the Soviet Union; the legal declaration, which brought international recognition and the full restoration of independence, was adopted as a constitutional law "On the Statehood of the Republic of Latvia" by the Supreme Council of Latvia on 21 August 1991, a day after the Restoration Act of Estonia during the August coup. The Soviet Union recognised the Baltic republics of Estonia, Latvia and Lithuania as independent states on 6 September 1991. The Russian SFSR had done so already on 24 August 1991.

== Observances ==
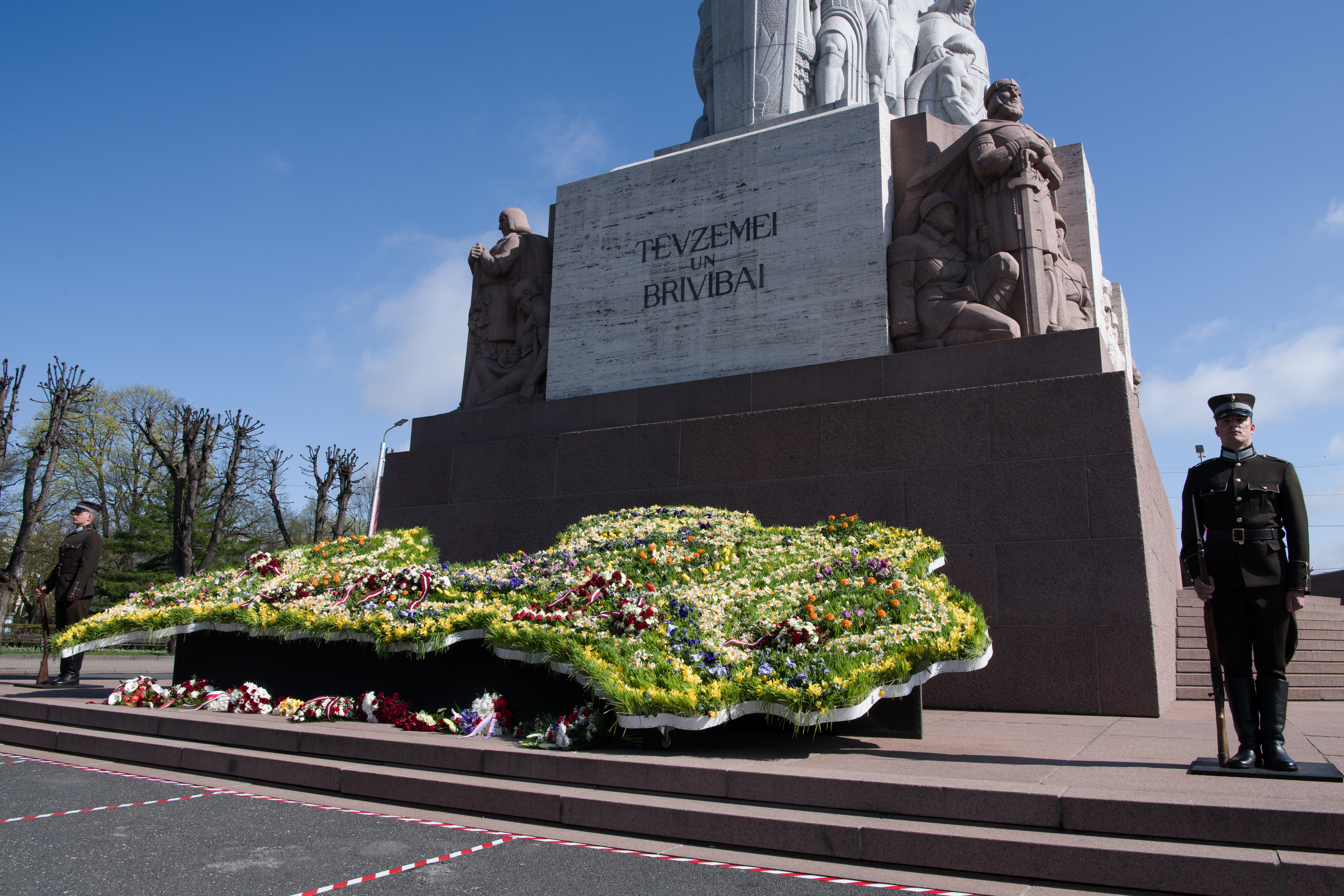
The "Latvia of Flowers" art object is an annual tradition on May 4th, where the public place their flowers in an outline of Latvia at the Freedom Monument

The Freedom Celebration or the 4 May Freedom Celebration is an annual military parade in Latvia which has been held since 2012 in honor of the Day of the Restoration of Latvian Independence. It is one of the main events of the day. The parade is usually the first of two full military parades held per year in the country, with the other being held on 11 November, Lāčplēsis Day (Latvian: Lāčplēša diena), the commemoration day for soldiers who fought for the independence of Latvia. Every year, the parade is held in various Latvian cities outside of the capital of Riga. The parade usually starts at 11:00 am and typically involves around between 500-1,000 troops of the Latvian National Armed Forces, including personnel representing the Land Forces, Navy, Air Force, National Guard, State Border Guard, Special Tasks Unit, Military Police and military academies. Being a NATO member, the parade also features military servicemen from NATO countries such as the United States, Canada and Germany. The following is a list of parades by year:

- Rēzekne (2012)
- Kuldīga (2013)
- Valmiera (2014)
- Jelgava (2015)
- Krāslava (2016)
- Liepāja (2017)
- Madona (2018)
- Jēkabpils (2019)
- Cancelled due to the COVID-19 pandemic
- Daugavpils (2021)
- Saldus (2022)
- Alūksne (2023)
- Rēzekne (2024)
- Talsi (2025)

If the holiday is on a weekend date, the following Monday is an observance date. As per the Riga celebrations, a flower laying ceremony is always held at the capital's Freedom Monument.

=== The White Tablecloth tradition ===
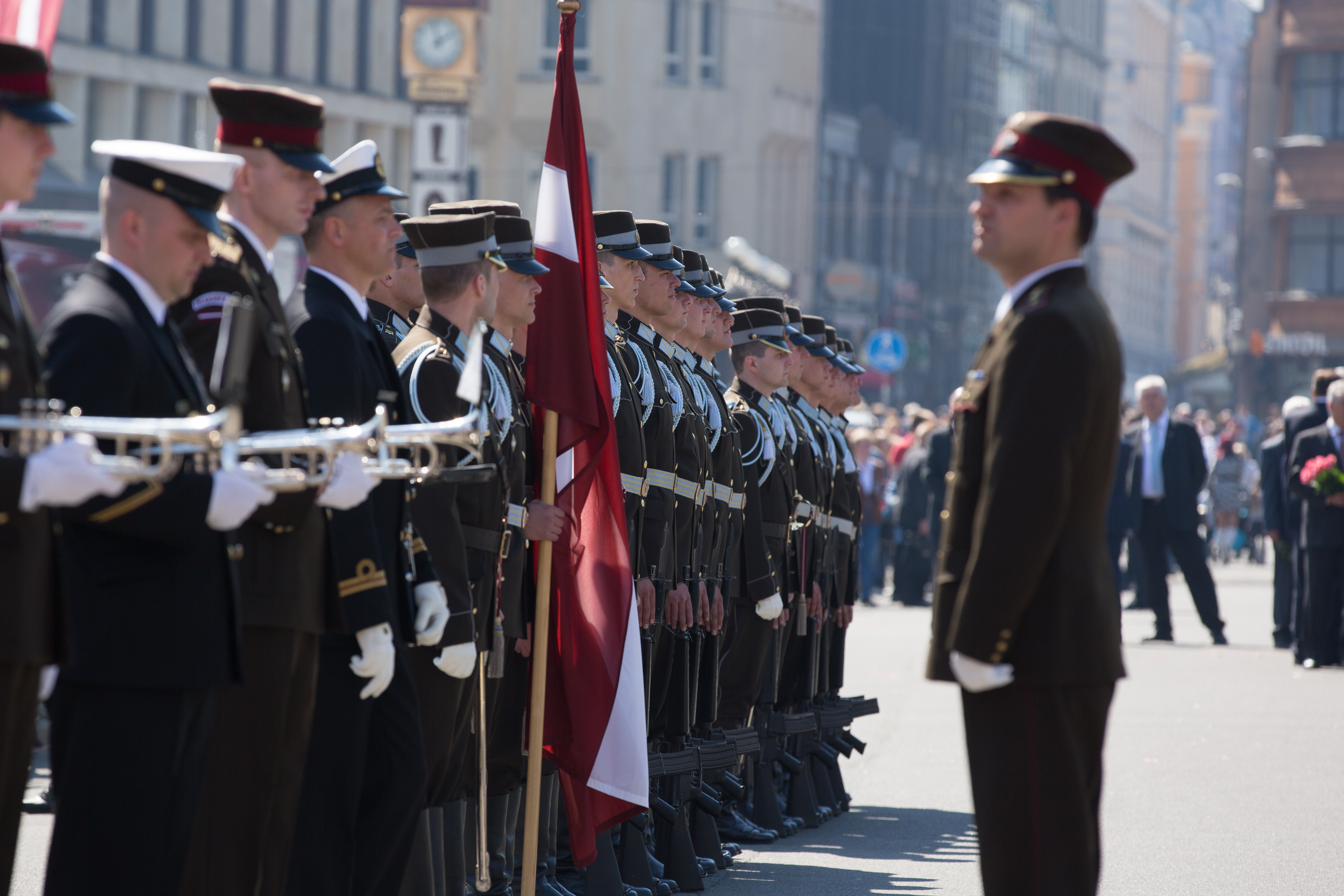
The NAF Staff Band at a flower laying ceremony at the Freedom Monument in 2016.

In 2016 an initiative called "White Tablecloth Day" (Latvian: Baltā galdauta diena; also the White Tablecloth Celebration, Baltā galdauta svētki) was launched by the Ministry of Culture in context of Latvian Centennial celebration (Latvia 100) inviting people of all communities to gather around a table and celebrate together.

The goal of White Tablecloth Celebration was said to be the "strengthening of the tradition of gathering family, friends, neighbours, and communities around the table on 4 May to consciously celebrate our country and honour those who helped to create and protect it. We generate the feeling of celebration together on White Tablecloth Day as each person brings something to add to the table and to the conversation. White Tablecloth Day is a reminder that the restoration of the independence of the Republic of Latvia was the result of relentless action, courage and audacity of certain individuals".
