= Independence Day (Latvia) =

Public holiday in Latvia

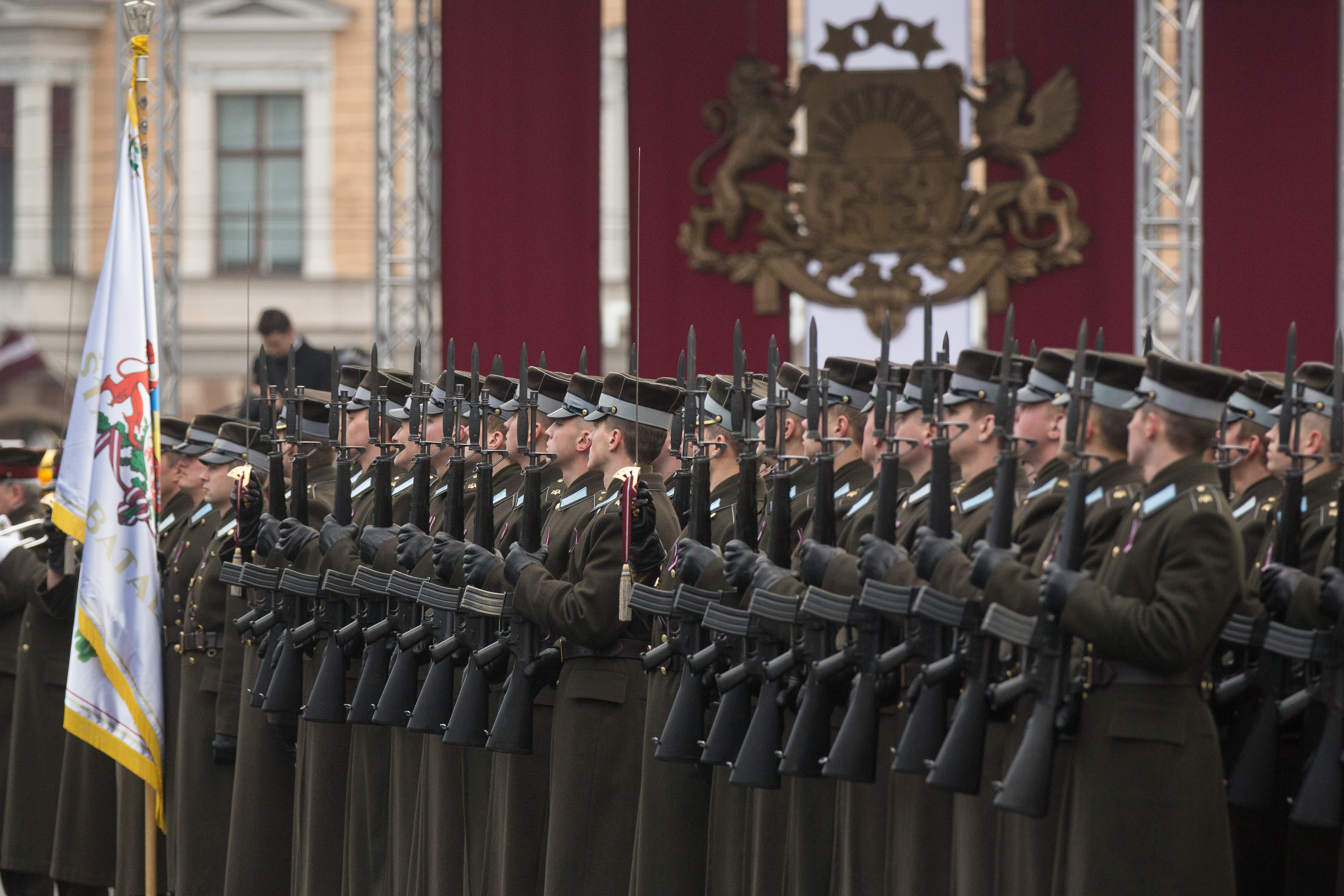
- A column of soldiers at a flower-laying ceremony at the Freedom Monument, 18 November 2016
- Observed by: Latvian people
- Type: National
- Date: 18 November
- Frequency: Annual

Latvia's Independence Day, officially known as the Proclamation Day of the Republic of Latvia, is celebrated annually on 18 November in Latvia. It marks the anniversary of the Proclamation of Independence of Latvia by the People's Council of Latvia in 1918.

== Observances ==
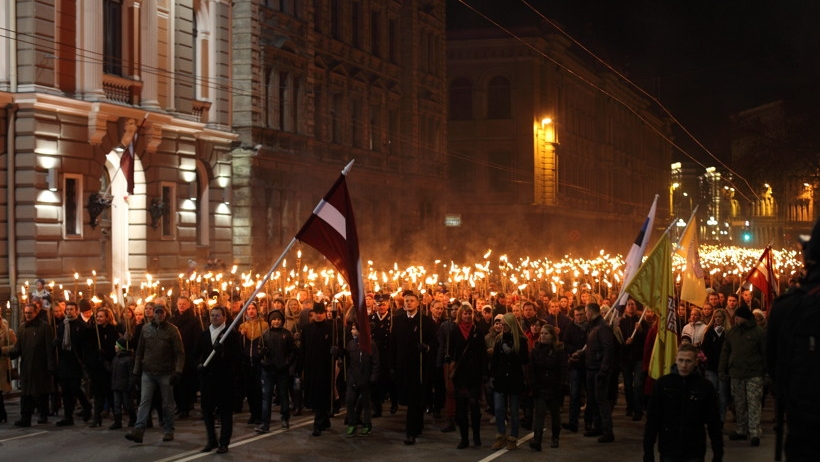
Torchlight procession in Riga, Latvia

Various public events take place all over the country, including concerts and fireworks. Torchlight processions held by various organizations have been part of Proclamation Day celebrations and Lāčplēsis Day celebrations since the 1920s. The largest torchlight procession organized by the National Alliance takes place in the capital city Riga and attracts thousands of participants every year. Its route through the streets of the city centre traditionally starts at the monument of Kārlis Ulmanis, the first prime minister of Latvia, and ends at the Freedom Monument. A popular modern tradition established in 2009, is for people all over the world to sing the Latvian national anthem Dievs, svētī Latviju! at the same time (21:00 EET).

=== Parade ===
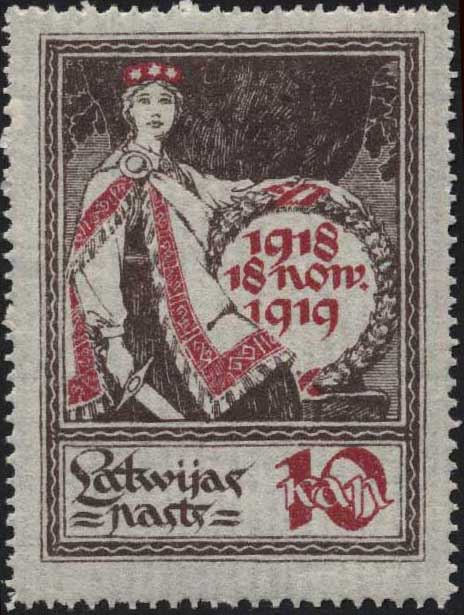
A Latvian stamp from 1919 marking the first anniversary of independence

Another tradition with a long history is the Latvian National Armed Forces parade, which nowadays is held at 11 November Embankment in Riga and was reintroduced in 1998. After the restoration of the independence, the first parade of the National Armed Forces took place in Riga at the Freedom Monument in 1993, which was dedicated to the 75th anniversary of the founding of the Latvian state. The parade was also broadcast on Latvian Television. In 1998, the national holiday parade was held for the first time on 11. novembra krastmala (11 November Embankment). The limited and small area near the Freedom Monument was mentioned as the main reason for the change of the parade venue, as it did not allow the demonstration of all types of units of the National Armed Forces, as well as heavy weapons and military equipment. In 1998, armed formations of the Ministry of Defense and the Ministry of the Interior, as well as a company from the peacekeeping Baltic Battalion (LATBAT), stood in the parade dedicated to the 80th anniversary of the proclamation of Latvia. For the first time, the Navy ships, which were anchored in the Daugava opposite the embankment, took part in the parade. There was also the introduction of a 21-gun salute from cannons fired from the Ballast Dam with 100 mm anti-tank cannons by soldiers of the Artillery Division of the Mobile Rifle Brigade. For the first time, the staff of all five National Guard brigades also took part in the National Day parade and the Jaunsardze ('Youth Guard') of Kazdanga Agricultural Technical School marched as the closing unit. Since Latvia joined NATO in 2004, allied partner countries have participated in the parade.
