= Raimonds Graube =

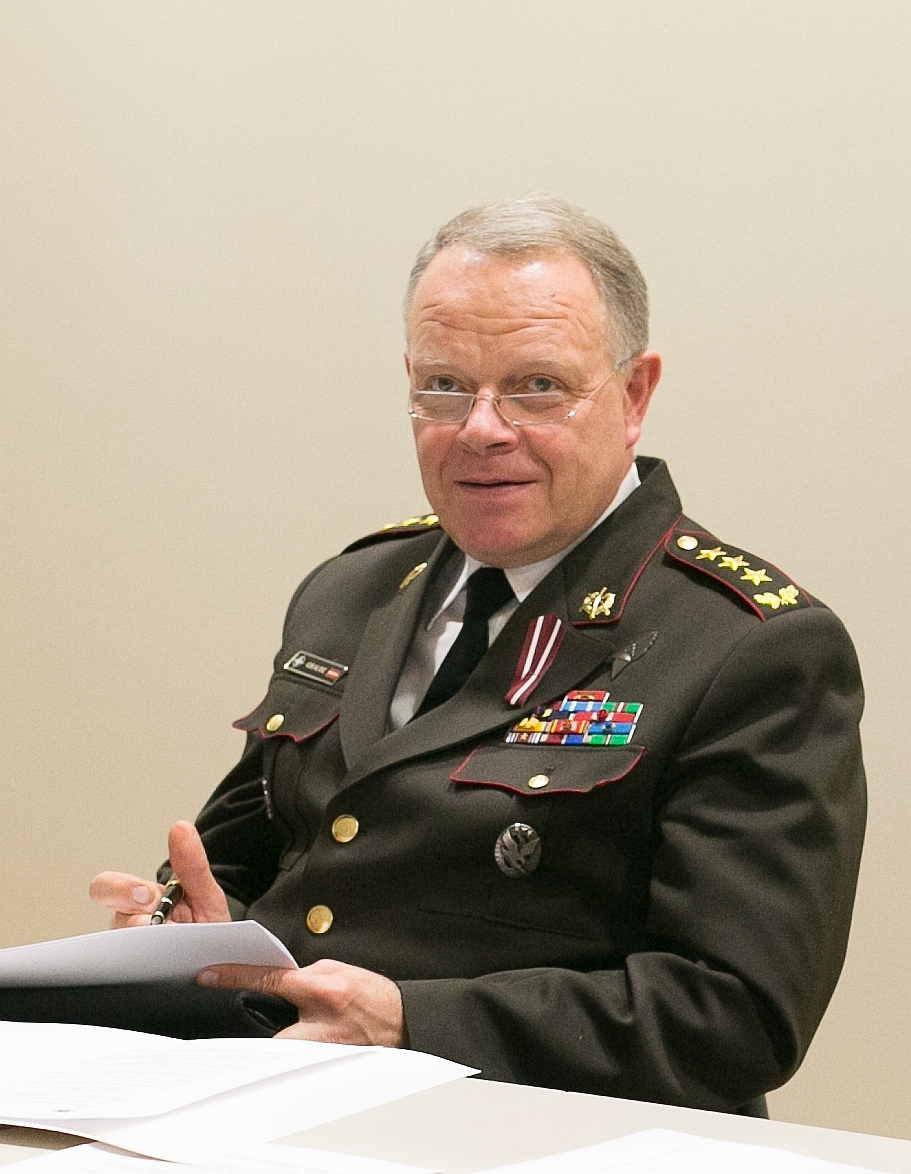
Graube in 2015.

Raimonds Graube (born 28 February 1957) is a former Latvian officer with the rank of lieutenant general. From 1999 to 2003 and from 2010 to 2017, he was the Commander of the Joint Headquarters of Latvia.

== Life and career ==
Raimonds Graube was born in 1957 in Riga (then the capital of the Latvian SSR). He graduated from the 2nd Secondary School, then Vocational School No. 2. In 1976 he was drafted into the Soviet Army. As part of Latvia's secession from the Soviet Union, Graube joined the National Guard in 1991 and received the rank of major in 1993. After various other assignments within the organization, he rose to Chief of Staff of the National Guard in 1995 and to its commander (with the rank of lieutenant colonel) in 1998.

In 1999, he was promoted to colonel and commander of the Latvian National Armed Forces. Three years later, in November 2002, he was promoted to brigadier general. He remained in the post of army chief until 2003, when he was succeeded by naval officer Gaidis Zeibots. After completing his four-year term as commander of the army, Graube served as State Secretary in the Ministry of Defence, responsible for Latvia's NATO integration. From there, he moved in 2008 to represent his country's armed forces to NATO and the EU, but returned to the Ministry of Defence after only a year. In 2010, he once again assumed command of the Latvian Armed Forces and was promoted to Major General. Two years later, he was promoted to Lieutenant General. After being granted a third term as commander of the army in 2014, he requested early retirement in October 2016. On January 27, 2017, he handed over command to his successor, Leonīds Kalniņš, and officially retired on February 28, his 60th birthday.

== Education ==
During his service, Graube attended the following educational institutions and training courses:

- 1996: Netherlands Defense Academy
- 1997–1998: Joint Services Command and Staff College
- 2001: Royal College of Defence Studies
- 2003: NATO Defense College
- 2004–2005: National Defense University

== Personal life ==
He is married and the father of two sons. Besides his native language, he also speaks fluent Russian and English.

== Awards ==
| Knight of the Order for Merits to Lithuania (2001) |
| French National Order of Merit (2001) |
| 2nd Class of the Order of the Cross of the Eagle (2003) |
| Officer of the Order for Merits to Lithuania (2003) |
| Royal Norwegian Order of Merit (Commander with Star) (2012) |
| First Class of the Order of the Cross of the Eagle (2012) |
| Commander of the Order for Merits to Lithuania (2013) |
