= Egils Leščinskis =

Latvian Army officer (born c. 1967)

Brigadier General Egils Leščinskis
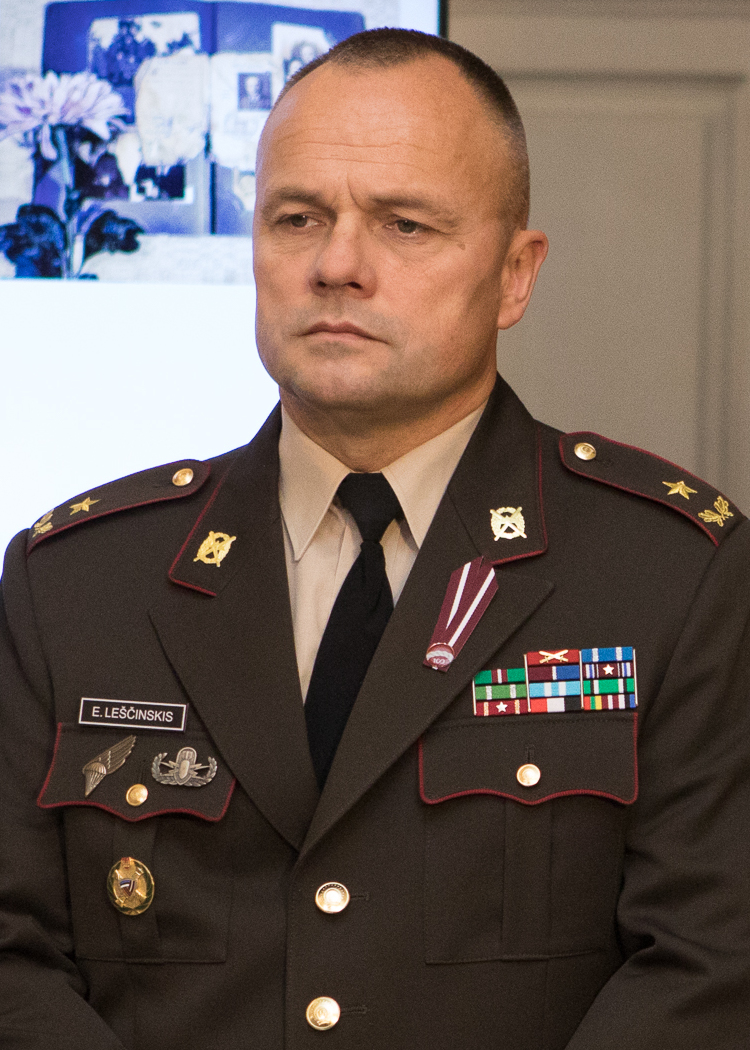
- Brigadier General Egils Leščinskis, c. 2019
- Born: July 18, 1967 (age 59); Latvian SSR
- Education: Riga Technical University
- Military career
- Allegiance: Latvia
- Service years: 1991–present
- Rank: Brigadier General
- Commands: Latvian National Guard
- Awards: Commander of the Order of Viesturs

Brigadier General Egils Leščinskis (born July 18, 1967) is an active duty Latvian officer who has been serving as the Commanding General of the Latvian National Guard since May 2019.

== Early life ==
Leščinskis was born in 1967 in what was then the Latvian SSR. In 1992 he graduated from Riga Technical University.

== Military career ==
As part of the regaining of national independence in Latvia, Egils Leščinskis joined the Latvian armed forces as they were being rebuilt in 1991/92 following the collapse of the Soviet Union. He gained experience in international military service at the NATO headquarters in Belgium and as a lecturer at the Baltic Defence College. In 2004 he took part in the peace operation in Iraq (Multi-National Force - Iraq). He also attended numerous advanced training courses at military academies abroad. From 2011 to 2015 Leščinskis was the rector of the National Defence Academy of Latvia. In August 2018 he took over the post of Chief of Staff of the Latvian National Guard.

On May 30, 2019, he replaced Ainārs Ozoliņš as commander of the Latvian National Guard and was appointed brigadier general on November 5, 2019.

== Personal life ==
Leščinskis is married and has two daughters.
