= Commander of the Latvian National Guard =

The Commander of the Latvian National Guard (Latvian: Zemessardzes komandieri) is the service chief of the Latvian National Guard. They are the principal military advisor to the Commander of the Joint Headquarters and the President of Latvia on matters pertaining to the National Guard. The commander is the highest-ranking officer in the National Guard, usually ranking Brigadier general or Colonel.

== List of Commanders ==
Photo	Name	Term Start	Term End	Notes
	Colonel Juris Eihmanis	1996	1998	
	Colonel Juris Zeibārts	2008	October 15, 2011	
	Brigadier General Leonīds Kalniņš	October 15, 2011	August 25, 2016	
	Brigadier General Ainārs Ozoliņš	August 25, 2016	May 30, 2019	
	Colonel Egils Leščinskis	May 30, 2019	February 21, 2023	
	Brigadier General Kaspars Pudāns	February 21, 2023	January 24, 2025	
	Colonel Krjukovs		Present	

== See also ==
- Chief of the National Guard Bureau
