= Juris Eihmanis =

Juris Eihmanis (born September 15, 1954, in Riga) is a former Latvian National Guard Colonel who served as Commander of the Latvian National Armed Forces in 1998.

== Early life ==
He was born on September 15, 1954, in Riga. He studied at Riga Secondary School No. 50, and then studied radio engineering at the Riga Polytechnic Institute until 1984. He then worked at the Olaine Chemical Reagents Factory.

== Military career ==
After the Declaration On the Restoration of Independence of the Republic of Latvia, he joined the newly formed Latvian National Guard, and participated in the creation of the National Guard battalions, once of which he commanded, the 14th National Guard Battalion (1992–1993). He later became the commander of the National Guard from 1996 to 1998. He completed his training at the United States Army War College in Carlisle, Pennsylvania. After returning from the United States in 1998, he was appointed the commander of the National Armed Forces on 25 June. He ended up serving for less than six months. The money spent from the National Guard budget on the renovation of Eihmanis' apartment became the reason for the punishment of several officials, as well as the dismissal of Eihmanis himself from the post on 10 December.

== Post-military ==
On May 21, 1999, the Prosecutor General's Office charged Eihmanis with abuse of office. Until 2002, Eihmanis worked as a lecturer at the Baltic Defense College. In 2002, the Riga Regional Court decided to evict Eihmanis from his apartment and recover from him the costs of repairing the apartment in the amount of more than 30,000 Latvian lats, with the prosecutor's office saying that he as commander of the NAF, acquired it "illegally, contrary to the law and good morals".

== Awards ==
- Order of the Three Stars, 3rd class
- Royal Norwegian Order of Merit, 3rd Class
