= Leonīds Kalniņš =

Latvian general

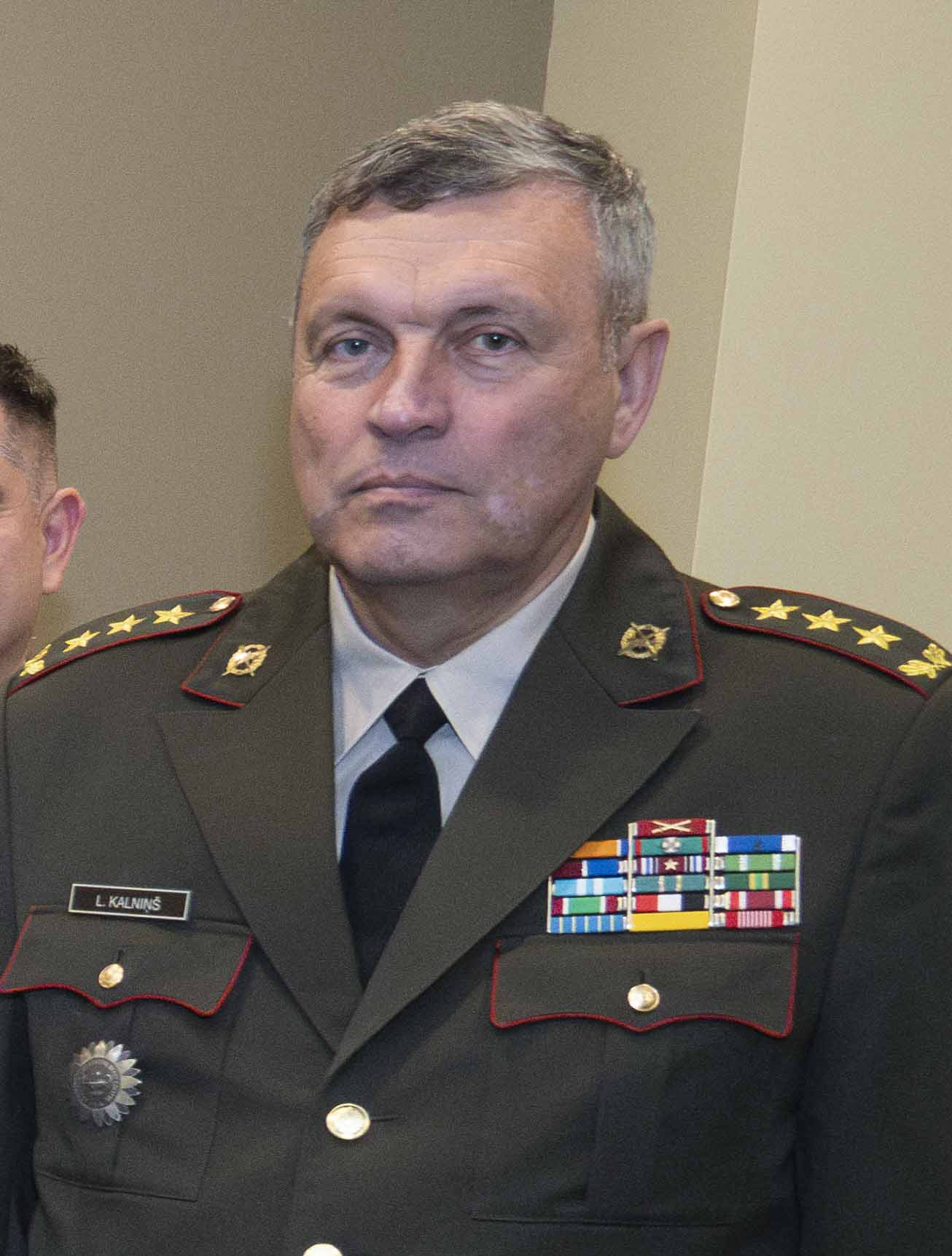
- Leonīds Kalniņš in 2024
- Born: 13 February 1957 (age 69); Tomsk Oblast, RSFSR, Soviet Union
- Allegiance: Soviet Union (1975–1991); Latvia (1997–present)
- Branch: Soviet Air Defence Forces; Latvian National Guard
- Service years: 1975–1991 and since 1997
- Rank: Lieutenant General
- Commands: Commander of the Joint Headquarters; Commander of the Latvian National Guard

Lieutenant General Leonīds Kalniņš (born February 13, 1957, in Tomsk Oblast, RSFSR, Soviet Union) is a Latvian former general, who served as the Commander of the Joint Headquarters.

== Early life and Soviet Army career ==
He was born in 1957 in the Russian Pervomaysky District into the family of a mathematics and physics teacher who was repressed in 1949. He attended the Dobele R. Eihes Secondary School (now the Dobele State Gymnasium) in his youth. After graduating in 1975, he began his service in the Soviet Armed Forces, attending the Vilnius Higher Airborne Defense School. In 1990, he graduated from the Military Engineering Radiotechnical Academy of Soviet Air Defence Forces named after Marshal of the Soviet Union Leonid Govorov (now the Ivan Kozhedub National University of the Air Force) in Ukraine.

== Latvian National Armed Forces ==
In 1997, he began his service in an infantry battalion in the Latvian National Armed Forces. His first official position he took was as the Chief of the Operational Planning Board of the Latvian National Guard Headquarters. In 2006, Kalniņš was appointed as deputy commander of the Latvian Contingent in Iraq. Between 2010 and 2013, he studied at the Baltic Defence College in Estonia and the United States Army Command and General Staff College in Kansas. In November 2016, he was promoted to the post of Commander of the Joint Headquarters of the NAF and was confirmed by the Saeima as Chief of defence at the end of the year. He began his duties as NAF Commander on January 27, 2017. He is a recipient of the Order of Viesturs. On November 21, 2024, he was replaced as the Commander of the Joint Headquarters by Major General Kaspars Pudāns.
