= Latvian Special Tasks Unit =

Military special forces unit

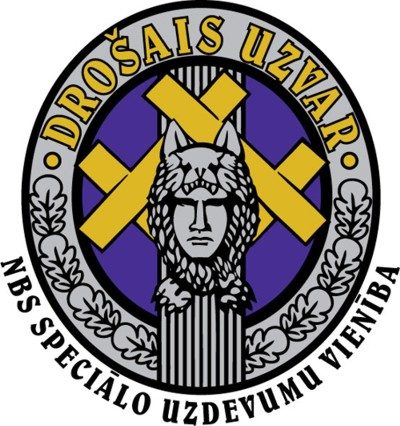
Special Task Unit's crest

The Special Tasks Unit (Latvian: Speciālo uzdevumu vienība, SUV) is a special force unit falling under the Special Operations Command, branch of the Latvian National Armed Forces (NBS). It was established in September 1991. The unit is specially organized, trained and equipped for the performance of high-danger tasks. The soldiers in the unit continuously train to enhance their professional preparedness and are provided with specialized equipment in order to carry out their tasks efficiently. Their motto is "The brave man wins" (Latvian: Drošais Uzvar).

== Structure ==
- Headquarters
- Staff Company
- Combat Squadron A
- Combat Squadron B
- Combat Squadron C
- Combat Support Squadron
- Psychological Operations Team
- Training Squadron
- Ranger Unit

The Special Tasks Unit consists of trained professional soldiers who are specialized in certain areas including airborne operations, amphibious operations, close-quarters battle, combat and patrolling in urban areas, combat control, combat search and rescue, commando style raids, counterterrorism and hostage rescue crisis management, defusing and disposal of bombs and land mines, executive protection, fast tactical shooting, force protection, hand-to-hand combat, heliborne, intelligence gathering, irregular warfare, lifeguarding, marksmanship, medical evacuation, military dog handler, naval boarding, NBCR on operations in contaminated environments, search and rescue in hazardous environments (e.g. cave, mountain, sea, urban, and others as assigned), SERE, sniper, special reconnaissance, tactical driving, tactical emergency medical services, tactical SCUBA diving, underwater demolition, and other skills related to special warfare.

== Mission ==
The unit is developed in a way, which allows it to provide assistance to law enforcement and state security, institutions in counterterrorist and hostage rescue management operations and perform special tasks within the entire range of military operations: airborne, defense, attack and detention operations, sea landing, and underwater operations, operations in a special environment (built-up territories, forests, limited visibility conditions, mountains, arctic and cold weather conditions, deserts and hot weather conditions), as well as search and rescue operations in collaboration with the Latvian Naval Forces and Latvian Air Force.

The main mission of The Special Tasks Unit is to:

- Perform black operation, clandestine operation, covert operation, and special warfare operations for national defense and security interests
- Perform search and rescue operations on land and sea
- Participate in counterterrorist and hostage rescue operations

== Equipment ==
The Special Tasks Unit's equipment are:

- Bulletproof vest
- Knee and elbow padding
- Ballistic/tactical helmet
- Heckler & Koch MP5
- Heckler & Koch G36
- Steyr AUG
- Glock 17
- M249 SAW
- L96A1
- Many other weapons and equipment

== Insignia ==
=== Ranger Unit ===
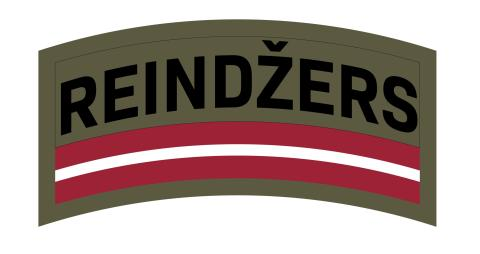
Ranger sub-unit identification patch

The newly formed Ranger Unit has a distinctive patch signifying its members or also known as a qualifications patch in the Latvian National Armed Forces.
