= Military ranks of Latvia =

The Ranks and insignia of the Latvian National Armed Forces are the military insignia used by the Latvian National Armed Forces.

Historically the Land Forces wore collar insignia. Today shoulder boards are worn by almost all personnel of the NAF, save for the Staff Battalion, which uses a modified form of the old collar insignia.

== Current ranks ==
=== Commissioned officer ranks ===
The following are the current insignia of commissioned officers.

NATO code	OF-10	OF-9	OF-8	OF-7	OF-6	OF-5	OF-4	OF-3	OF-2	OF-1
Latvian Land Forces
Latvian Land Forces			Ģenerālleitnants	Ģenerālmajors	Brigādes ģenerālis	Pulkvedis	Pulkvežleitnants	Majors	Kapteinis	Virsleitnants	Leitnants
Latvian Naval Forces
Latvian Naval Forces			Viceadmirālis	Kontradmirālis	Flotiles admirālis	Jūras kapteinis	Komandkapteinis	Komandleitnants	Kapteiņleitnants	Virsleitnants	Leitnants
Latvian Air Force
Latvian Air Force			Ģenerālleitnants	Ģenerālmajors	Brigādes ģenerālis	Pulkvedis	Pulkvežleitnants	Majors	Kapteinis	Virsleitnants	Leitnants
NATO code	OF-10	OF-9	OF-8	OF-7	OF-6	OF-5	OF-4	OF-3	OF-2	OF-1

=== Other ranks ===
The rank insignia of non-commissioned officers and enlisted personnel.

NATO code	OR-9	OR-8	OR-7	OR-6	OR-5	OR-4	OR-3	OR-2	OR-1
Latvian Land Forces
Latvian Land Forces	Augstākais virsseržants	Galvenais virsseržants	Štāba virsseržants	Virsseržants	Seržants	Kaprālis	Dižkareivis	Kareivis
Latvian Naval Forces
Latvian Naval Forces	Vecākais virsniekvietnieks	Virsniekvietnieks	Vecākais bocmanis	Bocmanis	Seržants	Kaprālis	Dižmatrozis	Matrozis
Latvian Air Force
Latvian Air Force	Augstākais virsseržants	Galvenais virsseržants	Štāba virsseržants	Virsseržants	Seržants	Kaprālis	Dižkareivis	Kareivis
NATO code	OR-9	OR-8	OR-7	OR-6	OR-5	OR-4	OR-3	OR-2	OR-1
