= Kaspars Pudāns =

Latvian military officer

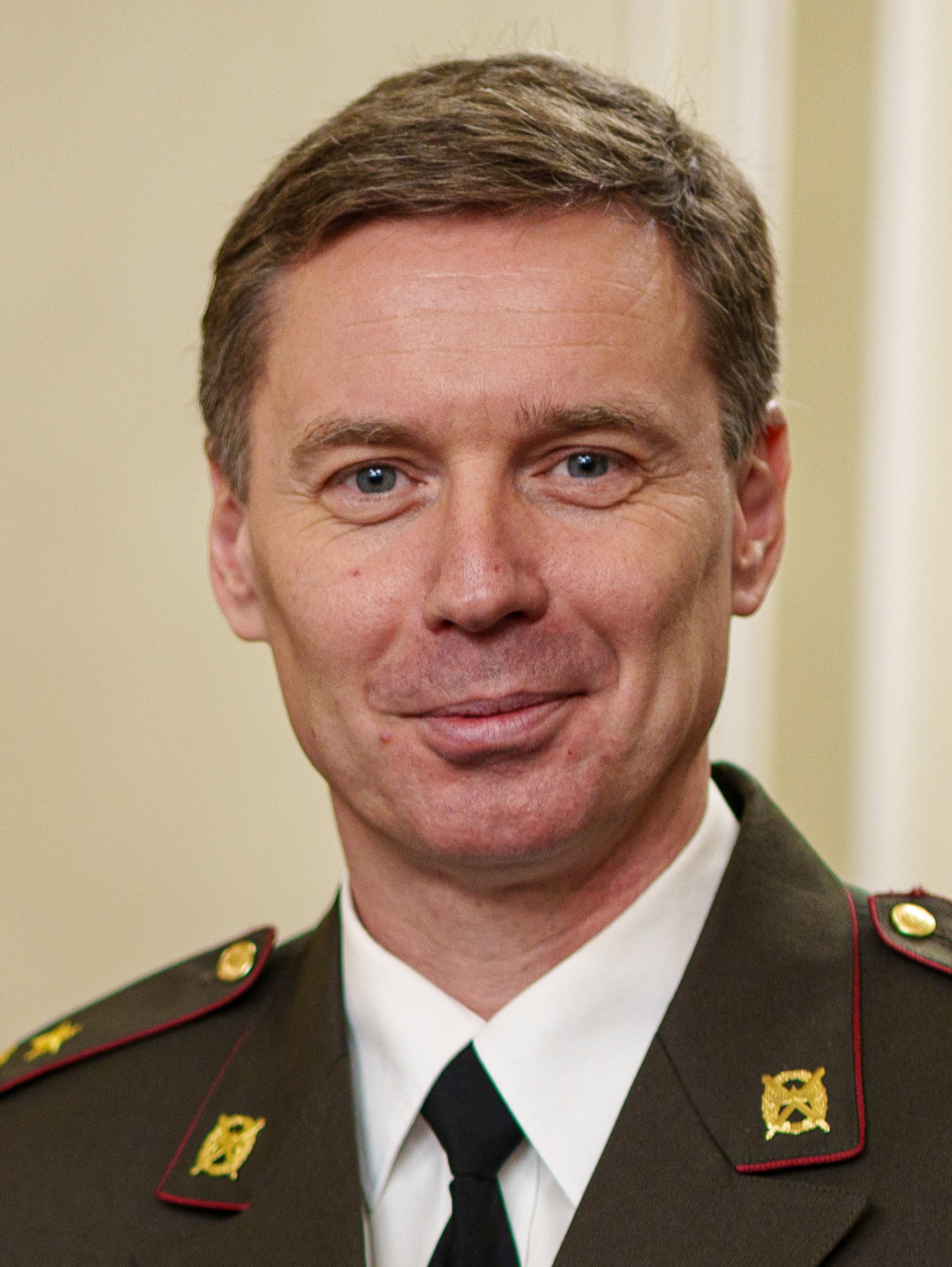
- Pudāns in 2024
- Born: March 23, 1976 (age 50); Jēkabpils, Latvian SSR, Soviet Union
- Allegiance: Latvia
- Branch: (Latvia) Latvian National Armed Forces
- Service years: 1994–present
- Rank: Lieutenant general
- Awards: Order of Viesturs (3rd Class); Order of the Lion of Finland (Commander First Class)

Kaspars Pudāns (born March 23, 1976) is a senior Latvian military officer who serves as the Commander of the Joint Headquarters of the Latvian National Armed Forces. He assumed command on January 27, 2025, succeeding Lieutenant General Leonīds Kalniņš. Prior to his appointment, served as the Commander of the Latvian National Guard from 2023 to 2025.

== Early life and education ==
Pudāns was born on March 23, 1976, in Jēkabpils. He enlisted in the Latvian National Armed Forces in 1994. He attended the National Defence Academy of Latvia, graduating in 1998 with a commission as an infantry platoon leader and a degree in law. He went on to pursue further academic qualifications, earning a master's degree in Comprehensive Quality Management from Riga Technical University in 2012.

== Military career ==
In 1999, he graduated from the Infantry Basic Officer Course, United States Army Infantry School. From 2003 to 2007, he served as a staff officer in the Operations Department (J-3) of the Joint Headquarters. Following this assignment, he spent three years in Brussels, Belgium, serving as a staff officer at the Latvian Military Representation to NATO and the European Union. In 2002 and 2007, he took officer courses in France and in 2014, he took the Army Command and Staff Course at the General Jonas Žemaitis Military Academy, Lithuania.

From 2013 to 2014, he studied at the Baltic Defence College in Estonia, graduating from the Higher Command Studies Course in 2021. Upon returning to Latvia, Pudāns held multiple leadership roles within the Land Forces. In 2015, he deployed to Afghanistan as the Deputy Commander of the Latvian contingent under the NATO-led Resolute Support Mission. Between 2016 and 2021, Pudāns held high-level staff positions at the Joint Headquarters, serving as the Chief of the Operations Branch and later as the Chief of the Intelligence Department. From 2021 to 2023, he took command of the National Guard's 1st Riga Brigade. In February 2023, he was appointed Commander of the Latvian National Guard.

== Commander of the Armed Forces ==
In late 2024, Major General Pudāns was nominated to succeed Leonīds Kalniņš commander of the armed forces and on December 19, 2024, the Saeima confirmed his appointment unanimously. He officially assumed the post on January 27, 2025. On June 18, 2026, President Edgars Rinkēvičs issued an order promoting Pudāns to the rank of lieutenant general, the highest attainable rank in the Latvian military.

== Awards and honors ==
- Order of Viesturs, 3rd Class (Latvia, 2020)
- Commander First Class of the Order of the Lion of Finland (Finland, 2025)
- Latvian National Armed Forces Commander's Honorary Badge
- Commendation from the Latvian Minister of Defence

== Personal life ==
Pudāns is married and has three daughters. In addition to his native Latvian, he is fluent in English, French, and Russian. His hobbies include historical literature, jogging, and stand-up paddleboarding.
