= Dobele State Gymnasium =

School in Dobele, Latvia

Coordinates: 56°37′12″N 23°16′31″E

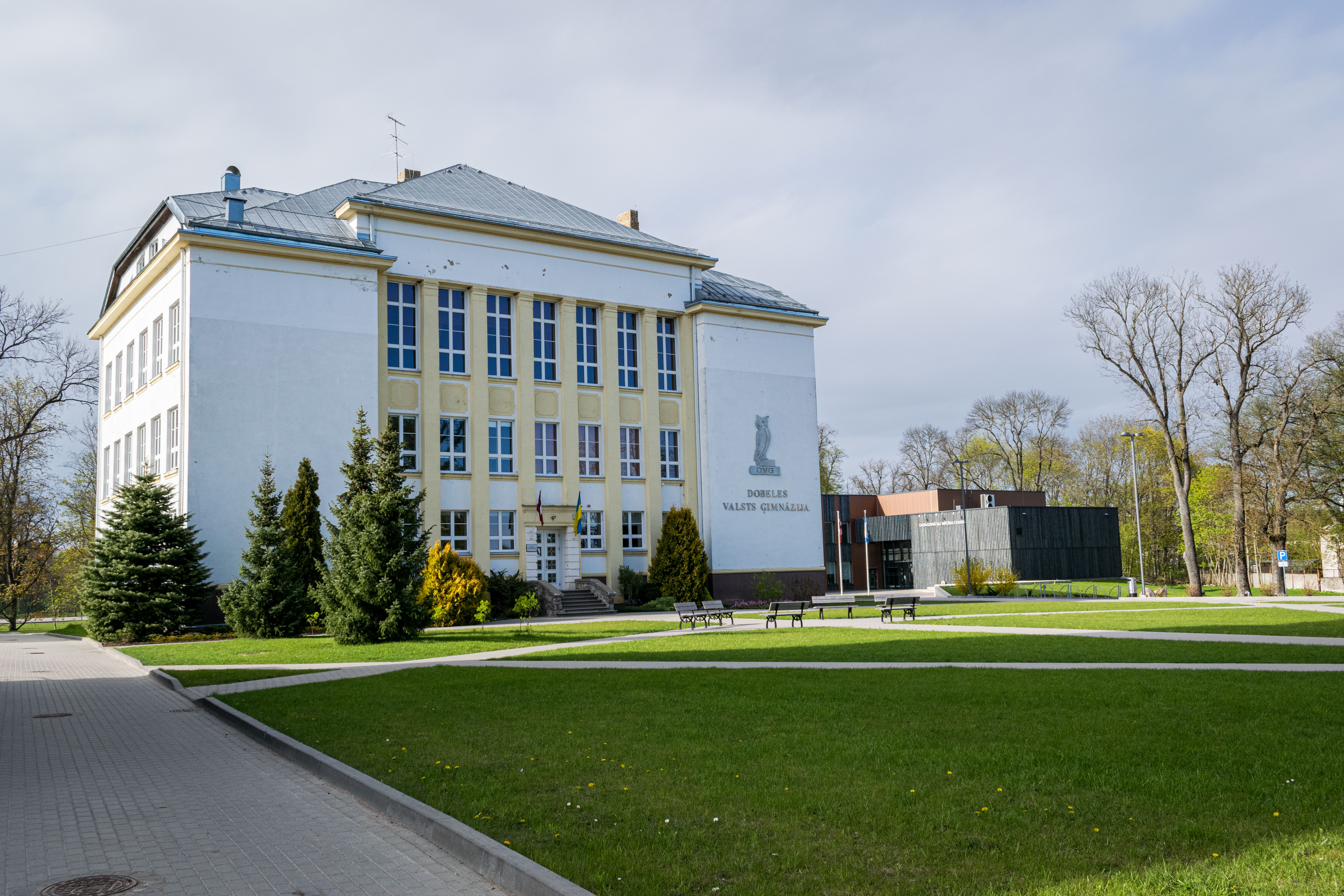
Dobele State Gymnasium Dobeles Valsts ģimnāzija

Location
- Dzirnavu iela 2, Dobele, Dobeles novads, Latvia LV-3701

Information
- Type: State
- Established: 1922
- Headmaster: Inese Didže
- Grades: 7-12
- Enrollment: 474
- Classes: 18
- Language: Latvian
- Website: www.dvg.lv
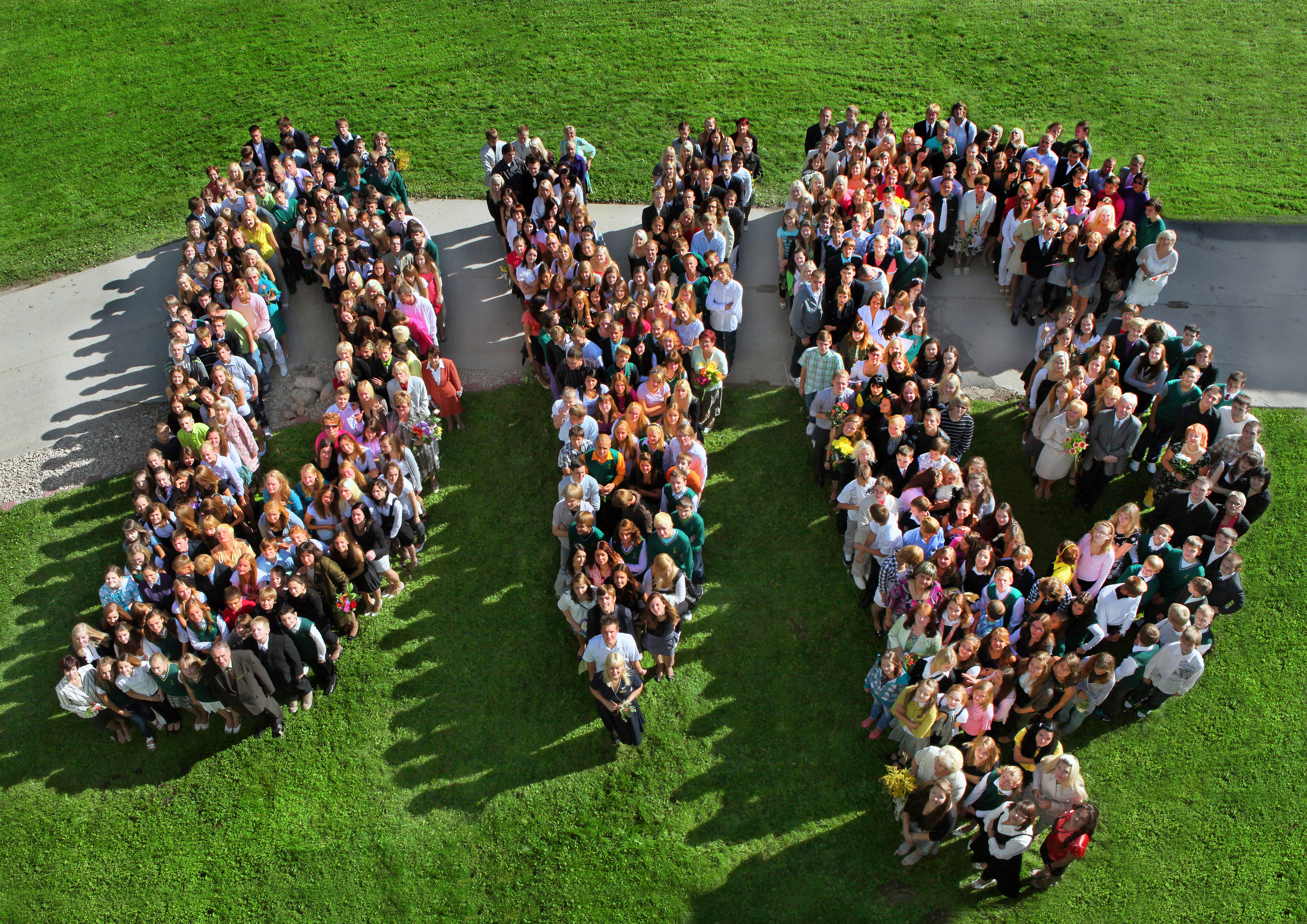
- Teachers and students in 2011

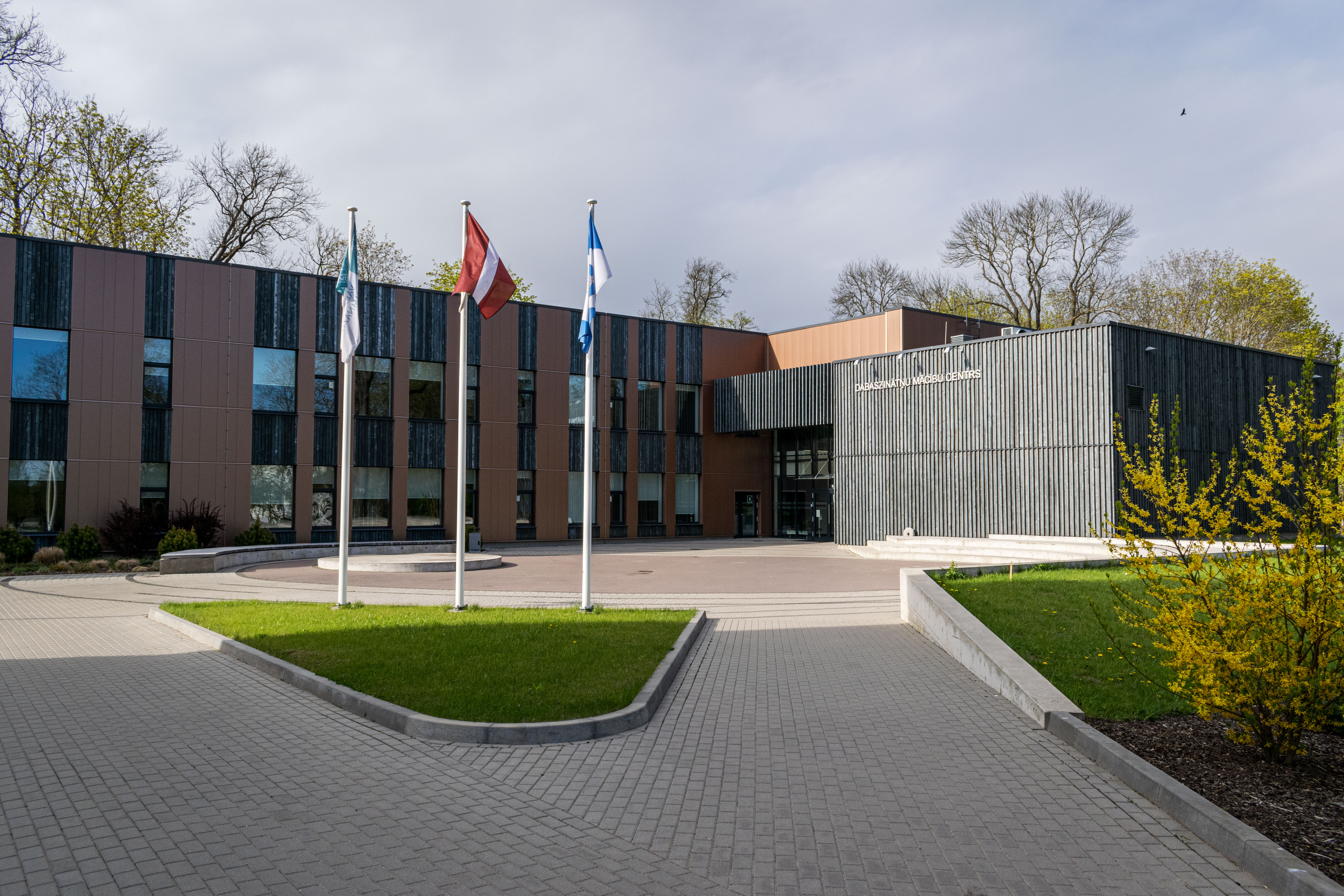
- Nature science centre

Dobele State Gymnasium (Latvian: Dobeles Valsts ģimnāzija) is a gymnasium (pre-university high school) in Dobele, Latvia, founded in 1922.

The official language of the school is Latvian, and students can also study English, Russian, and German as additional languages. Students in grades 10-12 concentrate on either Mathematics and Science, Humanities, or Business and Commerce.

== Alumni ==
- Leonīds Kalniņš
