= Gaidis Zeibots =

Latvian military personnel

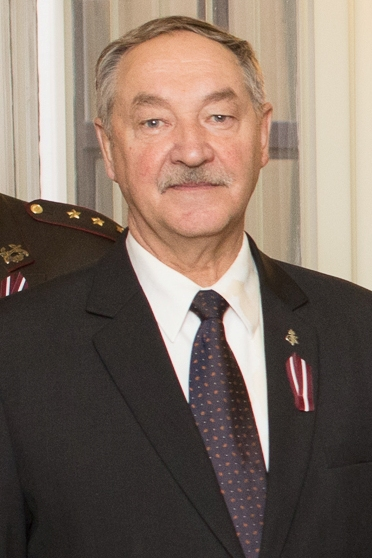
- Gaidis Zeibots
- Born: 26 June 1945 (age 81); Cirgaļu, Valka District, Latvian SSR, Soviet Union
- Military career
- Allegiance: Soviet Union (1969–1991); Latvia (1991–2006)
- Branch: Soviet Navy; Latvian Naval Forces
- Rank: Vice Admiral
- Commands: Commander of the Joint Headquarters

Admiral Gaidis Andrejs Zeibots (born 26 June 1945 in Cirgaļu, Valka district) was Commander of the Joint Headquarters, head of the Latvian National Armed Forces from 2003 to 2006. He was elected on 30 January 2003 by the Latvian Parliament. Zeibots previously served as the Chief of staff of the Latvian Naval Forces.

== Early life and education ==
He was born on 26 June 1945, shortly after the end of World War II in Europe. He graduated in 1969 from the Alexander Popov Naval Radio-electronic Academy. In 1980, he graduated from the Grechko Naval Academy in Leningrad and from the Military Logistics Academy in 1987. He is a 1999 graduate of the US Army War College.

== Military career ==
=== Soviet Navy ===
Commissioning into the Soviet Navy in 1969, he was first posted to the Estonian Soviet Socialist Republic to serve as Head of the Radiotechnical Service of the frigate of the Tallinn Naval Base. the next couple of year was spent serving and rising through the ranks on the destroyer Stepenny. From 1980-1985 - Deputy Chief of Staff of the Missile Ship Division in Baltiysk and from 1985-1988 - Deputy Commander of the Liepaja Naval Base. In 1988, he became division commander for warships based out of Gdynia in the Polish People's Republic.

=== Latvian Navy ===
Following the dissolution of the Soviet Union and the restoration of Latvian Independence, he joined the newly established Latvian National Armed Forces, becoming head of the Department of the Naval Forces and Commander of the Naval Forces. From 2000-2001, he was Executive Secretary of the Ministry of Defence of Latvia for the issue of NATO integration, before serving as Deputy Commander of the National Armed Forces of Latvia from 2001-2003. On 31 January 2003, his term began as Commander of the Joint Headquarters. His term ended after three and a half years on 6 July 2006.

== Awards ==
- Order of Three Stars (1997)
- Norwegian Order of Merit (1998, Norway)
- Order of the Lithuanian Grand Duke Gediminas (2001, Lithuania)
- Order of Viesturs (2004)
- Order of the Cross of the Eagle (2005, Estonia)
- Order of Prince Henry (2003, Portugal)
- Certificate of Honor of the President of Latvia (2020)
- Medal of the National Armed Forces
- Medal of the Latvian Naval Forces
