= Commander of the Joint Headquarters (Latvia) =

Military position in Latvia

- Latvijas Nacionālo bruņoto spēku komandieris
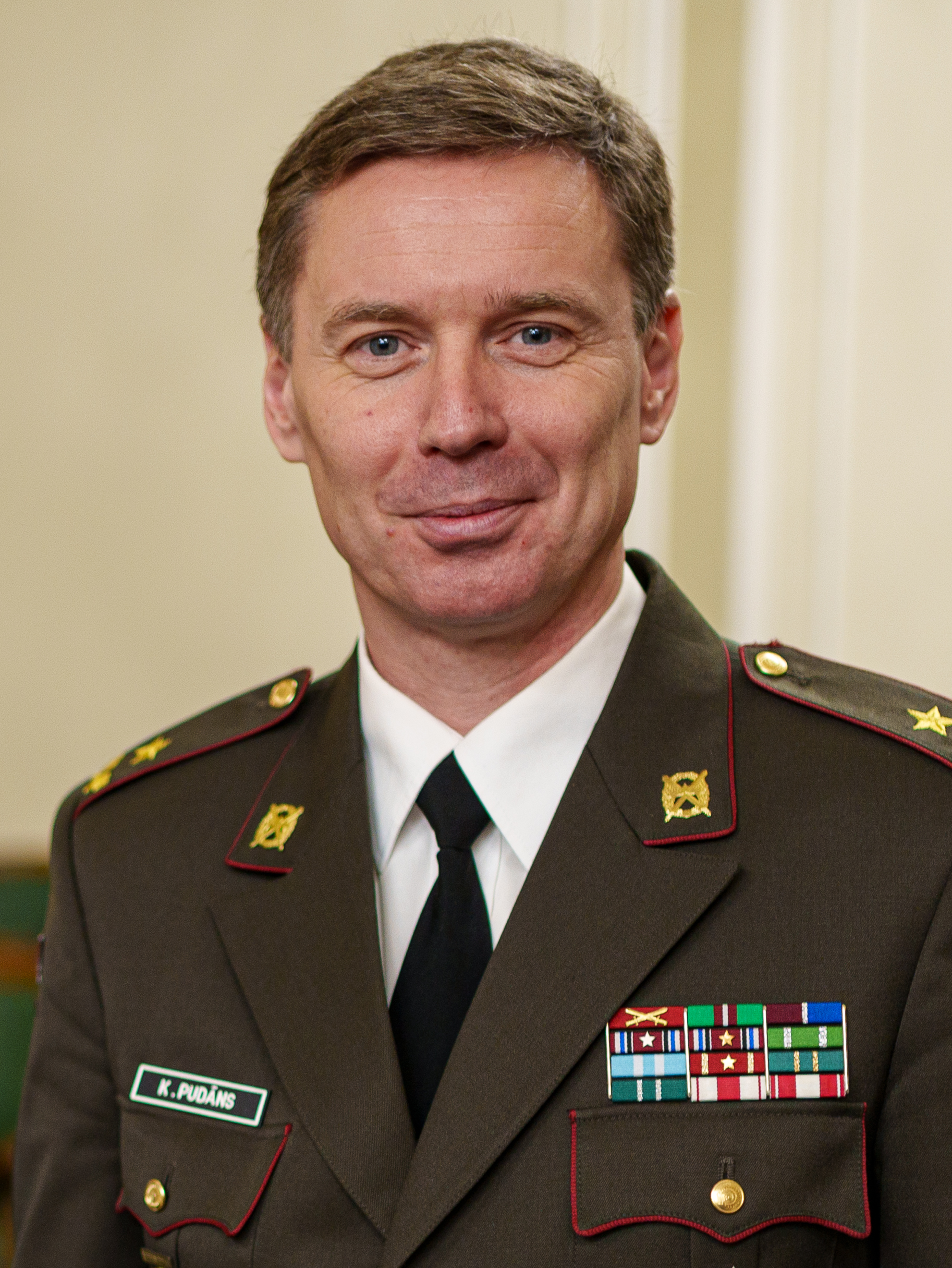
- Incumbent; Major General Kaspars Pudāns since 21 November 2024
- Latvian National Armed Forces
- Member of: The Joint Headquarters
- Reports to: Ministry of Defence
- Website: mil.lv

The Commander of the Joint Headquarters is Chief of the Latvian National Armed Forces and the national defence organisations.

== List of Chiefs ==
=== Armed Forces Commander (1919–1940) ===
No.	Portrait	Armed Forces Commander	Took office	Left office	Time in office
1	Dāvids Sīmansons	General; Dāvids Sīmansons (1859–1933) (Supreme Commander of the Latvian Armed Forces)	10 July 1919	16 October 1919	98 days
2	Jānis Balodis	General; Jānis Balodis (1881–1965) (Supreme Commander of the Latvian Armed Forces)	16 October 1919	1 April 1921	1 year, 167 days
3	Mārtiņš Peniķis	General; Mārtiņš Peniķis (1874–1964)	1 April 1921	23 February 1924	2 years, 328 days
4	Pēteris Radziņš [lv]	General; Pēteris Radziņš (1880–1930)	23 February 1924	25 April 1928	4 years, 62 days
(3)	Mārtiņš Peniķis	General; Mārtiņš Peniķis (1874–1964)	25 April 1928	14 November 1934	6 years, 203 days
5	Krišjānis Berķis	General; Krišjānis Berķis (1884–1942)	14 November 1934	20 June 1940	5 years, 219 days
6	Roberts Kļaviņš [lv]	General; Roberts Kļaviņš (1884–1941)	20 June 1940	24 December 1940	187 days

For period from 1940 to 1992, see Chief of the General Staff.

=== Commander of the Joint Headquarters (1992–present) ===
No.	Portrait	Commander of the Joint Headquarters	Took office	Left office	Time in office	Ref.
1	Dainis Turlais	Colonel; Dainis Turlais (born 1950)	29 October 1992	25 October 1994	1 year, 361 days	
2	Juris Dalbiņš	Colonel; Juris Dalbiņš (born 1954)	25 October 1994	8 June 1998	3 years, 226 days	
3	Juris Eihmanis	Colonel; Juris Eihmanis (born 1954)	25 June 1998	10 December 1998	168 days	
4	Raimonds Graube	Brigadier General; Raimonds Graube (born 1957)	1 February 1999	31 January 2003	3 years, 364 days	
5	Gaidis Andrejs Zeibots	Vice Admiral; Gaidis Andrejs Zeibots (born 1945)	31 January 2003	6 July 2006	3 years, 156 days	
6	Juris Maklakovs	Major General; Juris Maklakovs (born 1964)	6 July 2006	6 July 2010	4 years, 0 days	
7	Raimonds Graube	Lieutenant General; Raimonds Graube (born 1957)	6 July 2010	27 January 2017	6 years, 205 days	
8	Leonīds Kalniņš	Lieutenant General; Leonīds Kalniņš (born 1957)	27 January 2017	21 November 2024	7 years, 299 days	
8	Kaspars Pudāns	Major General; Kaspars Pudāns	21 November 2024	Incumbent	1 year, 294 days	

== See also ==
- Latvian National Armed Forces
