= Latvian National Guard =

National Guard of the Republic of Latvia
- Latvijas Republikas Zemessardze
- Emblem of the Latvian National Guard
- Founded: 23 August 1991; 35 years ago
- Country: Latvia
- Type: Light Infantry; Military volunteer
- Size: 10,000 personnel
- Part of: Latvian National Armed Forces
- Garrison/HQ: Maiznīcas iela 5, Rīga, LV-1001
- Anniversaries: 23 August
- Website: https://www.zs.mil.lv

Commanders
- Commander: Colonel Aivars Kryukovs

Insignia
- Roundel

The Latvian National Guard or NG (Latvian: Latvijas Republikas Zemessardze, ZS) is a part of the Latvian National Armed Forces. The National Guard is a basic land component, consisting of volunteers who perform traditional national guard duties such as crisis response and support for military operations. It consists of the Staff Headquarters and 4 brigades (formally - regions or novadi), which are divided into 18 battalions. The National Guard continued its development also after Latvia joined NATO.

== History ==
The National Guard was established on August 23, 1991 by the Supreme Council of the Republic of Latvia as a voluntary public military self-defense organization. Its roots can be traced to the pre-World War II Aizsargi organization. It is the largest NBS structure in terms of numbers. The National Guard has always played an essential role in the national defense system by allowing the public to be involved in national defense. A number of National Guard battalions have been transformed into high-readiness reserve forces, which can be deployed immediately on international military operations.

The youth organization of the National Guard, the Youth Guard (Latvian: Latvijas Republikas Jaunsardze, JS), was established in 1992. It is the largest youth movement in Latvia, bringing together young people from the age of 10 to 21.

An aviation component of the National Guard was introduced in 1993, with a fleet of ex-Soviet DOSAAF light aircraft and gliders. In 2000 the aviation component, the roundel of which was a red-white auseklis, became part of the Air Force.

In the 1990s, the National Guard troops (much like the regular armed forces) were equipped with leftover Soviet weapons like the AKM, AK-74, SKS rifles and TT and Makarov pistols, alongside early procurements of CZ 82 pistols from the Czech Republic and Slovakia. In the late 1990s, a gradual switch to the Swedish-made Automatkarbin 4 began. It, in turn, was phased out by the H&K G36 starting from the late-2010s. A number of Carl Gustaf m/45 submachine guns, donated by Sweden, were also used by the Guard until a phaseout the 2020s.

== Mission ==
The main task of the National Guard is to support the regular Land Force units by defending the national territory during military threat and to perform NBS combat support and combat logistics functions. At the same time, the National Guard continues providing assistance to the public regarding crisis control, as well as to the Latvian State Police regarding provision of public law and order, and continue the safeguarding of sites of national security importance.

== Organization ==
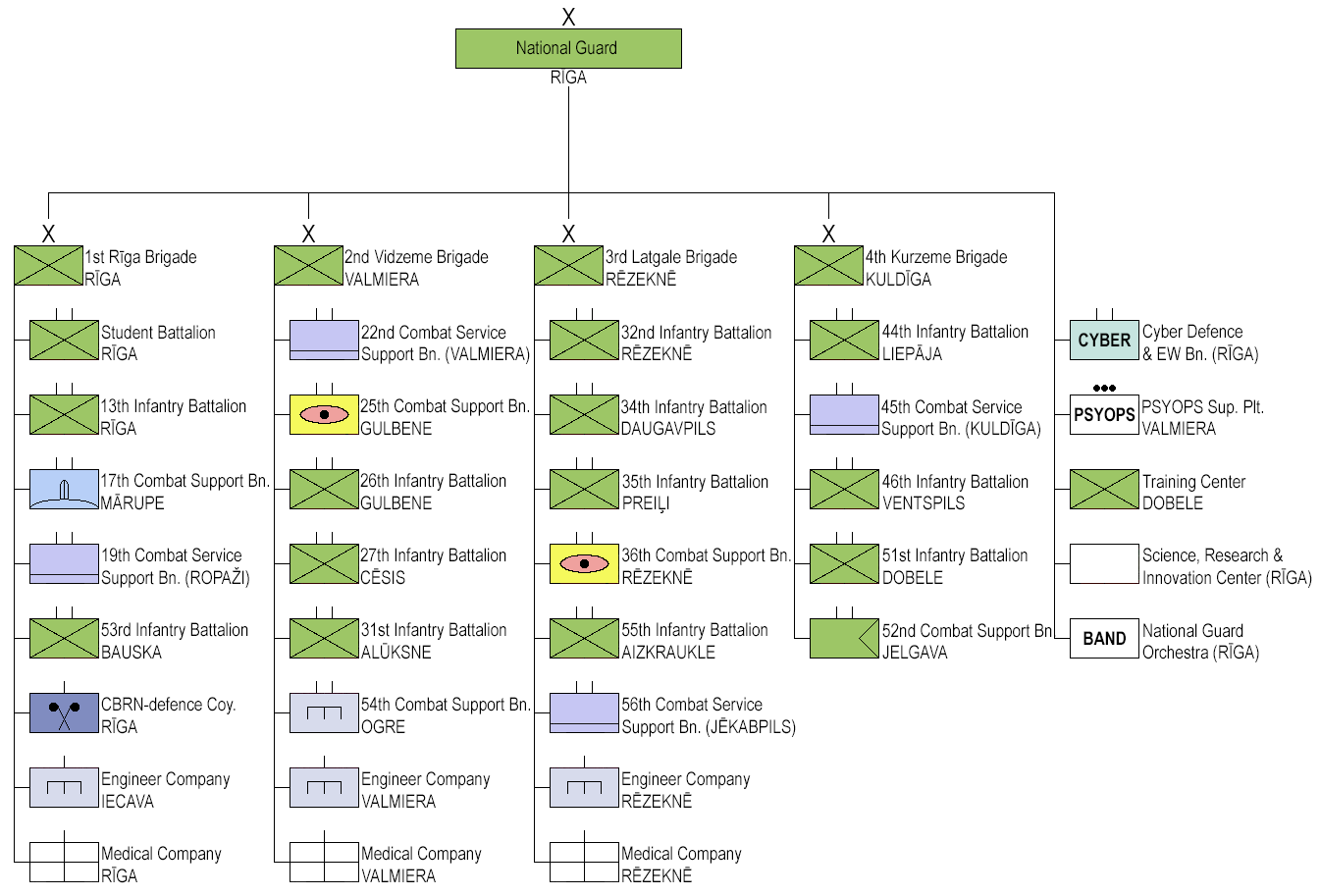
Latvian National Guard organization as of April 2026 (click to enlarge)

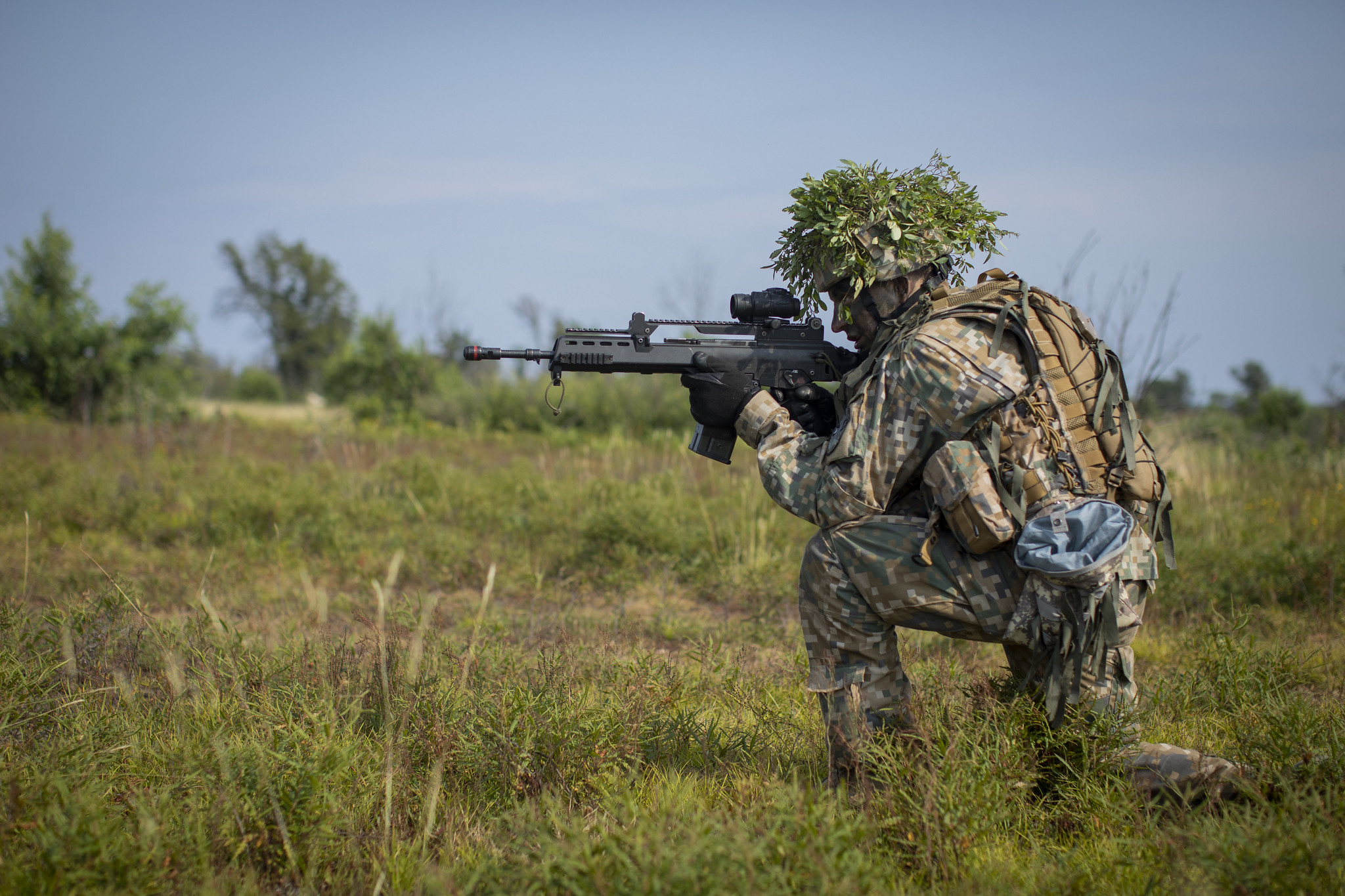
A soldier from the Latvian National Guard's 2nd Brigade, 25th Infantry Battalion at Camp Grayling in Michigan, during Northern Strike 2019.

As of April 2026, the Latvian National Guard consists of the following units:

- National Guard Headquarters, in Riga
  - National Guard Training Center, in Dobele
  - National Guard Cyber Defence and Electronic Warfare Battalion, in Riga
  - National Guard Psychological Operations (PSYOPS) Support Platoon, in Valmiera
  - National Guard Science, Research and Innovation Implementation Center, in Riga
  - National Guard Veterans Association, in Riga
  - National Guard Orchestra, in Riga
  - 1st Rīga Brigade, in Riga (responsible for Riga and the Zemgale region)
    - Student Battalion, in Riga
    - 13th Infantry Battalion, in Riga
    - 17th Combat Support Battalion (Air-defence), in Mārupe (responsible for Jūrmala city, and the Mārupe, Olaine and Ķekava municipalities)
    - 19th Combat Service Support Battalion, in Ropaži (responsible for Ādaži, Salaspils and Ropaži municipalities)
    - 53rd Infantry Battalion, in Bauska (responsible for Bauska Municipality)
    - CBRN-Defence Company, in Riga
    - 1st Rīga Brigade Engineer Company, in Iecava
    - 1st Rīga Brigade Medical Company, in Riga
  - 2nd Vidzeme Brigade, in Valmiera
    - 22nd Combat Service Support Battalion, in Valmiera (responsible for Valmiera, Valka and Smiltene municipalities)
    - 25th Combat Support Battalion (Artillery and Air-defence), in Gulbene
    - 26th Infantry Battalion, in Gulbene (responsible for Gulbene and Madona municipalities)
    - 27th Infantry Battalion, in Cēsis (responsible for Cēsis, Limbaži and Sigulda municipalities, and parts of Saulkrasti Municipality)
    - 31st Infantry Battalion, in Alūksne (responsible for Alūksne and Balvi municipalities)
    - 54th Combat Support Battalion (Engineering), in Ogre (responsible for Ogre Municipality)
    - 2nd Vidzeme Brigade Engineer Company, in Valmiera
    - 2nd Vidzeme Brigade Medical Company, in Valmiera
  - 3rd Latgale Brigade, in Rēzekne
    - 32nd Infantry Battalion, in Rēzekne (responsible for Rēzekne city, and the Rēzekne and Ludza municipalities)
    - 34th Infantry Battalion, in Daugavpils (responsible for Daugavpils city and Augšdaugava Municipality)
    - 35th Infantry Battalion, in Preiļi (responsible for Preiļi, Līvāni and Krāslava municipalities)
    - 36th Combat Support Battalion (Artillery and Air-defence), in Lūznava
    - 55th Infantry Battalion, in Aizkraukle (responsible for Aizkraukle Municipality)
    - 56th Combat Service Support Battalion, in Jēkabpils (responsible for Jēkabpils Municipality)
    - 3rd Latgale Brigade Engineer Company, in Rēzekne
    - 3rd Latgale Brigade Medical Company, in Rēzekne
  - 4th Kurzeme Brigade, in Kuldīga
    - 44th Infantry Battalion, in Liepāja (responsible for Liepāja city and South Kurzeme Municipality)
    - 45th Combat Service Support Battalion, in Kuldīga (responsible for Kuldīga and Saldus municipalities)
    - 46th Infantry Battalion, in Ventspils (responsible for Ventspils city, and the Ventspils and Talsi municipalities)
    - 51st Infantry Battalion, in Dobele (responsible for Dobele and Tukums municipalities)
    - 52nd Combat Support Battalion, in Jelgava (responsible for Jelgava city and Jelgava Municipality)

== Equipment ==
=== Weapons ===
Model	Image	Origin	Type	Caliber	Notes
Pistols
Glock pistol		Austria	Semi-automatic pistol	9×19mm Parabellum	Glock 17 variant.
SIG Sauer P210		Switzerland	Semi-automatic pistol	9×19mm Parabellum	
Submachine guns
Carl Gustaf m/45		Sweden	Submachine gun	9×19mm Parabellum	
Heckler & Koch MP5		Germany	Submachine gun	9×19mm Parabellum	MP5A3 variant.
Rifles
Heckler & Koch G36		Germany	Assault rifle	5.56×45mm NATO	Main service rifle. Has mostly replaced the Ak4, first contract signed in February 2018.
Heckler & Koch G3; Automatkarbin 4 (Ak4)		Germany; Sweden	Battle rifle	7.62×51mm NATO	Ak4 variant, donated from Sweden. Being replaced by G36. Used mostly as a reserve weapon. Replaced Soviet rifles
Sniper rifles
M14 rifle		United States	Battle rifle	7.62×51mm NATO	Large number of rifles were donated by USA after restoration of independence. Modified M-14s used as sniper rifles.
SIG Sauer SSG 3000		Germany	Sniper rifle	7.62×51mm NATO	
Machine guns
RPK		Soviet Union	Light machine gun	7.62×39mm	
Heckler & Koch HK21		Germany	General-purpose machine gun	7.62×51mm NATO	
Rheinmetall MG3		Germany	General-purpose machine gun	7.62×51mm NATO	
FN MAG		Sweden	General-purpose machine gun	7.62×51mm NATO	Kulspruta 58 B variant.
M2 Browning		United States	Heavy machine gun	.50 BMG	
Anti-tank weapons
AT4		Sweden	Recoilless rifle	84 mm	
Carl Gustav		Sweden	Recoilless rifle	84 mm	M2 variant used by the National Guard.
Pvpj 1110		Sweden	Recoilless rifle	90 mm	130 units, some on motorized platforms.
100 mm vz. 53		Czechoslovakia	Field gun	100 mm	23 guns in inventory.
Anti-aircraft weapons
Bofors 40 mm gun		Sweden	Anti-aircraft autocannon	40 mm	24 guns in inventory. Used with CIG-790 fire control system.
Mortars
L16 81mm mortar		United Kingdom; Norway	Mortar	81 mm	28 mortars in inventory.
120-PM-43 mortar		Soviet Union	Mortar	120 mm	25 mortars in inventory. Received from the Czech Republic in 1995.

=== Military vehicles ===
Model	Image	Origin	Type	Quantity	Notes
Armoured personnel carriers
Patria 6×6		Finland Latvia	Armoured personnel carrier	>4	>4 in National Guard inventory. Much more in Latvian Land Forces inventory.
Trucks
Scania 3-series		Sweden	Truck	50	Model P93M. Purchased from Norway between 2014 and 2015.
Mercedes-Benz Unimog		Germany	Truck		Model 416.
Volvo C303		Sweden	Truck		Model Tgb 11, Tgb 13 and Tgb 211A.
Light vehicles
Mercedes-Benz G-Class		Germany	SUV		Model 240GD and 290GD.
Volkswagen Iltis		Germany	SUV		
CUCV		United States	SUV		Model M1008.
Special vehicles
Bv 206		Sweden	Amphibious tracked vehicle		Model Bv 206 and PvBv 2062.
Husky VMMD		United States	Route clearance vehicle	3	Three Husky 2G vehicles provided to the 54th Engineers Battalion by the US in 2019.
PTS		Soviet Union	Amphibious tracked transporter		In reserve in the 54th Engineers Battalion
Artillery
M109A5Ö	Latvian Army M109 A5o Howitzer	United States; Austria	Self-propelled artillery		Listed under Latvian Land Forces inventory, although co-operationally also used by National Guard

== Cooperation ==
The National Guard has established close co-operation with similar organizations abroad – the US Michigan Army National Guard, the Australian Army Reserve, the UK Territorial Army, and the Home Guard organizations of Denmark, Sweden, Norway, Lithuania and Estonia.

== Gallery ==
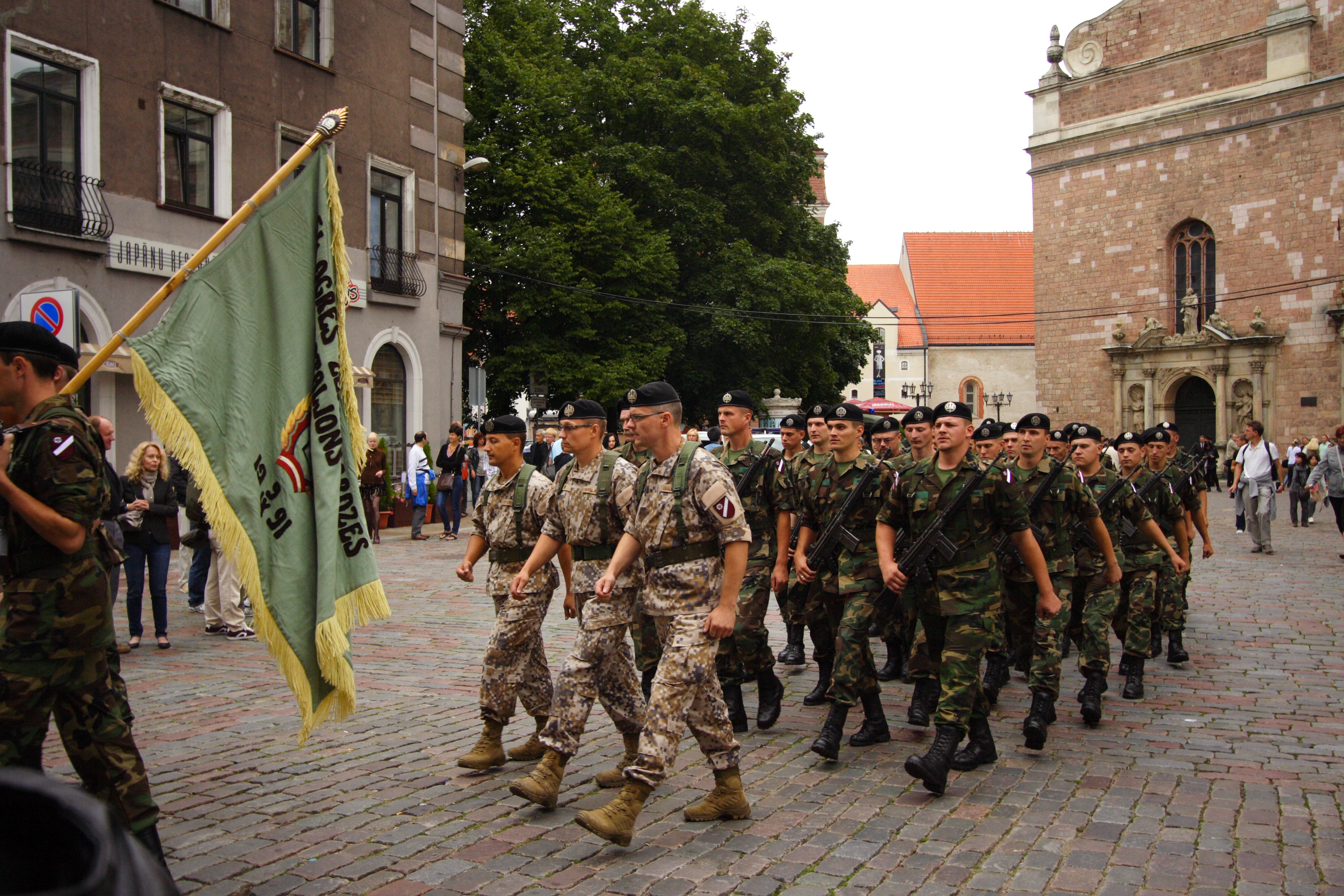
54th Engineer Battalion on parade at the 20th anniversary of the Zemessardze, 2011. Enlisted soldiers are wearing the now-obsolete U.S. Woodland camouflage pattern.

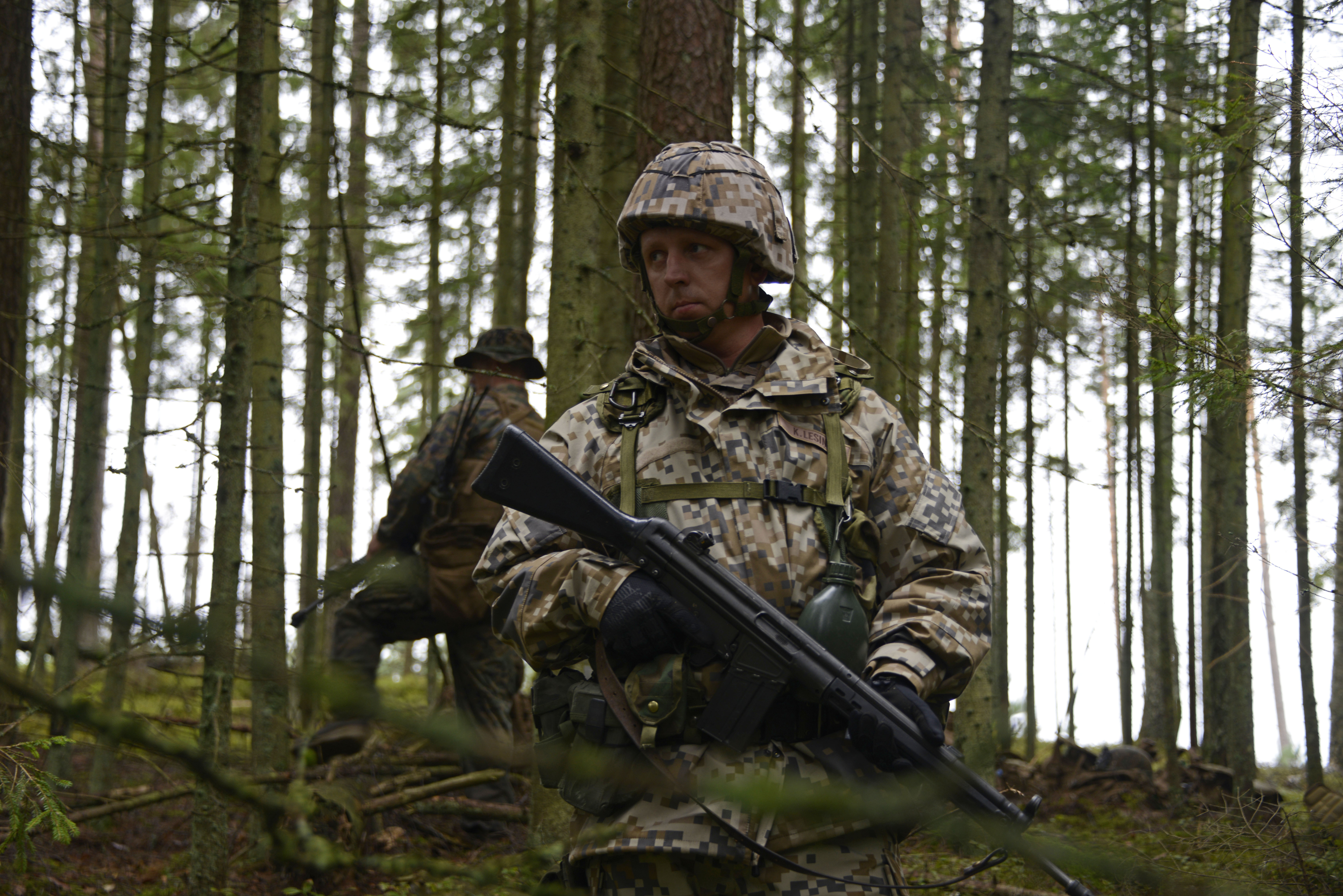
A NG soldier at the Strong Guard 2016 exercise near Tukums, wearing the LATPAT pattern

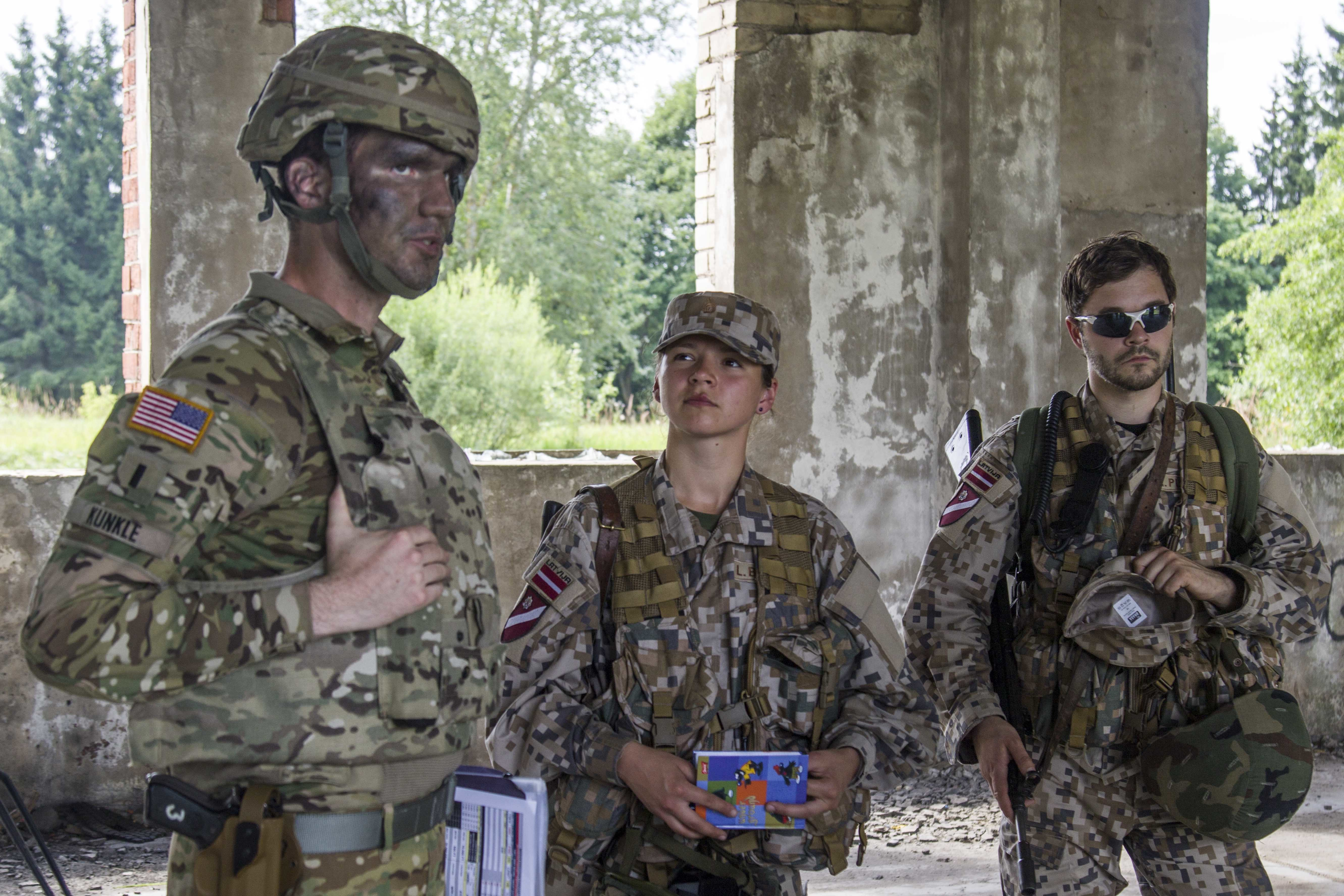
Joint exercise with U.S. Army soldiers in 2017. Woodland, LATPAT and MultiLATPAT (on modular vest) patterns visible.

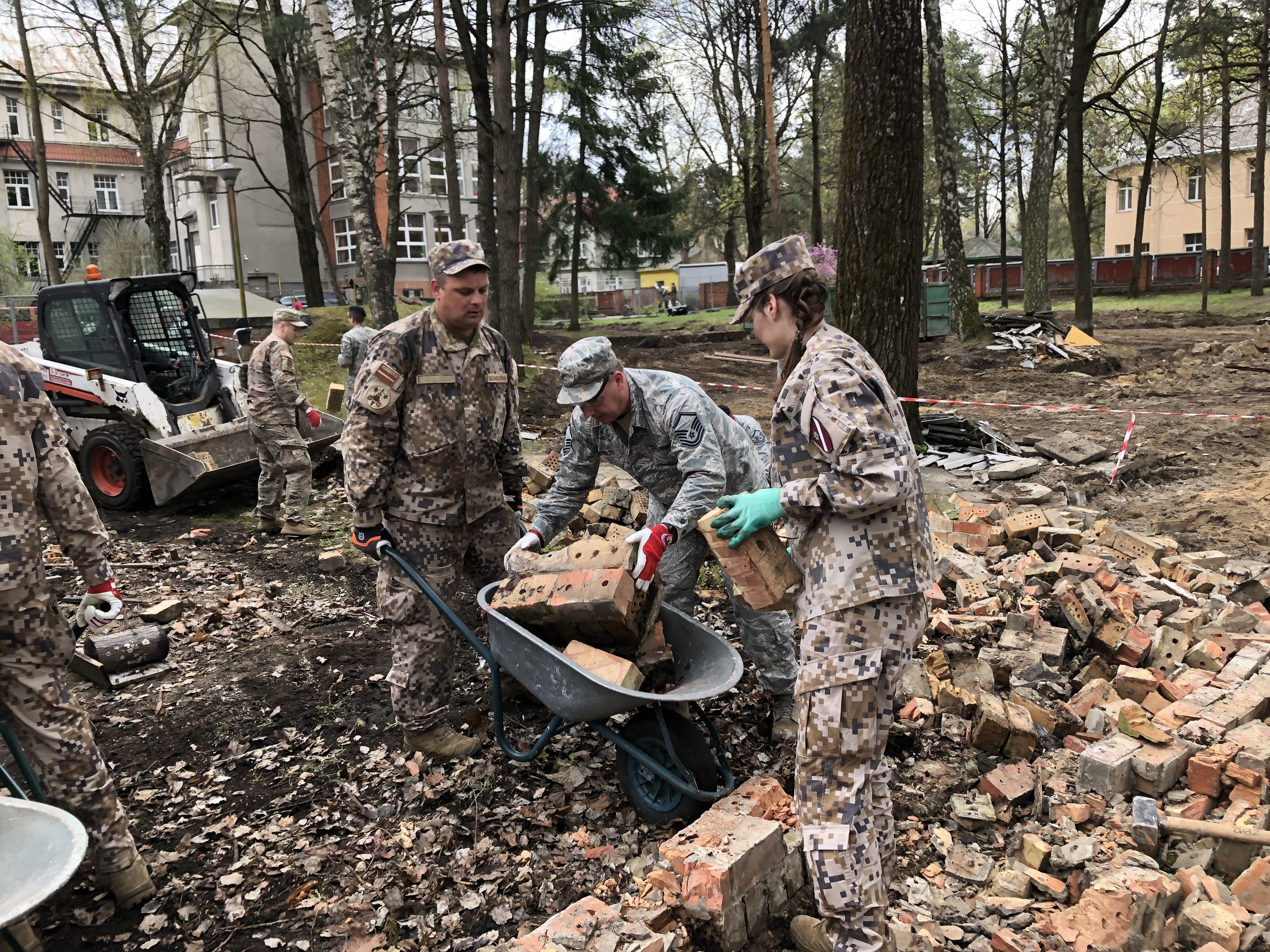
Servicemembers from the NG's Student Battalion and the Michigan National Guard at the National Clean-up Day in 2018

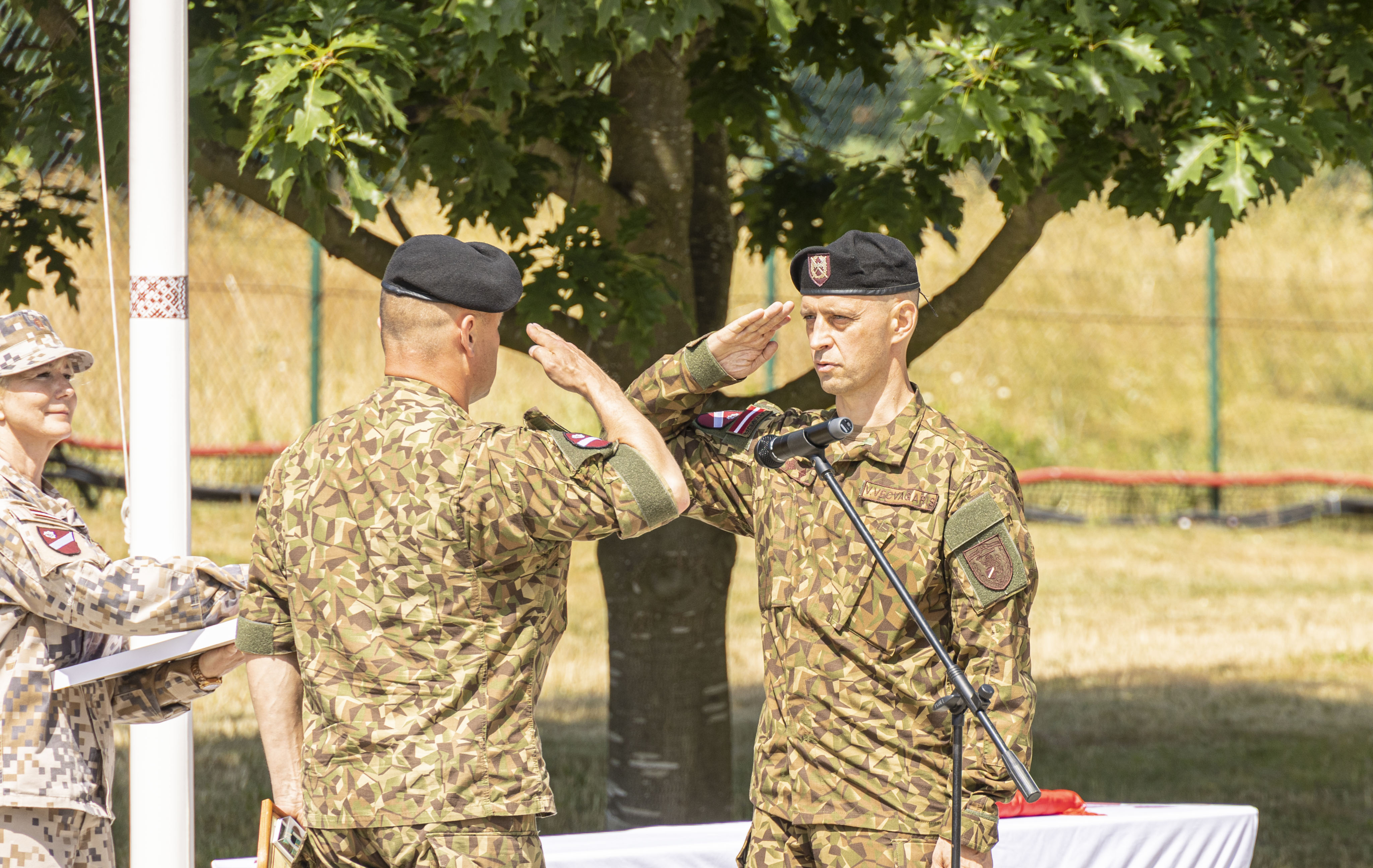
Commanding staff of the 44th Infantry Battalion in 2021, using the current WoodLatPat uniform
