= Latvian National Armed Forces =

Combined military forces of Latvia

- Latvijas Nacionālie bruņotie spēki (Latvian)
- Emblem of the Latvian National Armed Forces
- Motto: Gods kalpot Latvijai! (English: "Honor to serve Latvia!")
- Founded: 10 July 1919; 107 years ago
- Current form: 23 August 1991; 35 years ago
- Service branches: Land Forces; Naval Forces; Air Force; National Guard
- Headquarters: Riga, Latvia
- Website: mil.lv/en

Leadership
- President: Edgars Rinkēvičs
- Prime Minister: Andris Kulbergs
- Minister of Defence: Colonel Raivis Melnis
- Commander of the Joint Headquarters: Major General Kaspars Pudāns

Personnel
- Military age: 18
- Conscription: Yes
- Active personnel: 17 870
- Reserve personnel: 38,000

Expenditure
- Budget: €2.16 billion (2026)
- Percent of GDP: 4.91% (2026)

Related articles
- History: Latvian War of Independence; Latvian national partisans; 2001 War in Afghanistan; Iraq War; Kosovo Force; EUTM Mali; Operation Atalanta; Operation Sophia; MINUSMA; Operation Inherent Resolve; Resolute Support Mission
- Ranks: Military ranks of Latvia

The Latvian National Armed Forces (Latvian: Latvijas Nacionālie bruņotie spēki; NBS), are the armed forces of Latvia. Latvia's defense concept is based on a mobile, professional rapid response force and a reserve segment that can be called upon relatively fast for mobilization should the need arise. The National Armed Forces consists of Land Forces, Naval Forces, Air Force and National Guard. Its main tasks are to protect the territory of the State; participate in international military operations; and to prevent threats to national security.

== Mission ==
The mission of the National Armed Forces (NBS) is to defend the sovereignty and territorial integrity of the nation and to defend its population against foreign or domestic armed aggression. In order to implement these tasks, the NBS provides for the defense of the nation, its airspace, and national territorial waters; participates in large scale crisis response operations; performs emergency rescue operations; and participate in international peacekeeping operations.

The main mission of the National Armed Forces is to:

- Provide for the inviolability of all national territory, its waters, and air space;
- Participate in international operations;
- Participate in national threat elimination;
- Provide for the training of personnel and military reserves;
- Ensure modernization and enhancement of professional combat training.

== History ==
=== War of Independence, peacetime (1919–1940) ===
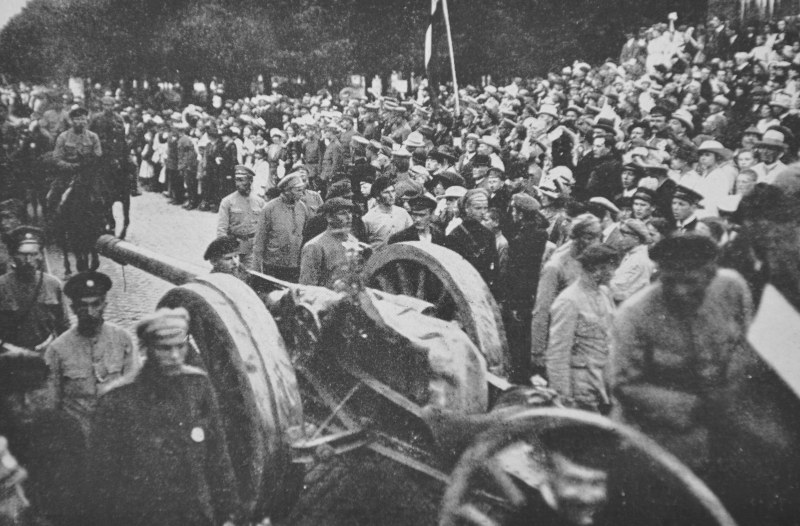
The North Latvian Brigade in mid-1919

The Latvian armed forces were first formed soon after the new state was proclaimed in November 1918 after World War I, with the official founding of the Latvian Armed Forces (Latvian: Latvijas Bruņotie spēki) on 10 July 1919, when the North Latvian and South Latvian Brigade, which were loyal to the Latvian Provisional Government, were merged. Seasoned general Dāvids Sīmansons was appointed as the first Commander-in-Chief. At the end of the Latvian War of Independence, the Latvian Army consisted of 69,232 men.

In terms of equipment, the Latvian military during its first independence period (1919–1940) was armed mostly with British weapons and gear. The average Latvian infantry soldier in the 1930s is believed to have carried 31,4 kg of equipment in the winter months, and around 29,1 kg in the summer. The main service rifle was the British Pattern 1914 Enfield, and the amount of standard issue ammunition for an infantry soldier was 45 rounds of .303 (7.7 mm) caliber. In addition, troops had access to three different types of hand grenades (defense, attack, and rifle grenades). The Latvian Army had acquired a wide variety of machine guns in different calibers, through various means: trophies acquired from hostile forces during the War of Independence, allied donations and subsequent official state purchases. Light machine guns included the French Chauchat, Danish Madsen, and British Lewis gun (which became the main light machine gun of the Latvian Army). The main heavy machine gun was the British Vickers machine gun in the .303 (7.7 mm) caliber, although the army also kept Russian PM M1910 machine guns in reserve. In general, the Latvian Army lacked automatic weapons of all calibers, and the ones it did have were becoming increasingly outdated towards the start of World War II (most of the weapons in service were from World War I). In terms of heavy weapons, the Latvian military had acquired a rather large number of different artillery systems in different calibers, around 400 artillery pieces in total (although most of these were outdated and worn out due to heavy use and age). The main artillery guns for infantry support were the British Ordnance QF 18-pounder field gun and British QF 4.5-inch howitzer, although there were also several types of French, German, and Russian artillery guns in reserve. For anti-tank weapons, in 1938 the army received the Austrian 47 mm Cannone da 47/32 anti-tank cannons, which were reasonably effective against early World War II tanks. For infantry mortars, a number of 81mm mortars were acquired from Finland some time around the late 1930s, but it is unclear how many were delivered and in service at the start of World War II. In terms of individual equipment, the standard helmets were surplus M1916/18 Stahlhelms or Adrian helmets.

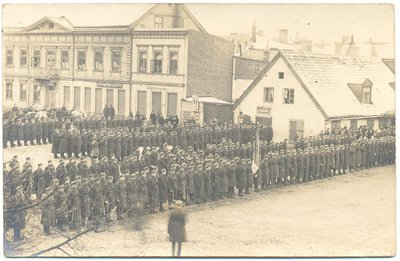
Latvian soldiers in Liepāja in November 1920

In terms of vehicles, the Latvian military was seriously lacking in motorized transport, and thus had to rely mostly on railroads and horse-drawn carriages for most of its logistics needs. The military leadership did make an effort to solve this problem at the end of the 1930s by purchasing a small number of cars, trucks, artillery tractors, and motorbikes, but at the start of World War II, only a small portion of the Latvian military had access to motorized vehicles. In terms of armoured vehicles, the Latvian military had six armoured trains, a Carden Loyd tankette, seven armoured cars and 24 tanks of various designs and combat abilities. In terms of air power, at the start of World War II the Latvian Air Force had around 30 fighter planes and 24 scout planes, of which only some were the relatively modern Gloster Gladiator fighters, 24 training and 6 seaplanes. Thus, the Latvian military during the interwar era was more or less comparable both in equipment and size to its other Baltic neighbours, such as Estonia, Lithuania and Finland. The Armed Forces were also supported by the volunteer Aizsargi Organization.

=== World War II and the occupation of the Baltic states (1939–1991) ===
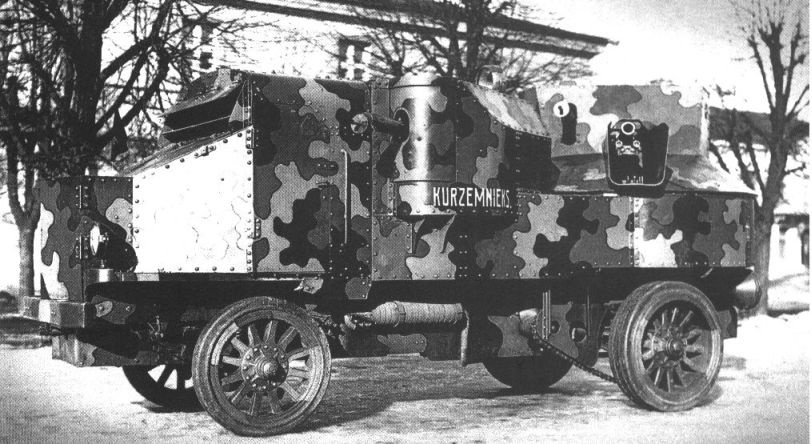
Latvian Army Garford-Putilov armored car "Kurzemnieks", 1920s

However, the most crucial problem and flaw for both the Latvian military and other militaries of the Baltic states on the eve of World War II had to do with the failure to organize effective military cooperation between all the Baltic states in case of a new war in the region. The Latvian command in the interwar period had given very little attention towards any possible coordination of forces with either the Estonian or Lithuanian armies against a possible enemy, and so the Latvian military planned its actions and doctrine in almost complete isolation, oblivious to whatever its neighbours to the north (Estonia) or south (Lithuania) did. This ultimately led to flawed and questionable choices in creating defense plans against both Nazi Germany and the Soviet Union (there were separate plans towards both of these possible aggressors), since the Latvian higher command was unsure as to how Latvia's neighbours would react in the event such a conflict started.

After the Soviet occupation of Latvia in June 1940, during which the armed forces did not intervene following orders, the annihilation of the Latvian Army began. The army was first renamed the People's Army of Latvia (Latvian: Latvijas Tautas armija) and, in September–November 1940 – the Red Army's 24th Territorial Rifle Corps. The corps comprised the 181st and 183rd Rifle Divisions. In September the corps contained 24,416 men but in autumn more than 800 officers and about 10,000 instructors and soldiers were discharged. The arrests of soldiers continued in the following months. In June 1940, the entire Territorial Corps was sent to Litene camp. Before leaving the camp, Latvians drafted in 1939 were demobilised, and replaced by about 4,000 Russian soldiers from the area around Moscow. On June 10, the corps' senior officers were sent to Russia where they were arrested and most of them shot. On June 14 at least 430 officers were arrested and sent to Gulag camps. After the German attack against the Soviet Union, from June 29 to July 1 more than 1980 Latvian soldiers were demobilised, fearing that they might turn their weapons against the Russian commissars and officers. Simultaneously, many soldiers and officers deserted, and when the corps crossed the Latvian border into the Russian SFSR, only about 3,000 Latvian soldiers remained. During and after World War II, many former veterans were a part of the fighters of the anti-Soviet National Partisan resistance movement opposing the continued Soviet occupation.

=== After restoration of independence (1991–present) ===
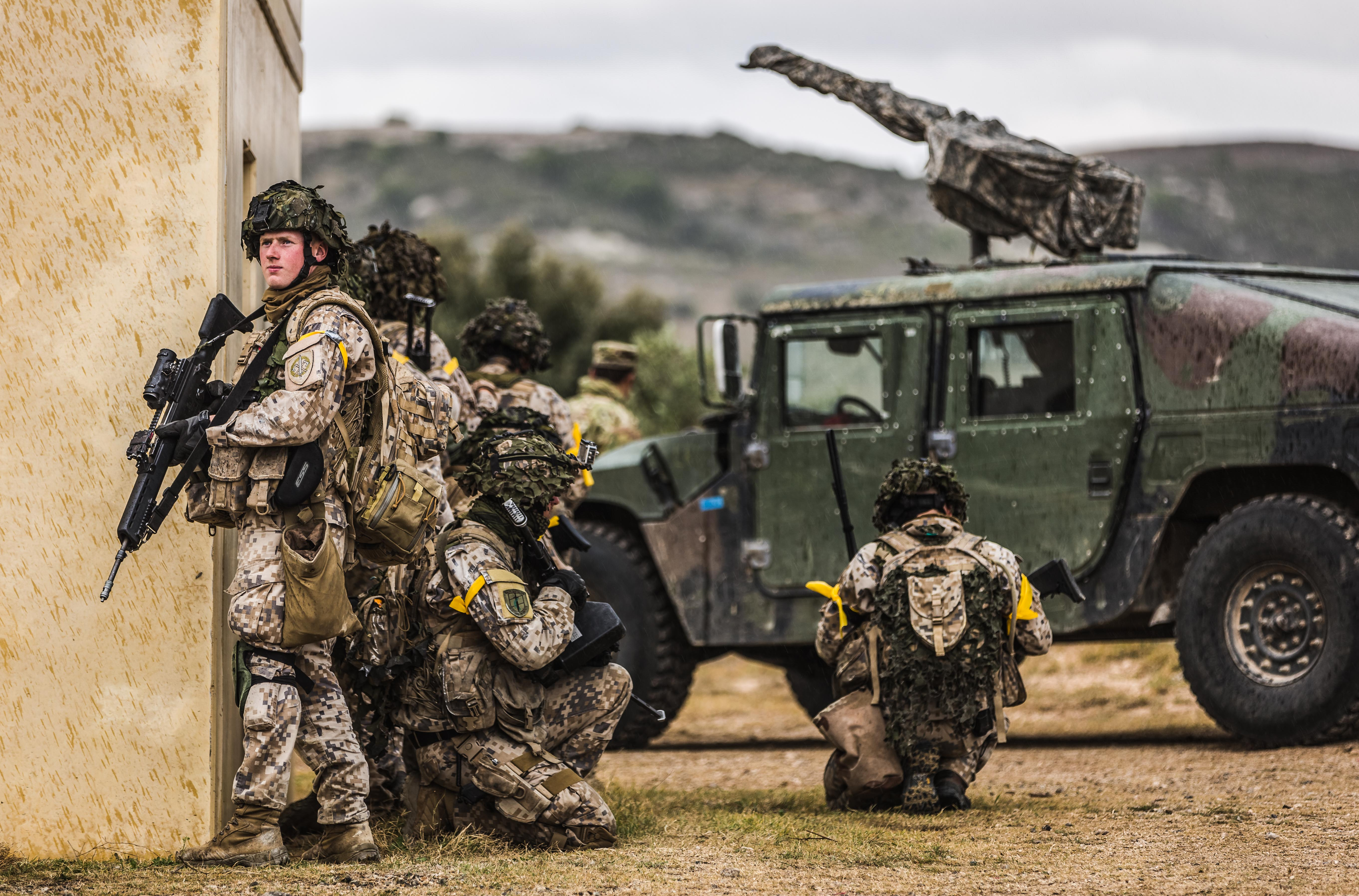
Latvian soldiers during the NATO exercise "Trident Juncture 2015"

The origin of the current Latvian armed forces can be traced to the establishment of the Latvian National Guard, or Zemessardze on 23 August 1991, which served as the first organized defence force after the restoration of the independence of Latvia. Unlike other Soviet republics, it is one of the military forces in the Baltic states that were not formed from the Baltic Military District. From the beginning, the reconstituted defense forces were modeled according to NATO standards with assistance from the United States, the United Kingdom, Sweden etc.

A notable moment in the history of the armed forces is the accession to the North Atlantic Treaty Organization on 29 March 2004, after Latvia received a Membership Action Plan in 1999 and, ultimately, an invite was extended to it and six other countries during the 2002 Prague summit. Previously, Latvia co-founded the North Atlantic Cooperation Council in 1991 and joined the Partnership for Peace program in 1994.

Since the 1990s, personnel of the NBS has been deployed to a number of peacekeeping, training, and support missions—the NATO Stabilisation Force in Bosnia and Herzegovina (SFOR) from 1996 to 2004; the Kosovo Force (KFOR) from 2000 to 2009; the NATO training mission in Iraq (NTM-I) from 2005 to 2006, the NATO International Security Assistance Force (ISAF) from 2003 to 2015; the Resolute Support Mission from 2015 to 2021 and others.

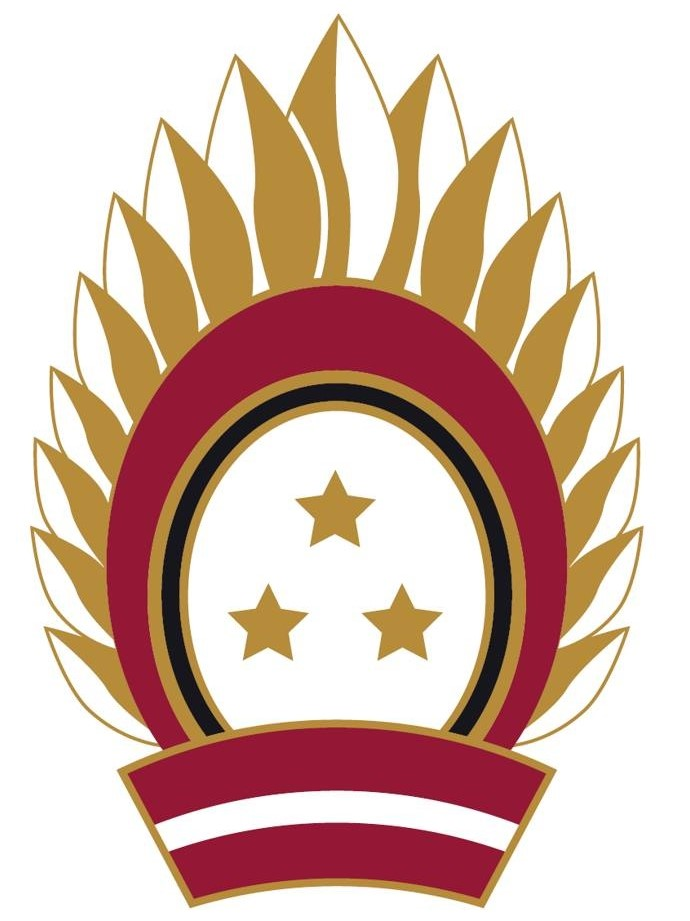
Cap badge of the field uniform

In 2007, Latvia abolished conscription, switching to a professional, volunteer-based service model. However, after the start of the Russo-Ukrainian War in 2014, calls for reintroducing mandatory military service reappeared, with the full invasion of Ukraine by Russia in 2022 being a decisive boost to this momentum, despite initial skepticism from the top leadership in the NBS and the Ministry of Defence. In July 2022, Defence Minister Artis Pabriks announced a plan for the reintroduction of military service – officially called the National Defense Service (Latvian: Valsts aizsardzības dienests, VAD) – first on a voluntary basis and then in compulsory form at a later date for physically and mentally capable males aged 18–27, starting from January 2023. The Government of Latvia supported the plan in September, with the next required step being the approval of the Saeima. The Cabinet also supported the proposed transitional period from 2023 to 2028, where the length of the service would be 10 months and that service can be postponed until 26 years of age. Alternative service options would involve serving in a National Guard unit on a part-time basis for 5 years; civil service, or special military courses for students.

== Organization ==
Latvian military units and bases

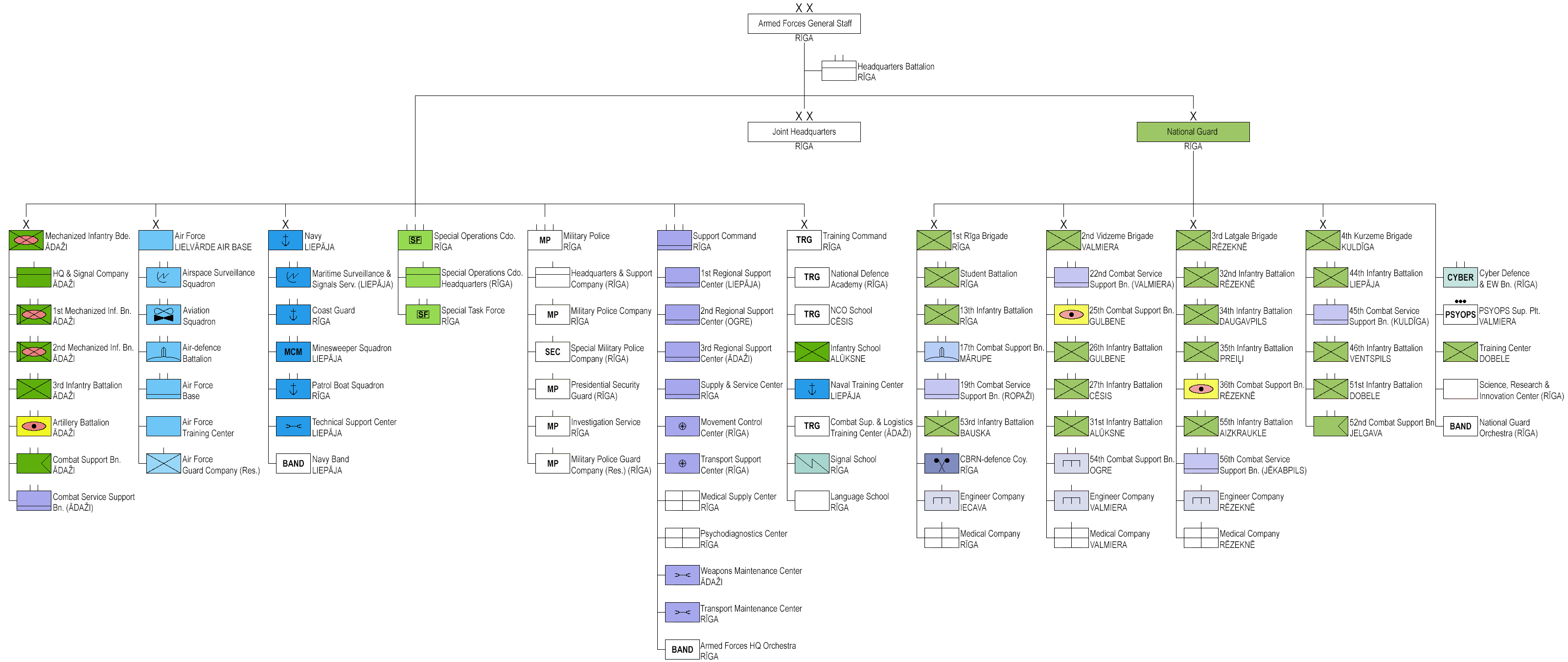
Latvian Armed Forces organization as of April 2026 (click to enlarge)

The National Armed Forces consist of:

- Armed Forces Staff Battalion
  - Headquarters and Services Company
  - Honor Guard Company
  - Signals Company
  - Communications and Information Systems Support Center
  - Medical Platoon
- Armed Forces Joint Headquarters
- Land Forces
- Air Force
- Navy
- Special Operations Command
- National Guard
- Military Police
- Training Command
- Support Command

== Personnel ==
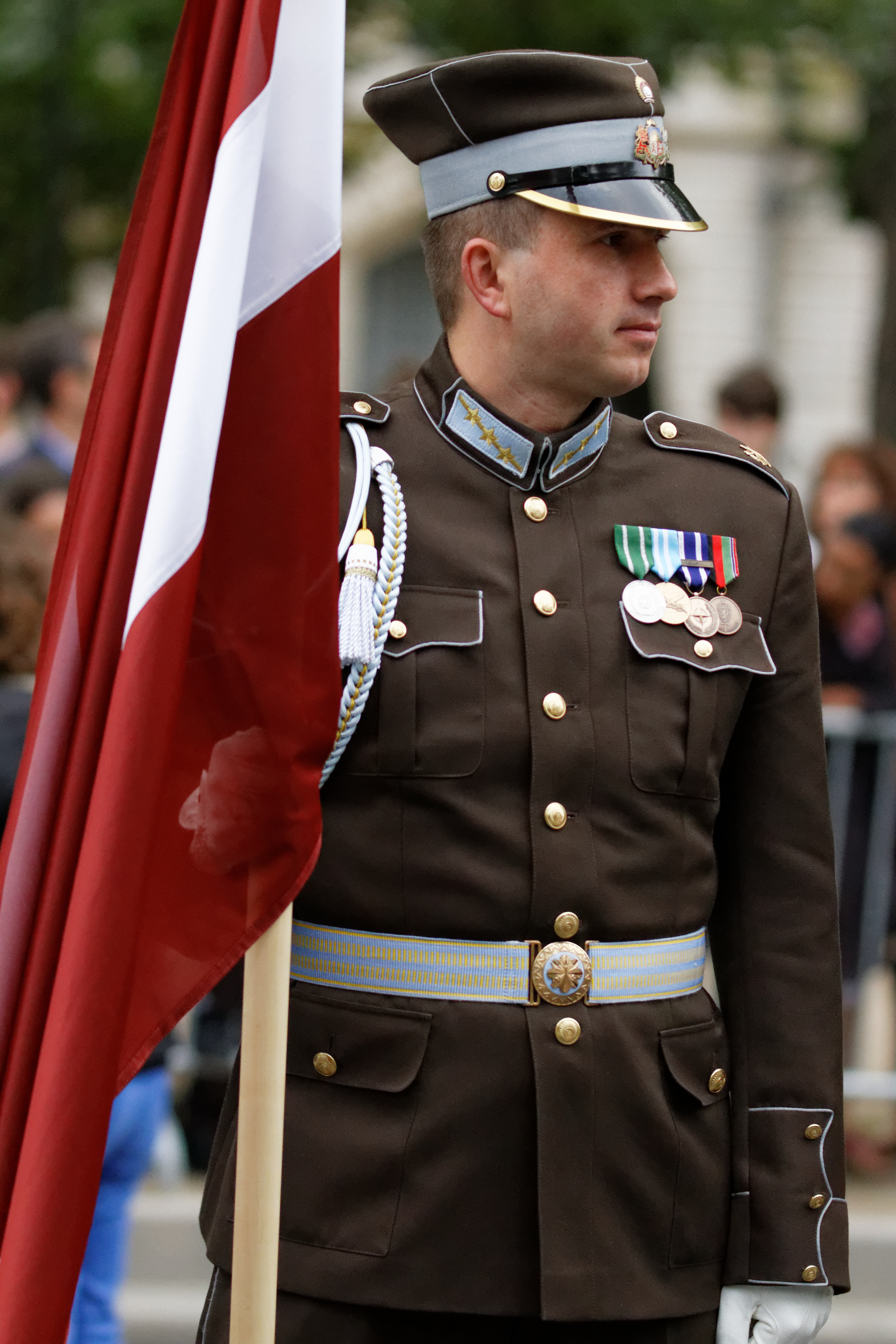
Latvian Army Staff Battalion color guard at Bastille Day military parade, 2014

Latvian National Armed Forces consist of the Regular Force, National Guard and Reserve. On 1 January 2007, conscription was abolished and since then the Regular Force consists of only professional soldiers. Recruits must be 18 years of age or older. As of June 2018, there were 5500 active duty soldiers, 8000 national guards. By the end of 2017, there were 7900 registered reserve soldiers, of whom about 5000 were retired professional soldiers. According to the National Defence Concept, the National Armed Forces are to maintain 25000 militarily trained personnel, including 6500 professional soldiers, 8005 National Guards and 3010 (trained) reserve soldiers. Reserve training began in 2015.

As of July 2025, NBS continues to expand its personnel.

=== Conscription ===
On 5 April 2023, Latvia decided to reintroduce compulsory national defense service in response to the ongoing Russian invasion in Ukraine. Conscripted personnel will have to serve in the Latvian National Armed Forces for at least 11 months. The law foresees two types of service: military and alternative (civil service). Males born after 1 January 2004, are subject to mandatory service, while males and females aged 18 to 27 can apply voluntarily. The law exempts certain individuals, including those whose health status does not comply with service requirements, sole guardians of children, sole caretakers of dependents, and those who have served in a different country if they have dual citizenship. In the first two rounds of conscription, Latvian military had enough volunteers and didn't need to resort to random selection. On 27 August 2024, Latvian defense minister Andris Sprūds initiated the discussion on conscription of women by 2028.

== Operations ==
=== International cooperation ===
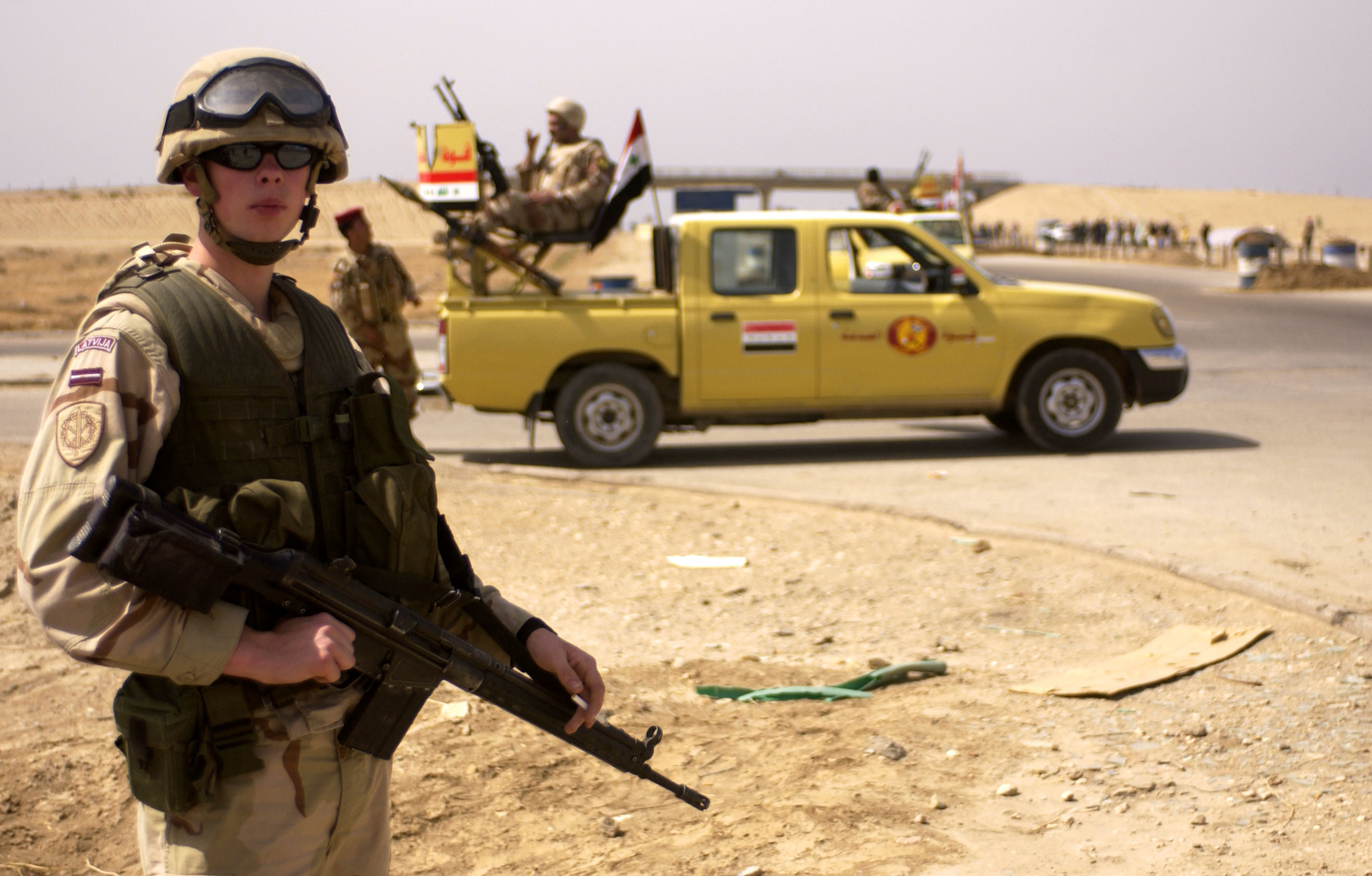
Latvian Army 2nd battalion soldier in Iraq, 2006

Along with providing for national defence, the NBS will also react immediately to threats to other allies and to international crises.

Latvia cooperates with Estonia and Lithuania in the infantry battalion BALTBAT and naval squadron BALTRON which are available for peacekeeping operations.

Currently, NATO is involved in the patrolling and protection of the Latvian air space as the Latvian military does not have the means to do so. For this goal a rotating force of four NATO fighters, which comes from different nations and switches at two or three month intervals, is based in Lithuania to cover all three Baltic states (see Baltic Air Policing).

After the Russian invasion of Ukraine, the Baltic states of Estonia, Latvia and Lithuania have decided to construct a Baltic Defence Line on their eastern border with Russia and Belarus.

=== Current international operations ===
Information as of December 2024.

Deployment Country	Organization	Operation	Personnel
Latvia	EU	EUMAM UA
Saudi Arabia	EU	EUNAVFOR Aspides
Italy	EU	EUNAVFOR MED IRINI
Israel	UN	UNTSO
Lebanon	UN	UNIFIL
Kosovo	NATO	KFOR
Iraq	NATO	NATO Mission Iraq NMI
Iraq	CJTF	Operation Inherent Resolve

== Modernization ==
After joining NATO, the foundation of the Latvian defence system has shifted from total territorial defence to collective defence. Latvia has acquired small but highly professional troop units that have been fully integrated into NATO structures. NBS soldiers have participated in international operations since 1996. Specialized units (e.g. units of military medics, military police, unexploded ordnance neutralizers, military divers and special forces) have been established in order to facilitate and enhance NBS participation in international operations. Special attention has been paid to establishing a unit to deal with the identification and clearance of nuclear pollution.

== List of military equipment ==
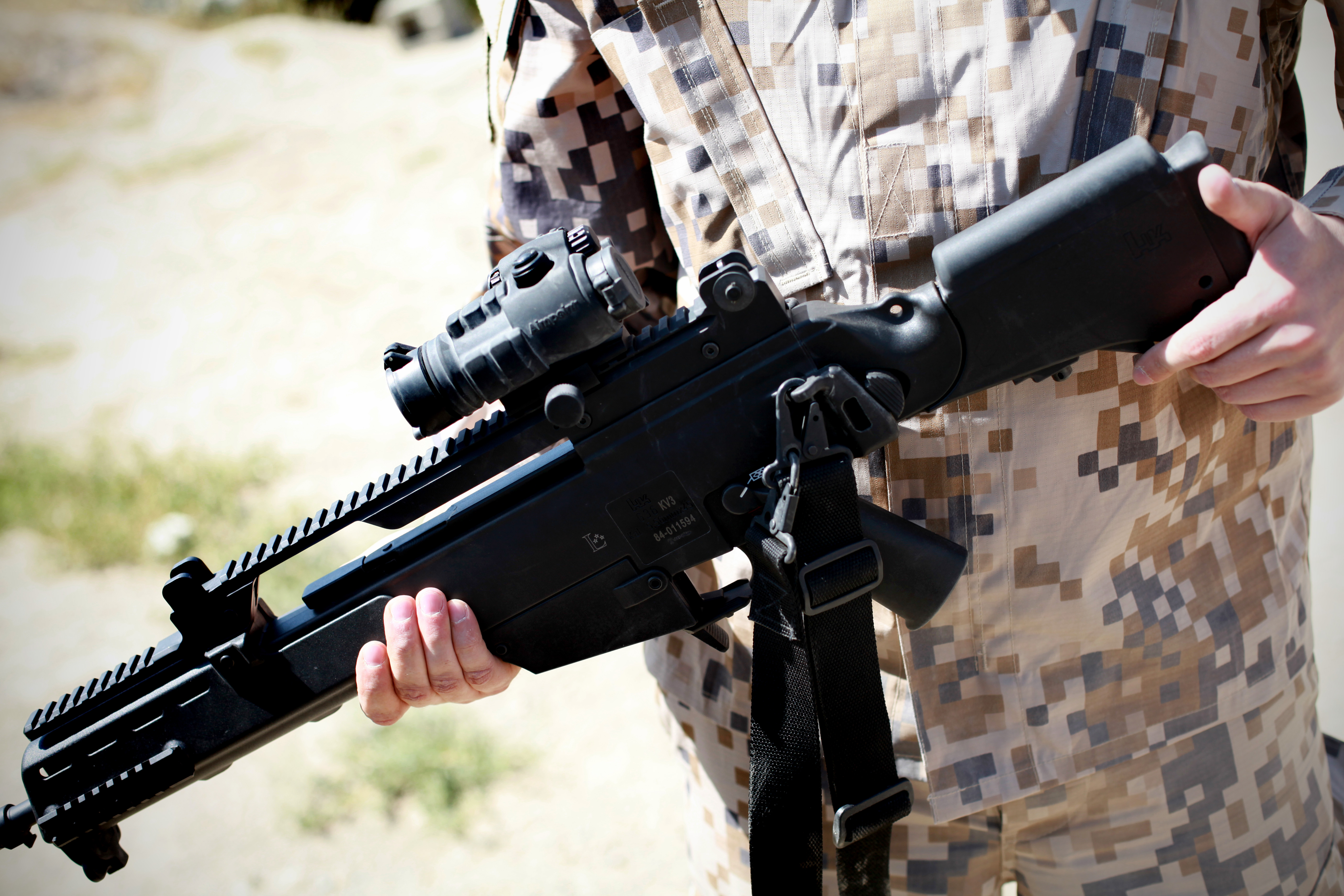
Heckler & Koch G36

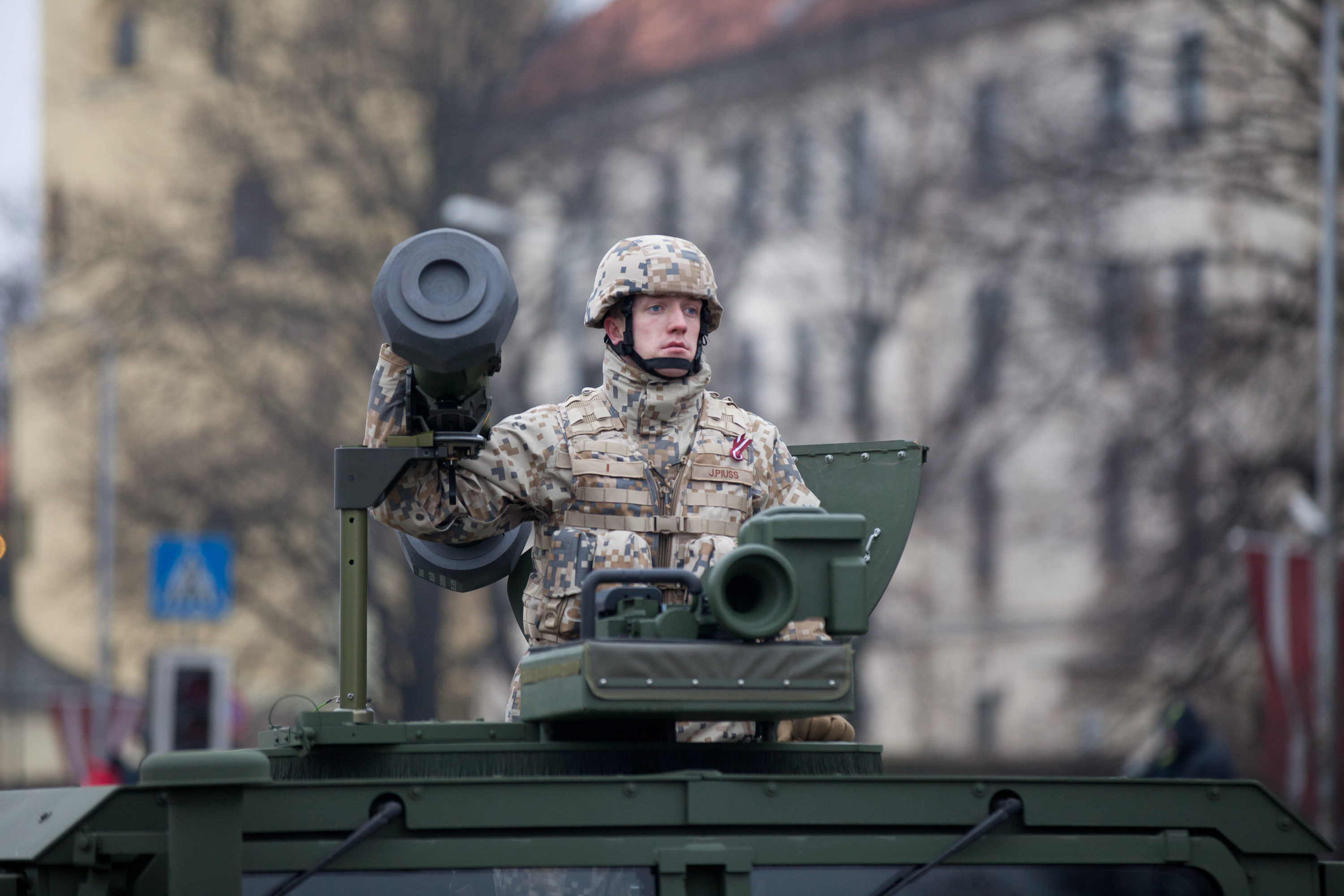
Spike ATGM

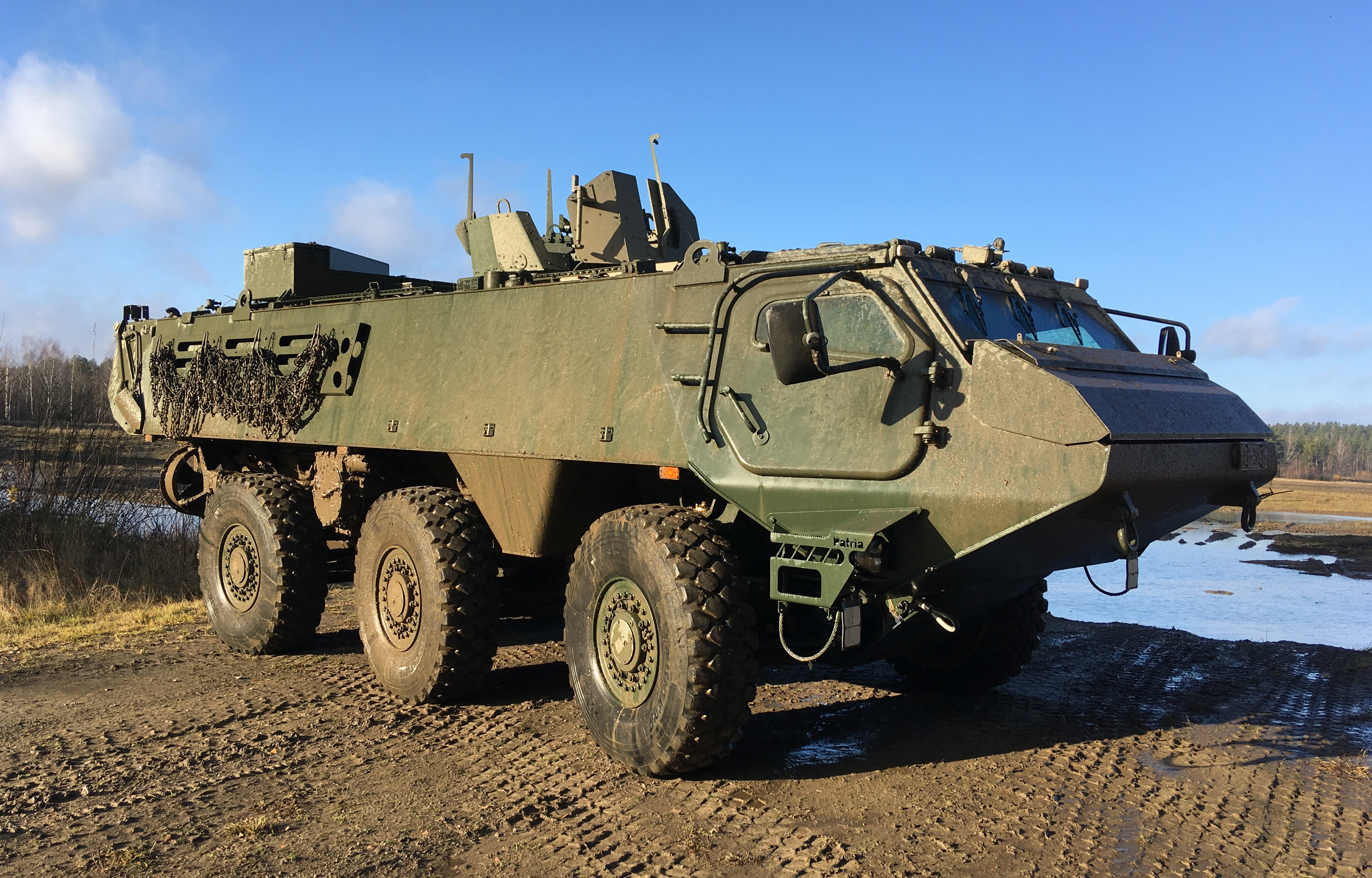
Patria 6×6

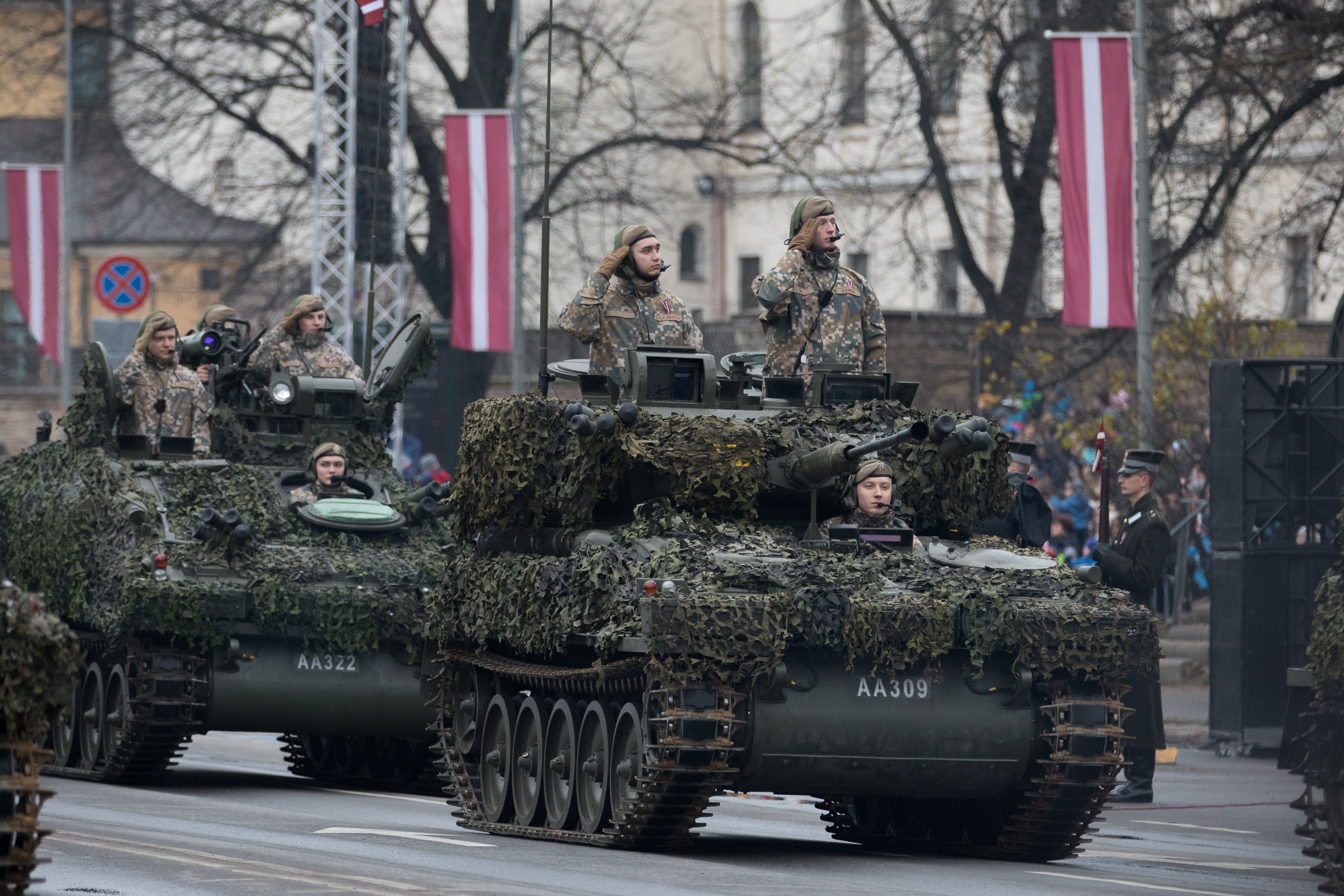
CVR(T)

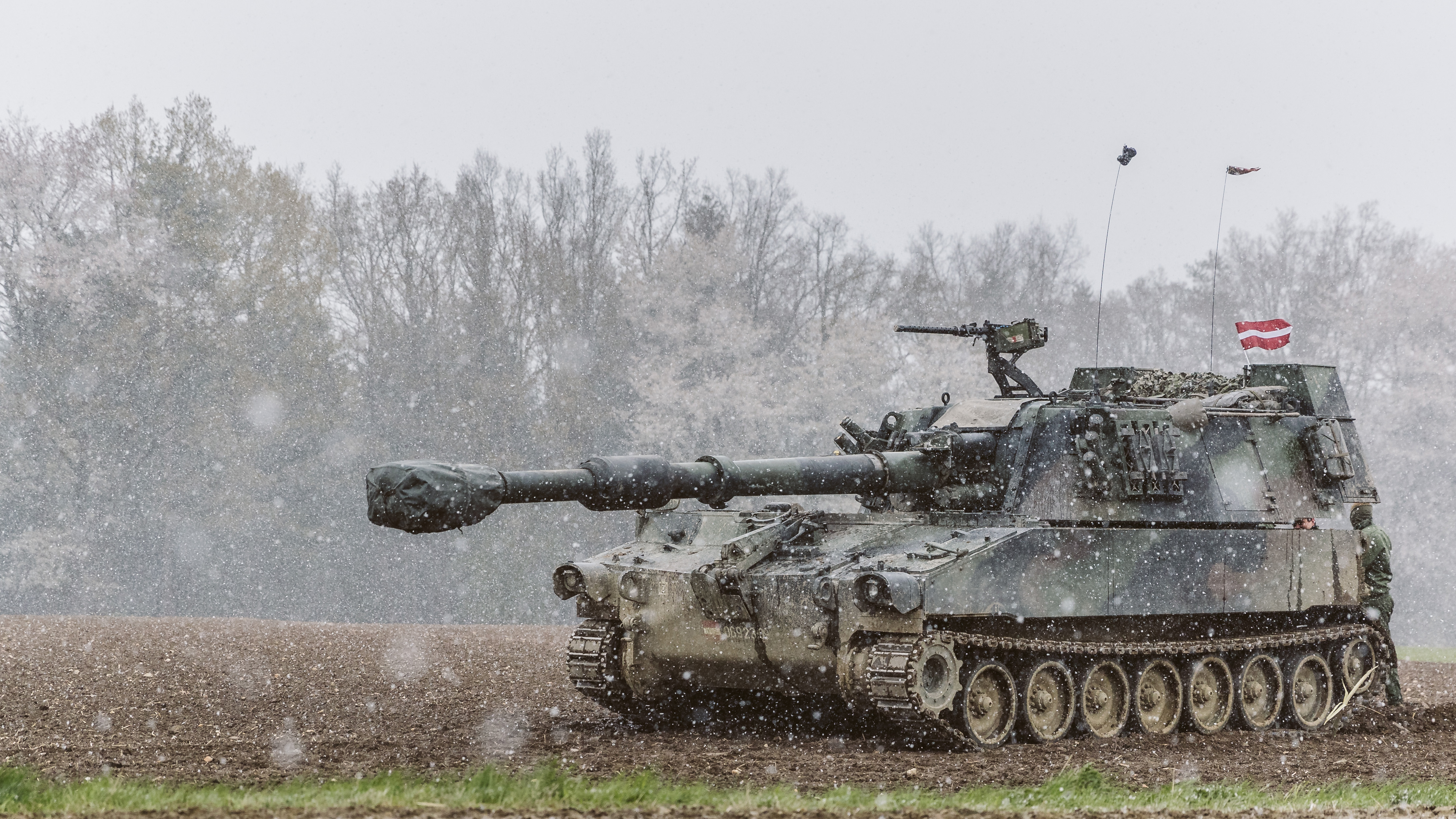
M109 howitzer

== Military industry ==
Latvia's military industry is quite small, with Military Balance 2025 from IISS describing it as: "Latvia has a niche defence-industrial capability".

Latvia has developed its military industrial capabilities since the Russian invasion of Ukraine. Latvia has established a National Defence Corporation (Latvian: SIA “Valsts aizsardzības korporācija”, VAK) for military industrial purposes. Latvia has one small-arms ammunition maker (Ammunity) and has made an agreement with Rheinmetall about developing a 155 mm artillery ammunition plant. Latvia also intends to start artillery charge (gunpowder) production, with the construction of the artillery propellant charge production factory beginning in January 2026. Latvia also plans to build an anti-tank mine production factory in co-operation with Dynamit Nobel Defence. A military explosive factory by the company Wolfram Europa is being considered in Latvia. Latvia also has partnered with Patria in both producing armored fighting vehicles (Patria 6x6, assembly of ASCOD 2) in Latvia and in maintaining military vehicles in Latvia. Latvia has also launched an indigenous production of military ATVs (VR FOX). Latvia has also developed drone and defence electronics industry. For example, a company in Latvia produces night vision goggles. A Latvian company has developed a military electric scooter. A Latvian company has developed an unmanned ground vehicle (UGV) Natrix.
