= List of international presidential trips made by Sauli Niinistö =

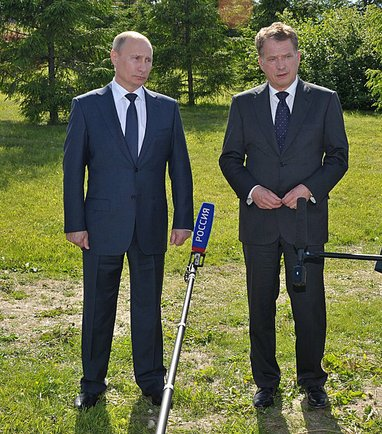
Vladimir Putin and Sauli Niinistö in the Leningrad Oblast. June 2012.

The following is a list of presidential trips made by Sauli Niinistö during his tenure as the 12th President of Finland, which began on 1 March 2012 and ended on 1 March 2024. During this time he travelled abroad 151 times.

This information was gathered mainly from the official site of the president, more specifically from his calendar and pages linked there, although some of his trips are missing there, and his press releases from the same site.

== First term of office ==
Niinistö's first term of six years began on 1 March 2012 and ended on 1 February 2018.

=== 2012 ===
- 12 trips abroad, of which two were state visits.

Finnish President Sauli Niinistö's presidential visits in 2012
No.	Date	Country	Location	Host	Reason for visit	References
1	26–27 March	(South Korea) Republic of Korea	Seoul	Lee Myung-bak, President of South Korea	Nuclear Security Summit	
2	17–18 April	Sweden	Stockholm	Carl XVI Gustaf, King	State visit	
3	25 April	Estonia	Tallinn	Toomas Hendrik Ilves, President of Estonia	Official visit	
4	20–21 May	United States	Chicago	Anders Fogh Rasmussen, Secretary General of NATO	NATO 2012 summit	
5	22 May	Sweden	Stockholm	Carl XVI Gustaf, King of Sweden	Baptism of Princess Estelle	
6	21–22 June	Russia	Saint Petersburg	Vladimir Putin, President of Russia	Working visit, St. Petersburg International Economic Forum	
7	27–31 July	United Kingdom	London		2012 Summer Olympics	
8	2–4 September	United Kingdom	London		2012 Summer Paralympics	
9	4–5 September	Hungary	Budapest	János Áder, President of Hungary	Working visit	
10	22–29 September	United States	New York	Kofi Annan, UN General Secretary	Opening of United Nations General Assembly; Meeting with US President Barack Obama	
11	10–11 October	Norway	Oslo	Harald V, King	State visit	
12	8–9 November	Germany	Berlin	Joachim Gauck, Bundespräsident	Official visit	

=== 2013 ===
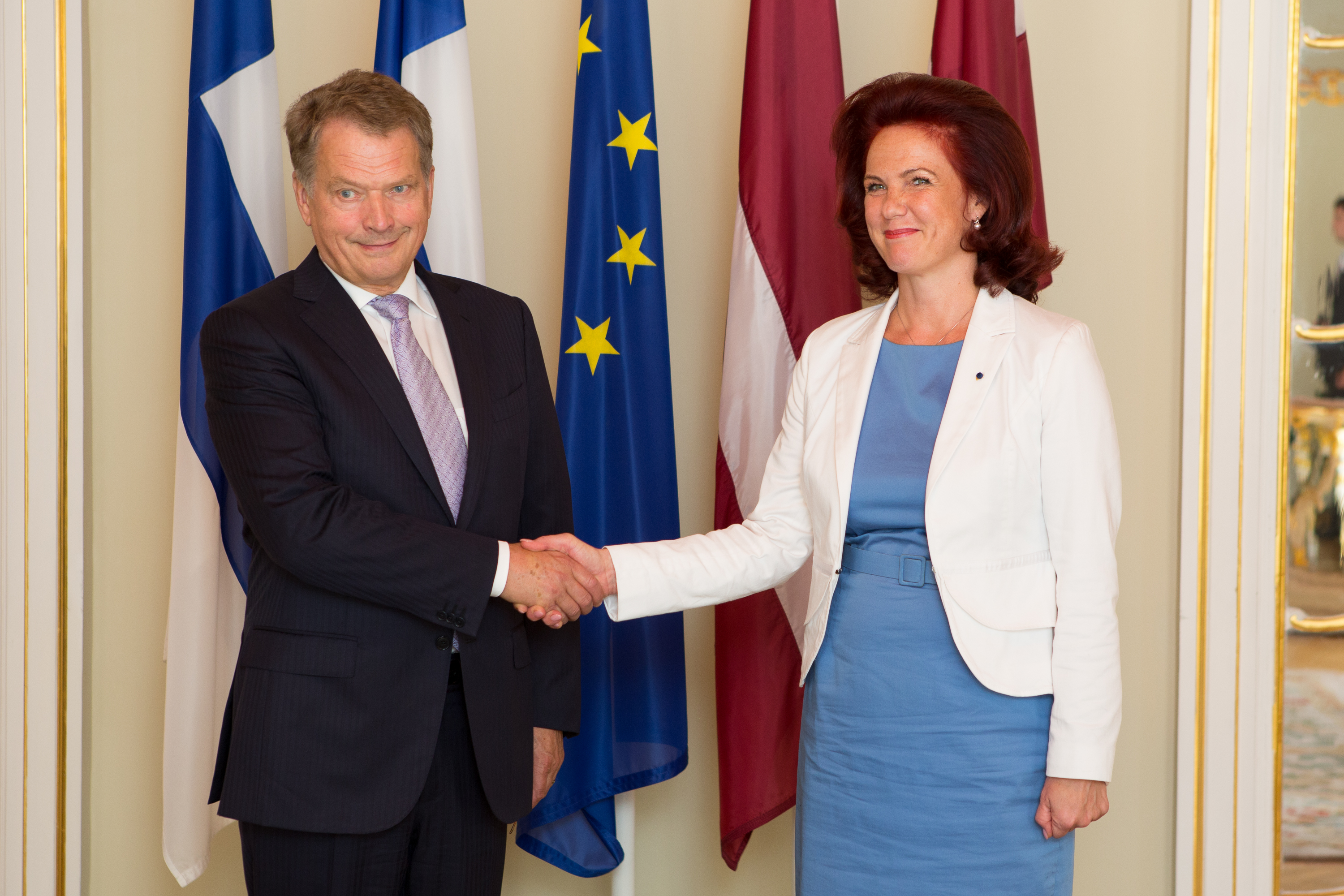
Sauli Niinistö with Solvita Āboltiņa

- 16 trips abroad, of which six were state visits.

Finnish President Sauli Niinistö's presidential visits in 2013
No.	Date	Country	Location	Host	Reason for visit	References
13	23–25 January	Switzerland	Davos		World Economic Forum	
14	11–13 February	Russia	Moscow	Vladimir Putin, president	Official visit	
15	4–5 April	Denmark	Copenhagen	Margrethe II, Queen	State visit	
16	6–10 April	China	Beijing	Xi Jinping, President of China	Official visit	
17	16–18 April	Kazakhstan	Astana	Nursultan Nazarbayev, president	State visit	
18	13–15 May	Lithuania	Vilnius	Dalia Grybauskaitė, President of Lithuania	State visit	
19	28–29 May	Iceland	Reykjavík	Ólafur Ragnar Grímsson, president	State visit	
20	9–11 July	France	Paris	Francois Hollande, president	Official visit	
21	4 September	Sweden	Stockholm	Fredrik Reinfeldt, Prime Minister of Sweden	Meeting of the US President with Scandinavian heads of state	
22	9–11 September	Latvia	Riga	Andris Bērziņš, president	State visit	
23	15 September	Sweden	Stockholm	Carl XVI Gustav, king	40th anniversary celebrations of the accession to the throne of King Carl XVI Gustaf	
24	23–25 September	Russia	Salekhard	Vladimir Putin, president	Working visit	
25	8–10 October	Poland	Warsaw	Bronisław Komorowski, president	Met the presidents of European states	
26	15–16 October	Switzerland	Bern	Ueli Maurer, president	State visit	
27	16–17 November	Germany	Freiburg	Horst Köhler, former president of Germany	Received the Friedrich-August-von-Hayek-Stiftung Prize	
28	9–11 December	South Africa	Johannesburg	Jacob Zuma, president	State memorial service of former president Nelson Mandela (10 Dec)	

=== 2014 ===
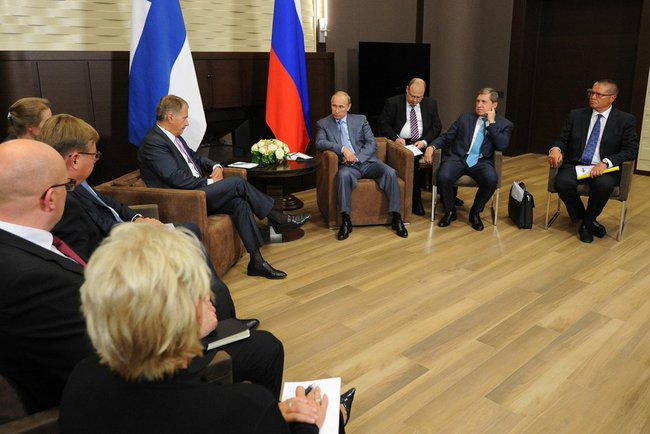
Vladimir Putin and Sauli Niinistö in the Sochi. August 2014.

- 15 trips abroad, of which one was a state visit.

Finnish President Sauli Niinistö's presidential visits in 2014
No.	Date	Country	Location	Host	Reason for visit	References
29	12–13 January	Sweden	Sälen	Fredrik Reinfeldt, Prime Minister	Rikskonferens Seminar in Sälen	
30	23–24 January	Switzerland	Davos		World Economic Forum	
31	6–12 February	Russia	Sochi	Vladimir Putin, president	Working visit 2014 Winter Olympics	
32	11–13 March	Lebanon	Beirut	Michel Suleiman, president	Official visit	
33	23–25 March	Netherlands	The Hague	Mark Rutte, prime minister	Nuclear Security Summit in The Hague, met Xi Jinping, Barack Obama and Abdullah Gül	
34	3–4 June	Poland	Warsaw	Bronisław Komorowski, president	Events dedicated to the 25th anniversary of Poland's liberation, met with Petro Poroshenko	
35	15 August	Russia	Sochi	Vladimir Putin, president	Working visit	
36	16 August	Ukraine	Kyiv	Petro Poroshenko, President of Ukraine	Working visit	
37	4–5 September	United Kingdom	Newport	David Cameron, Prime Minister of the United Kingdom	Nato 2014 Wales summit	
38	20–25 September	United States	New York	Ban Ki-moon, Secretary-General of the United Nations	Opening of United Nations General Assembly	
39	29–30 September	Portugal	Braga	Aníbal Cavaco Silva, president	Met the presidents of European states	
40	6–8 October	Germany	Frankfurt		Frankfurt Book Fair	
41	8–11 October	Canada	Ottawa	Stephen Harper, prime minister	State visit	
42	30 October – 1 November	Iceland	Reykjavík	Ólafur Ragnar Grímsson, president	Arctic Circle assembly	
43	4–5 November	Italy	Rome	Giorgio Napolitano, president	Working visit	

=== 2015 ===
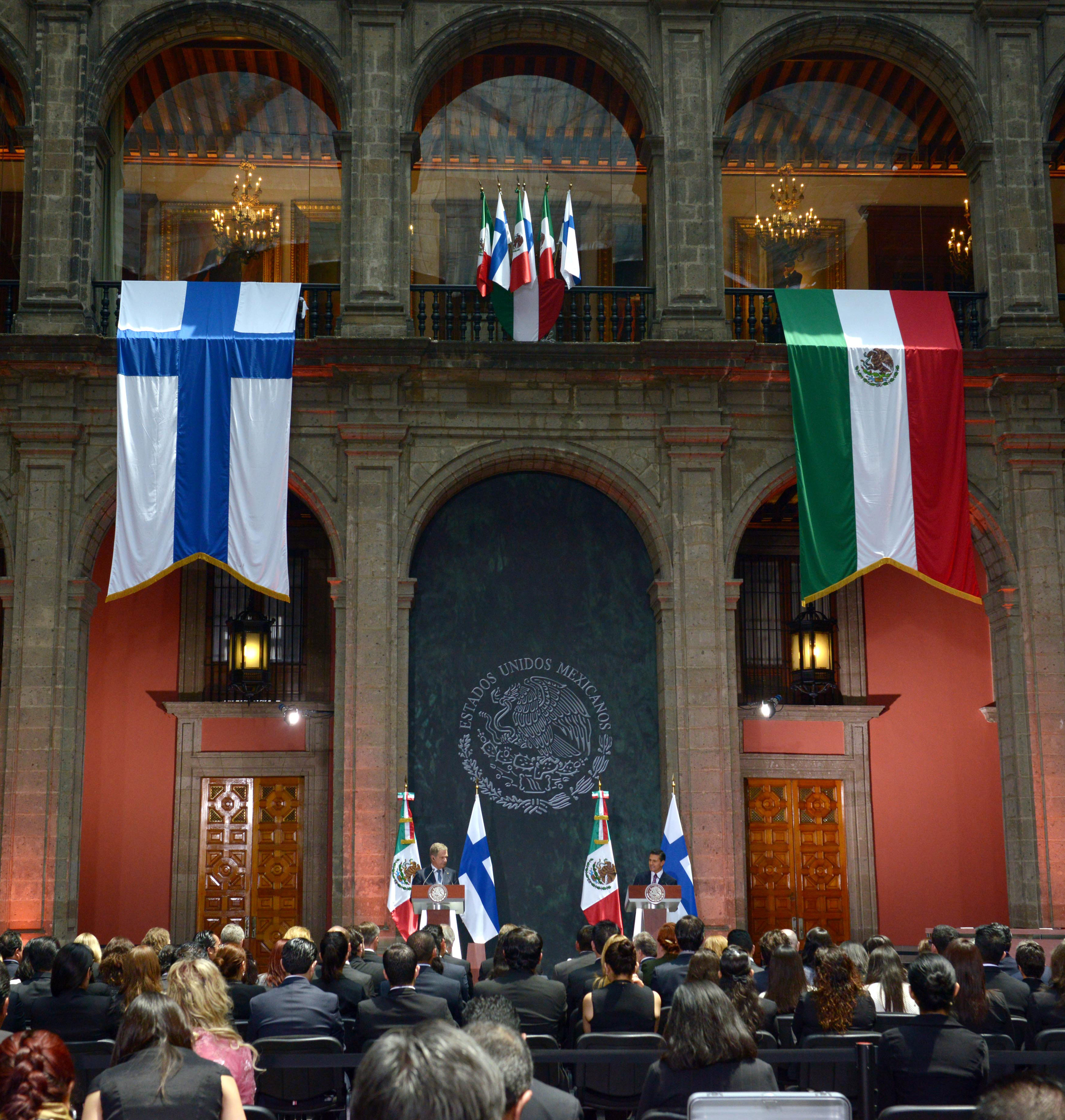
Niinistö and Enrique Peña Nieto in Mexico City. May 2015.

- 15 trips, of which 3 were state visits.

Finnish President Sauli Niinistö's presidential visits in 2015
No.	Date	Country	Location	Host	Reason for visit	References
44	21–22 January	Belgium	Brussels	Several	Met the heads of various EU institutions	
45	6–8 February	Germany	Munich		Munich Security Conference	
46	1 March	Sweden	Falun		2015 World Ski Championships	
47	30 March – 2 April	Poland	Warsaw	Bronislaw Komorowski, president	State visit	
48	11–13 April	United Arab Emirates	Abu Dhabi	Khalifa bin Zayed Al Nahyan, President of the United Arab Emirates	Official visit	
49	21–22 April	Sweden	Stockholm	Carl XVI Gustav, king	King of Sweden's 40th jubilee	
50	13–14 May	Germany	Aachen	Joachim Gauck, Bundespräsident	Charlemagne Prize ceremony	
51	23–27 May	Mexico	Mexico City	Enrique Peña Nieto, President of Mexico	State visit	
52	9–10 June	Kazakhstan	Astana	Nursultan Nazarbayev, President of Kazakhstan	Working visit	
53	16 June	Russia	Moscow	Vladimir Putin, President of Russia	Working visit	
54	21–22 September	Germany	Wartburg, Erfurt	Joachim Gauck, Bundespräsident	Meeting of European presidents	
55	24–29 September	United States	New York	Ban Ki-moon, Secretary-General of the United Nations	Speech at the Opening of United Nations General Assembly	
56	12–15 October	Turkey	Ankara	Recep Tayyip Erdogan, President of Turkey	Official visit	
57	2–4 November	Indonesia	Jakarta	Joko Widodo, President of Indonesia	State visit	
58	30 November	France	Paris		UN Climate Change Conference	

=== 2016 ===
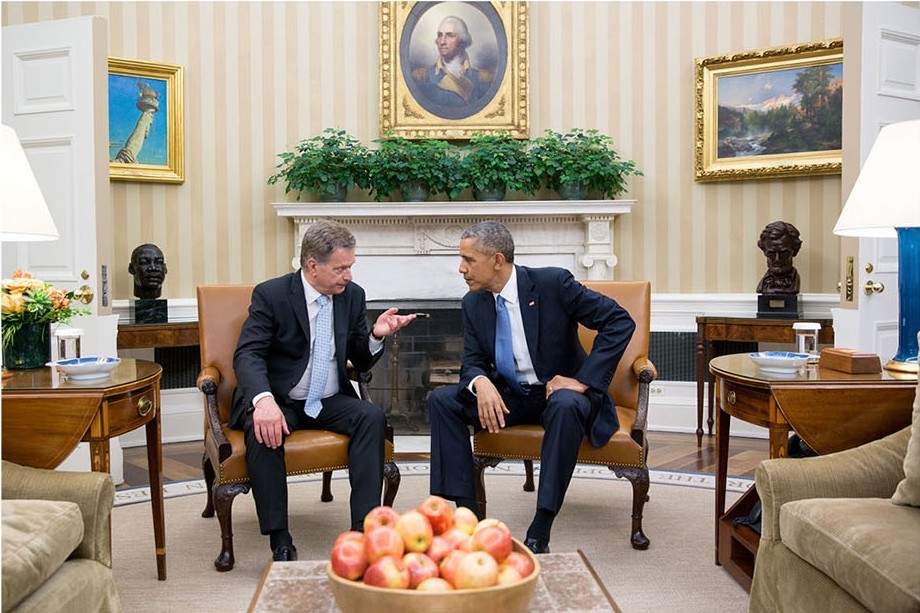
Sauli Niinistö and Barack Obama in the Oval Office, Washington, D.C. 2016

- 16 trips, of which one was a state visit.

Finnish President Sauli Niinistö's presidential visits in 2016
No.	Date	Country	Location	Host	Reason for visit	References
59	21–22 January	Switzerland	Davos		World Economic Forum	
60	4–5 February	Austria	Vienna	Heinz Fischer, President of Austria	Official visit	
61	12–14 February	Germany	Munich		Munich Security Conference	
62	7–11 March	Japan	Tokyo, Kyoto	Shinzo Abe, Prime Minister of Japan	Official visit and meeting with the Emperor of Japan Akihito	
63	22 March	Russia	Moscow	Vladimir Putin, President of Russia	Meeting with Putin	
64	31 March – 1 April	United States	Washington		2016 Nuclear Security Summit	
65	30 April	Sweden	Stockholm	Stefan Löfven, Prime Minister of Sweden	Working visit, discussions on NATO	
66	12–15 May	United States	Washington	Barack Obama, President of the United States	Official visit, meeting of US and Nordic leaders	
67	17–18 May	Estonia	Tallinn, Viljandi, Ärma	Toomas Hendrik Ilves, President of Estonia	State visit	
68	8–9 July	Poland	Warsaw	Jens Stoltenberg, Secretary General of NATO	2016 NATO Warsaw Summit	
69	16–18 August	Uruguay	Montevideo	Tabaré Vázquez, President of Uruguay	Official visit	
70	18–21 August	Brazil	Rio de Janeiro		Rio Olympics	
71	13–14 September	Bulgaria	Plovdiv, Sofia	Rosen Plevneliev, President of Bulgaria	Arraiolos Group meeting	
72	18–21 September	United States	New York	Ban Ki-moon, Secretary-General of the United Nations	Opening of United Nations General Assembly	
73	25–26 October	Iran	Tehran	Hassan Rouhani, President of Iran	Official visit	
74	9–10 November	Belgium	Brussels		Meeting with leading EU officials	

=== 2017 ===
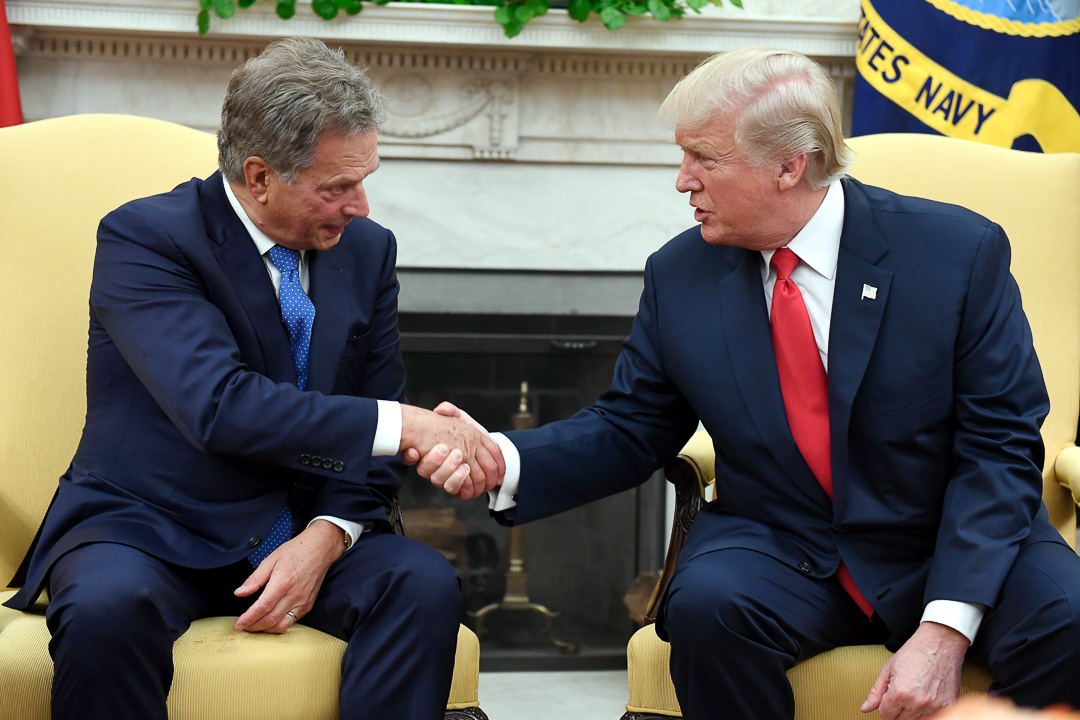
Niinistö and Donald Trump in Washington. August 2017.

- 11 trips, none of which was a state visit.

Finnish President Sauli Niinistö's presidential visits in 2017
No.	Date	Country	Location	Host	Reason for visit	References
75	16–19 February	Germany	Munich		Munich Security Conference	
76	13 March	Sweden	Stockholm	Stefan Löfven, Prime Minister	Celebration organised by Svenska Finlandsfrivilligas Minnesförening, in honour of the end of the Winter War	
77	30 March	Russia	Arkhangelsk	Vladimir Putin, president	IV International Arctic Forum	
78	9–10 May	Norway	Oslo	Harald V, King of Norway	Norwegian royal couple's 80th birthday, meeting with Prime Minister Erna Solberg	
79	11–12 May	Germany	Berlin	Frank-Walter Steinmeier, President of Germany	Working visit	
80	13 May	Estonia	Tallinn		Lennart Meri Conference	
81	10 June	Estonia	Tallinn		Finland 100 day of celebrations	
82	19–20 June	Kazakhstan	Astana	Nursultan Nazarbayev, President of Kazakhstan	Astana World Expo	
83	24 August	Sweden	Stockholm	Carl XVI Gustaf, King of Sweden	Celebration of Finland's 100th Anniversary	
84	29 August	United States	Washington, D.C.	Donald Trump, President	Working visit	
85	18–21 September	United States	New York	António Guterres, Secretary-General of the United Nations	Opening of United Nations General Assembly	
85	21–23 September	United States	Minnesota		Celebration of the Centennial of the Republic of Finland	

== Second term of office ==
Niinistö's second term of six years began on 1 February 2018 and ended on 1 March 2024.

=== 2018 ===
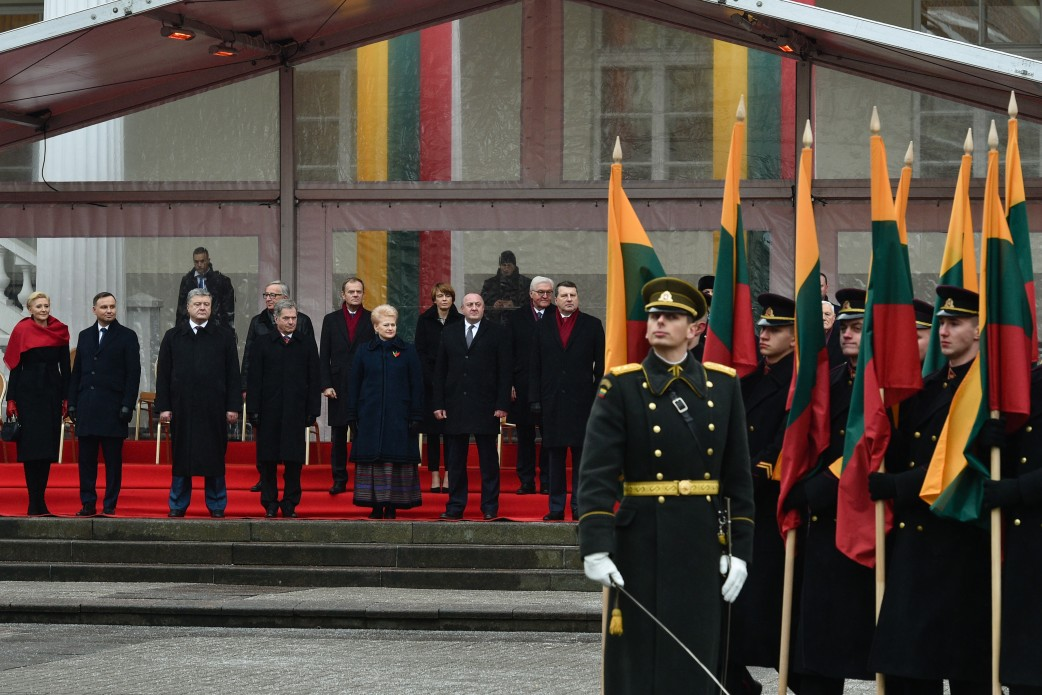
Niinistö was involved in the Centennial of the Restored State of Lithuania event in Vilnius, 2018

- 13 trips abroad, one of which was a state visit.

Finnish President Sauli Niinistö's presidential visits in 2018
No.	Date	Country	Location	Host	Reason for visit	References
86	16–18 February	Germany	Munich		Munich Security Conference	
87	18 February	Lithuania	Vilnius	Dalia Grybauskaitė, President of Lithuania	Centennial of the Restored State of Lithuania	
88	28 March	Belgium	Brussels		Met with Jean-Claude Juncker, Federica Mogherini, Antonio Tajani	
89	10–12 April	Croatia	Zagreb	Kolinda Grabar-Kitarović, President of Croatia	State visit	
90	26 May	(Georgia (country)) Georgia	Tbilisi	Giorgi Margvelashvili, President of Georgia	100th Anniversary of Georgia's First Democratic Republic, also met Armenian president Armen Sarkissian	
91	22 June	Estonia	Tartu	Kersti Kaljulaid, President of Estonia	100th Anniversary of the Estonian Republic	
92	11–12 July	Belgium	Brussels	Jens Stoltenberg, Secretary General of NATO	2018 NATO Brussels Summit	
93	22 August	Russia	Sochi	Vladimir Putin, President of Russia	Working visit	
94	13–14 September	Latvia	Riga	Raimonds Vējonis, President of Latvia	Arraiolos meeting	
95	23–28 September	United States	New York, Washington, D.C.	António Guterres, Secretary-General of the United Nations	Opening of United Nations General Assembly, Nelson Mandela Peace Summit, delivered a speech at the Brookings Institution	
96	10–11 November	France	Paris	Emmanuel Macron, President of France	Armistice Day centenary, Paris Peace Forum	
97	18 November	Latvia	Riga	Raimonds Vējonis, President of Latvia	Latvian Centennial Celebration	
98	3 December	Poland	Katowice	Michał Kurtyka	United Nations Climate Change conference	

=== 2019 ===
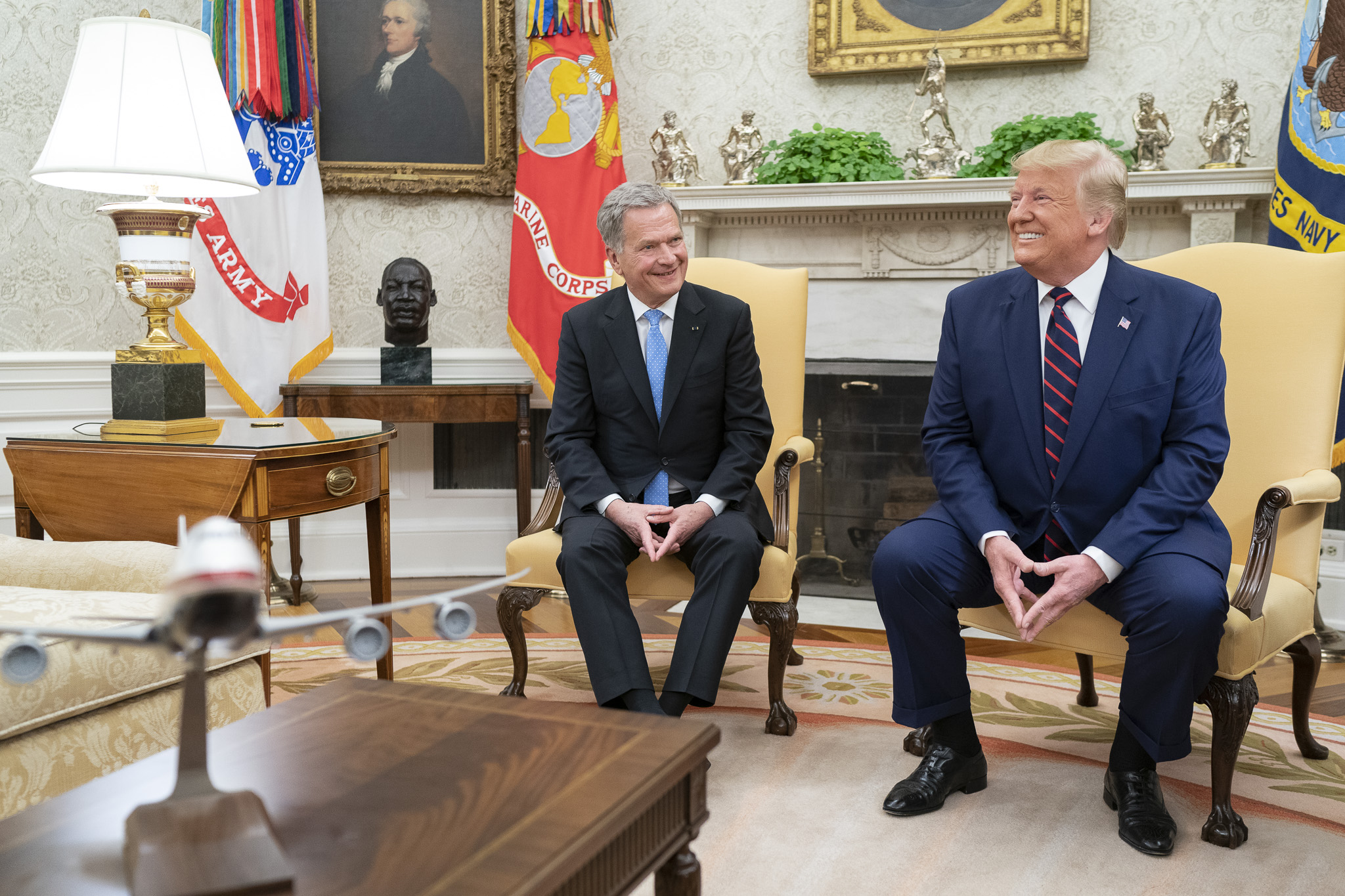
Niinistö and Donald Trump in Washington. October 2019.

- 12 trips, of which one was a state visit.

Finnish President Sauli Niinistö's presidential visits in 2019
No.	Date	Country	Location	Host	Reason for visit	References
99	1 January	Austria	Vienna	Alexander Van der Bellen, President of Austria	Vienna Philharmonic New Year's Concert	
100	14–15 January	China	Beijing	Xi Jinping, President of China	State visit	
101	23 January	France	Strasbourg	Thorbjørn Jagland, Secretary General of the Council of Europe	Parliamentary Assembly of the Council of Europe	
102	15–17 February	Germany	Munich		Munich Security Conference	
103	9 April	Russia	Saint Petersburg	Vladimir Putin, President of Russia	International Arctic Forum	
104	23–24 May	Slovenia	Ljubljana	Borut Pahor, President of Slovenia	Official visit	
105	14 July	France	Paris	Emmanuel Macron, President of France	French National Day celebration	
106	12–14 September	Ukraine	Kyiv	Volodymyr Zelenskyy, President of Ukraine	Official visit	
107	22–25 September	United States	New York City	António Guterres, Secretary-General of the United Nations	Opening of United Nations General Assembly	
108	2 October	United States	Washington D.C.	Donald Trump, President of the United States	Working visit	
109	15–16 October	Ethiopia	Addis Abeba	Sahle-Work Zewde, President of Ethiopia	Official visit	
110	21–23 October	Japan	Tokyo	Naruhito, Emperor of Japan	Enthronement of the Emperor	

=== 2020 ===
- Only on trip abroad due to the COVID-19 pandemic.

Finnish President Sauli Niinistö's presidential visits in 2020
No.	Date	Country	Location	Host	Reason for visit	References
111	27 January	Poland	Auschwitz	Andrzej Duda, President of Poland	75th anniversary of the liberation of the Auschwitz concentration camp	

=== 2021 ===
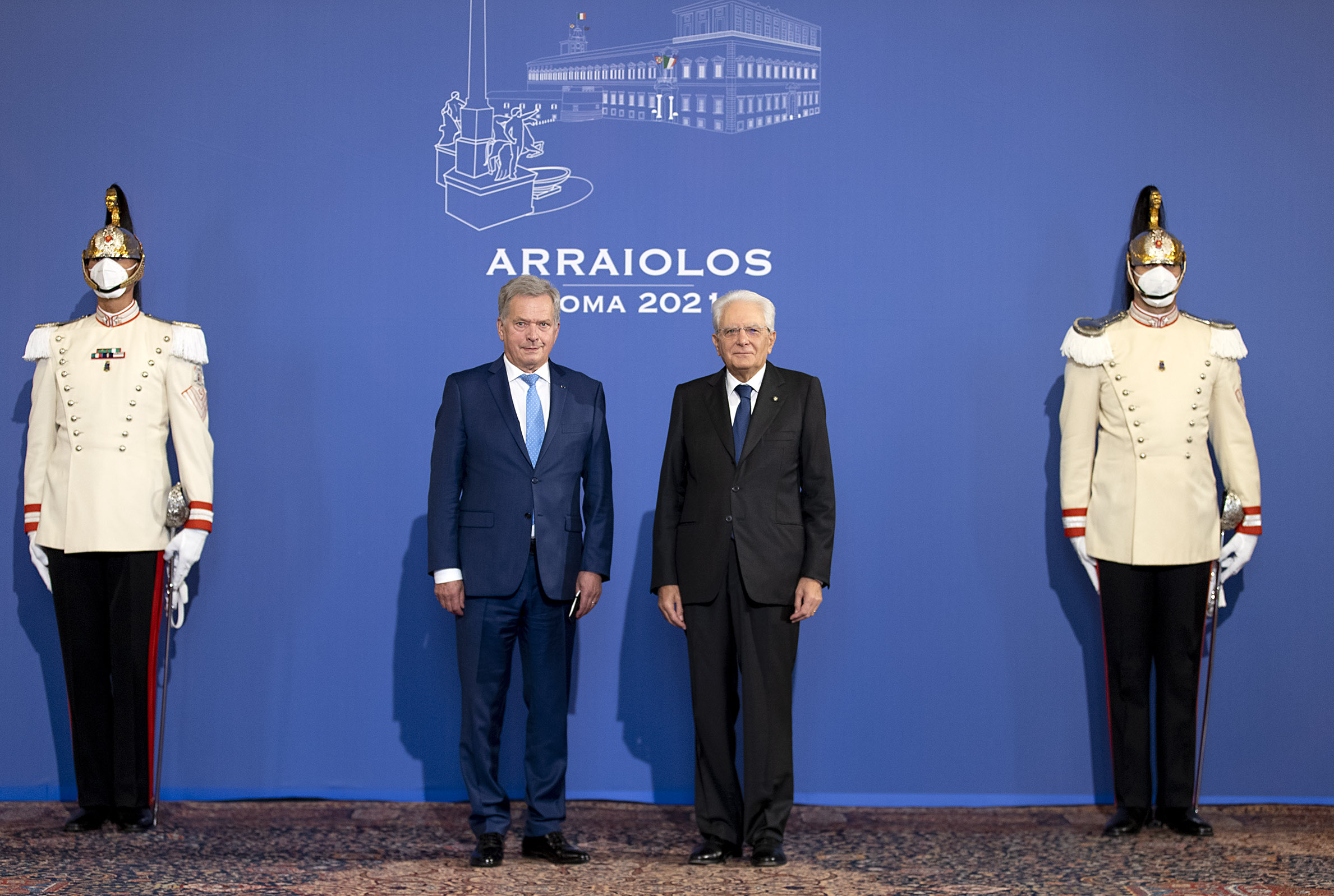
Sergio Mattarella and Niinistö in Rome. September 2021

- 9 trips abroad, none of which were state visits.

Finnish President Sauli Niinistö's presidential visits in 2021
No.	Date	Country	Location	Host	Reason for visit	References
112.	23 August	Ukraine	Kyiv	Volodymyr Zelenskyy, President of Ukraine	International Crimea Platform	
113	7 September	France	Paris	Emmanuel Macron, president	Working visit	
114	15 September	Italy	Rome	Sergio Mattarella, president	Arraiolos Group meeting	
115	17–21 September	United States	New York	António Guterres, Secretary-General of the United Nations	Opening of United Nations General Assembly	
116	13 October	Sweden	Malmö	Stefan Löfven, Prime Minister	Malmö International Forum on Holocaust	
117	29 October	Russia	Moscow	Vladimir Putin, president	Working visit	
118	1–2 November	Scotland	Glasgow	Alok Sharma, Business, Energy and Industrial Strategy Secretary	UN Climate Change Conference	
119	12 November	Sweden	Stockholm	Sverker Göranson, General (ret.)	225th anniversary of the Royal Swedish Academy of War Sciences	
120	21–23 November	Germany	Berlin	Frank-Walter Steinmeier, President of Germany	Working visit	

=== 2022 ===
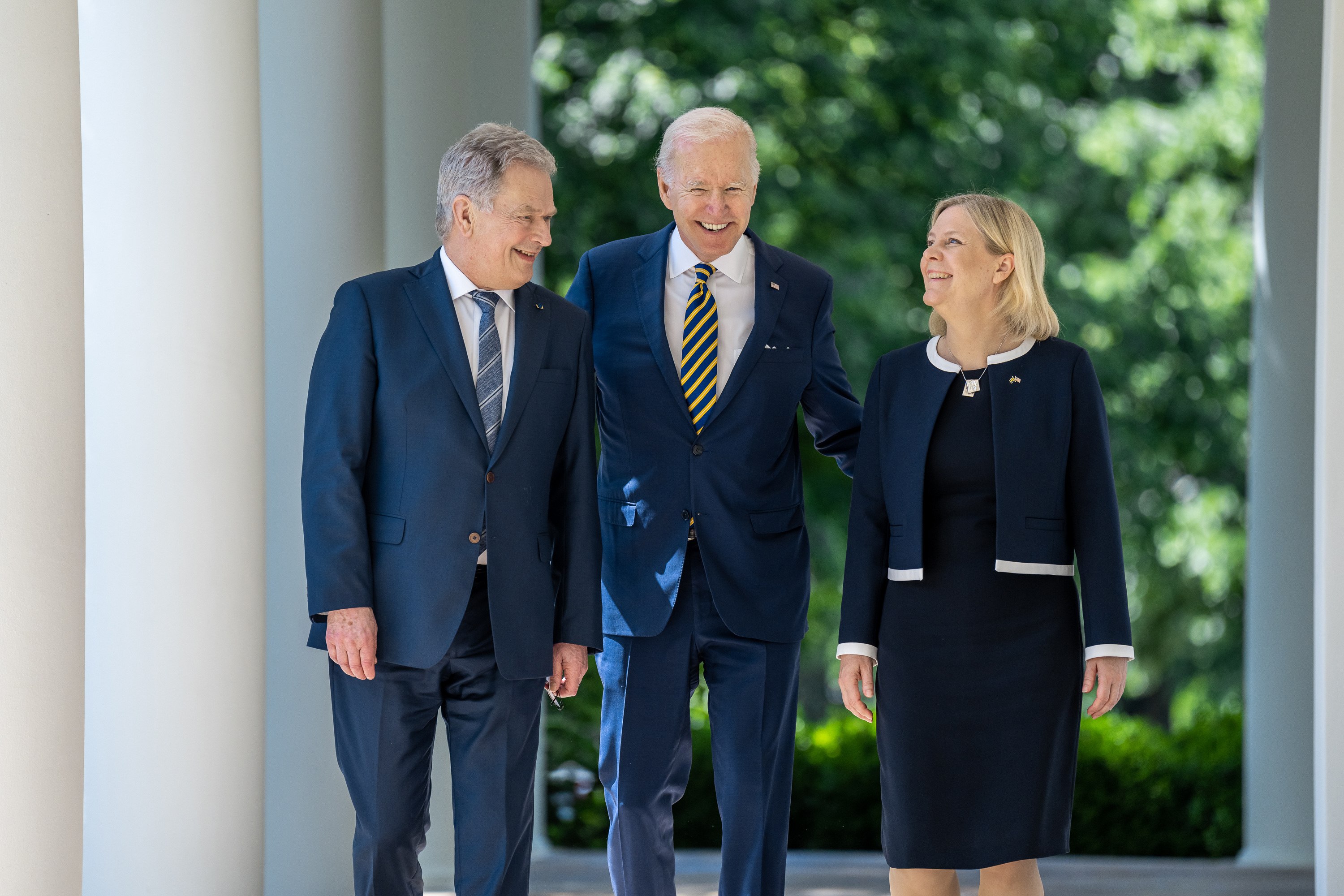
Niinistö with Joe Biden and Magdalena Andersson in Washington. May 2022.

- 12 trips abroad, 2 of which were state visits.

Finnish President Sauli Niinistö's presidential visits in 2022
No.	Date	Country	Location	Host	Reason for visit	References
121	18–20 February	Germany	Munich		Munich Security Conference	
122	3 March	United States	Washington	Joe Biden, President of the United States	Working visit	
123	14–15 March	United Kingdom	London	Boris Johnson, Prime Minister of the UK	Joint Expeditionary Force meeting	
124	21 March	France	Paris	Emmanuel Macron, President of France	Working visit	
125	17–18 May	Sweden	Stockholm	Carl XVI Gustaf, King	State visit	
126	19 May	United States	Washington	Joe Biden, President of the United States	Working visit together with Prime Minister of Sweden Magdalena Andersson	
127	28–30 June	Spain	Madrid	Pedro Sánchez, Prime minister of Spain	NATO 2022 Madrid summit	
128	19 September	United Kingdom	London	Charles III, King of United Kingdom	Guest at state funeral of Elizabeth II	
129	19–21 September	United States	New York	António Guterres, Secretary-General of the United Nations	Opening of United Nations General Assembly, received Global Citizen Award	
129	22 September	United States	Washington, D.C.		Meeting with Nancy Pelosi, James Risch and Mitch McConnell	
130	October 4	Estonia	Tallinn and Tapa	Alar Karis, President of Estonia	Working visit	
131	10–11 October	Norway	Oslo	Harald V, King of Norway	Official visit, met prime Minister Jonas Gahr Støre and King Harald V of Norway, Queen Sonja and Crown Prince Haakon at the Royal Palace	
132	19–20 October	Iceland	Reykjavík	Guðni Th. Jóhannesson, president	State visit	
133	19 December	Latvia	Riga	Krišjānis Kariņš, Prime Minister	Joint Expeditionary Force meeting	

=== 2023 ===
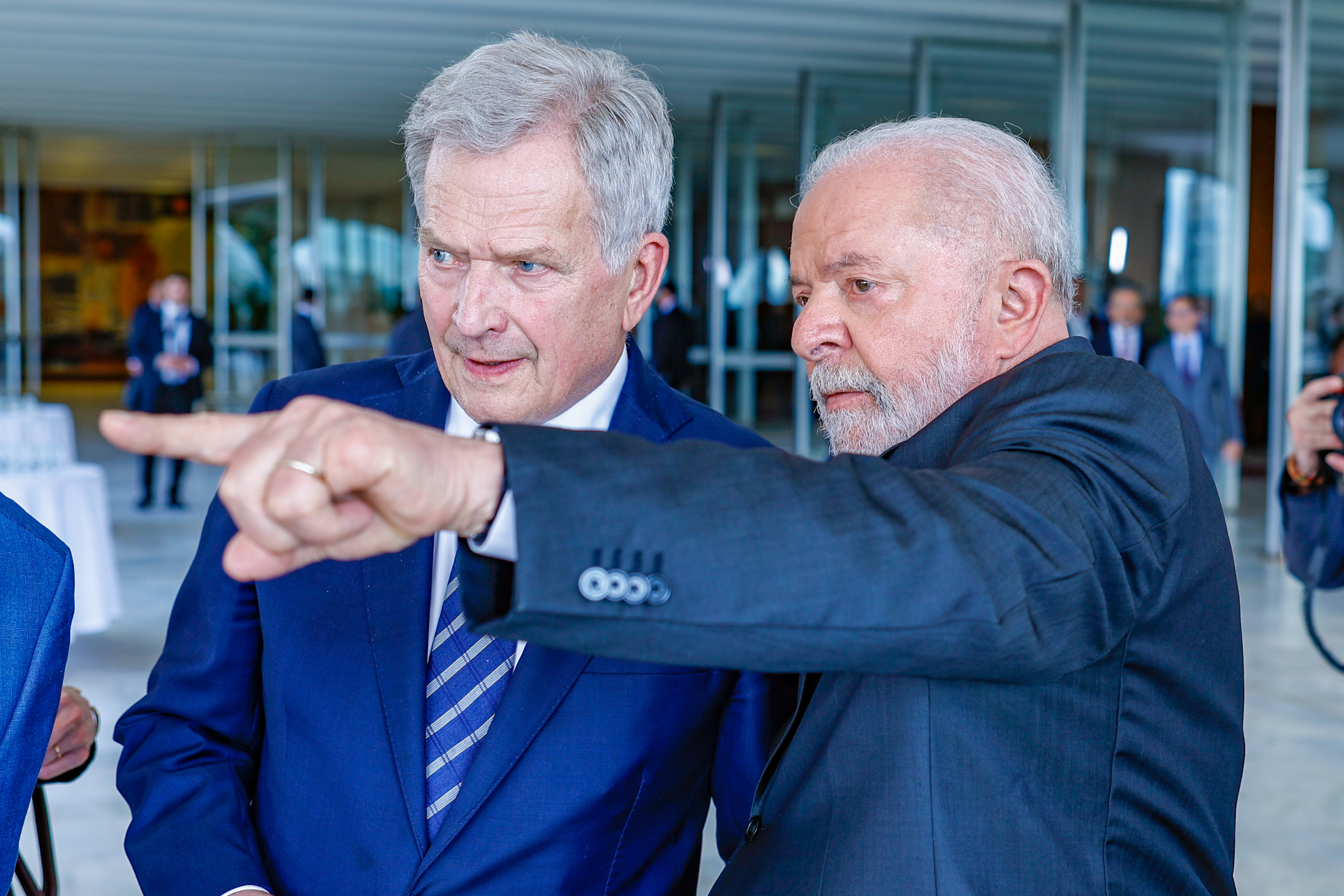
Lula da Silva and Sauli Niinistö in São Paulo. June 2023.

- 16 trips abroad, 6 of which were state visits.

Finnish President Sauli Niinistö's presidential visits in 2023
No.	Date	Country	Location	Host	Reason for visit	References
134	24 January	Ukraine	Kyiv, Bucha	Volodymyr Zelenskyy, President of Ukraine	State visit	
135	6–10 March	United States	Washington, D.C. and Santa Clara, California	Joe Biden, President of the United States	Official visit to Stanford University, met with Jay Inslee and president Joe Biden	
136	16–17 March	Turkey	Ankara	Recep Tayyip Erdogan, President of Turkey	Official visit, Niinistö travelled to Ankara to meet with Turkish President Recep Tayyip Erdoğan. They spoke, among other things, about EU-Turkey relations, Finland's application to join NATO and efforts to combat terrorism.	
137	4 April	Belgium	Brussels	Jens Stoltenberg, Secretary General of NATO	Finland's accession to NATO	
138	25–26 April	South Africa	Pretoria	Cyril Ramaphosa, President of South Africa	State visit	
139	27–28 April	Namibia	Windhoek	Hage Geingob, President of Namibia	State visit	
140	6 May	United Kingdom	London	Charles III, King of United Kingdom	Guest at coronation of Charles III and Camilla	
141	1–2 June	Brazil	São Paulo	Luiz Inácio Lula da Silva, President of Brazil	State visit	
142	11–12 July	Lithuania	Vilnius	Gitanas Nausėda, President of Lithuania	NATO Vilnius Summit	
143	14–15 September	Sweden	Stockholm	Carl XVI Gustav, king	Golden Jubilee of Carl XVI Gustaf	
144	18–21 September	United States	New York	António Guterres, UN General Secretary	Opening of United Nations General Assembly	
145	5–6 October	Portugal	Porto	Marcelo Rebelo de Sousa, President of Portugal	Arraiolos Group meeting	
146	12–13 October	Sweden	Visby, Gotland	Ulf Kristersson, Prime Minister of Sweden	Joint Expeditionary Force meeting	
147	23–24 October	Italy	Rome	Sergio Mattarella, president	State visit	
148	15–16 November	Germany	Bonn	Frank-Walter Steinmeier, President of Germany	Official visit	
149	20–21 November	Poland	Warsaw	Andrzej Duda, President of Poland	State visit	

=== 2024 ===
- Three trips abroad, no state visits.

Finnish President Sauli Niinistö's presidential visits in 2023
No.	Date	Country	Location	Host	Reason for visit	References
150	12 February	Norway	Oslo	Jonas Gahr Støre, Prime Minister of Norway	Working visit	
151	24–25 February	Namibia	Windhoek	Nangolo Mbumba, President of Namibia	State funeral of Hage Geingob, President of Namibia	
152	26 February	France	Paris	Emmanuel Macron, President of France	Working visit	

== Multilateral meetings ==
Multilateral meetings of the following intergovernmental organizations took place during Sauli Niinistö's presidency (2012–2024).

Group	Year											
Group	2012	2013	2014	2015	2016	2017	2018	2019	2020	2021	2022	2023
UNGA	22–29 September, (United States) New York City	27 September, (United States) New York City	20–25 September, (United States) New York City	24–29 September, (United States) New York City	18–21 September, (United States) New York City	18–21 September, (United States) New York City	23–28 September, (United States) New York City	22–25 September, (United States) New York City	26 September, (videoconference) (United States) New York City	17–21 September, (United States) New York City	19–21 September, (United States) New York City	18–21 September, (United States) New York City
NATO	20–21 May (United States) Chicago	None	4–5 September, (United Kingdom) Newport	None	8–9 July, (Poland) Warsaw	Not Invited	11–12 July, (Belgium) Brussels	Not Invited	None	Not Invited	28–30 June, (Spain) Madrid	11–12 July, (Lithuania) Vilnius
NSS	26–27 March, (South Korea) Seoul	None	24–25 March, (Netherlands) The Hague	None	31 March – 1 April, (United States) Washington, D.C.	None						
JEF	Didn't exist		None								14–15 March, (United Kingdom) London	12–13 October, (Sweden) Visby
JEF	Didn't exist		None								19 December, (Latvia) Riga	12–13 October, (Sweden) Visby
Others	None											
██ = Did not attend

== Post-presidential trips of societal importance ==
Former Finnish President Sauli Niinistö's post-presidential visits
No.	Year	Date	Country	Location	Host	Reason for visit	Other	References
1	2024	20 March	Belgium	Brussels	Ursula von der Leyen, President of the European Commission	Announcement that Niinistö is to write a report on how to enhance Europe's civilian and defence preparedness and readiness		
2	2024	17–18 May	Sweden	Stockholm	Samfundet Sverige-Finland	100th anniversary of the SSF, received an award from the community	Interview in Svenska Dagbladet (in Swedish)	
3	2024	N/A	United States	Washington D.C.		Talks with Democratic and Republican politicians on security in Europe		
4	2024	30 October	Belgium	Brussels	Ursula von der Leyen, President of the European Commission	Niinistö handed over the report on strengthening the EU's civilian and defense preparedness and readiness		
5	2024	14 November	Belgium	Brussels	Ursula von der Leyen, President of the European Commission	Niinistö talks about his report in the European Parliament		
6	2025	23 January	United Kingdom	London	Bronwen Maddox, CEO of Chatham House	Appearance in a panel organized by Chatham House		
