= 90th anniversary of the Latvian Republic =

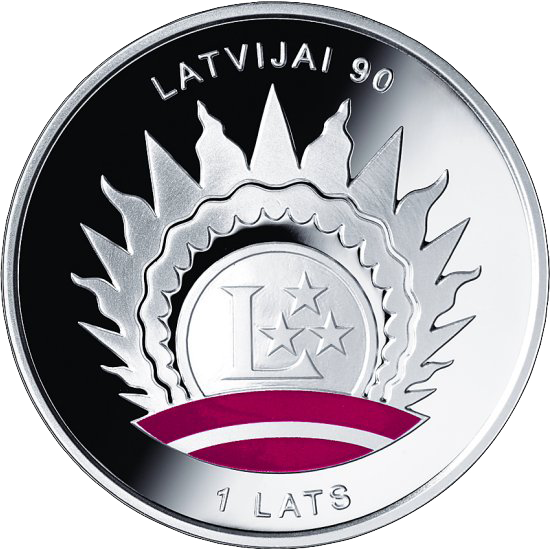
Commemorative coin celebrating Latvia's 90th Anniversary

The 90th Anniversary of the Latvian Republic was celebrated in 2008. Proclaimed on November 18, 1918, the Latvian republic asserted independence from Imperial Russia. International de jure recognition was obtained on January 26, 1921.

In addition to the various domestic and international events organised to celebrate the anniversary, a commemorative stamp and coin were issued to mark the occasion. Various governments issued proclamations congratulating the Latvian republic; The US resolution, backed by Barack Obama, called for the US president to urge Russia to admit the illegality of the Soviet occupation. The 90th anniversary prompted the publication in 2010 of an academic retrospective of the Latvia nation state during the period of the occupation of the Baltic states.

== Domestic events ==
The celebrations, which spanned the month of November, were broadcast live and viewed by a total of 1.34 million Latvian residents, culminating with over 500,000 viewing President Valdis Zatlers' speech at the Freedom Monument on November 18, where a military parade was also held on that day.

== International events ==
A number of cultural events were held in Russia. On November 8 a concert was held in Moscow by the Moscow Latvian Culture Society Choir. On November 11 on Latvian Freedom Fighters' Remembrance Day saw the Russian premiere of the Latvian feature film "Defenders of Riga" at the Moscow Cinematography Center. The acclaimed chamber orchestra "Kremerata Baltica", pianist Vestards Šimkus, cellist Marta Sudraba and mezzo-soprano Baiba Berķe performed.

A concert program was held in the city of Vitebsk in Belarus, where contemporary and traditional Latvian music was showcased.

In addition to a gift of historical documents from the archives of the Hoover Institute related to Latvia–United States relations, the US granted Latvia inclusion into the Visa Waiver Program.

== United States resolution on the 90th anniversary of the Latvian Republic ==
In recognition the US Senate commemorated the event by resolution. The 90th anniversary of the Latvian Republic resolution (S.Con.Res. 87) was submitted to the U.S. Senate by Senator Gordon Smith (R-OR), during the 110th United States Congress. The resolution congratulated the people of Latvia on the 90th anniversary of Latvia's November 18, 1918, declaration of independence; commended the government of Latvia for its success in implementing political and economic reforms, for establishing political, religious and economic freedom, and for its commitment to human and civil rights; and called upon the US President and the Secretary of State to urge the government of the Russian Federation to acknowledge that the Soviet occupation of Latvia, Estonia, and Lithuania under the Molotov–Ribbentrop Pact and for the succeeding 51 years was illegal. The resolution was introduced on June 9, 2008, and passed unanimously without amendment on September 16, 2008.

=== Co-sponsors ===
The resolution was co-sponsored by (in alphabetical order):

- Sen. Robert Casey [D, PA]
- Sen. Richard Durbin [D, IL]
- Sen. Herbert Kohl [D, WI]
- Sen. Carl Levin [D, MI]
- Sen. Barack Obama [D, IL]
- Sen. George Voinovich [R, OH]

== See also ==
- Latvia 100
- 90th Anniversary of Estonian Republic
