= 100th Anniversary of the Estonian Republic =

National centennial celebration programme

100th Anniversary of the Estonian Republic Eesti Vabariik 100
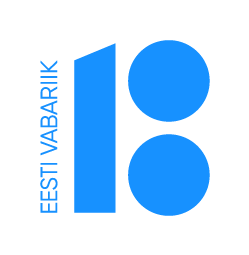
- Official logo
- Dates: April 2017-February 2020
- Location: Estonia
- Website: https://www.ev100.ee/en

The 100th Anniversary of the Estonian Republic (or more commonly used Estonia 100; Estonian: Eesti Vabariik 100) is an official government program for the celebration of the Republic of Estonia's 100th anniversary. The official anniversary was marked on 24 February 2018, while related celebrations and events took place from April 2017 to February 2020.

== Historical background ==
On 12 February 1919, the Estonian Provisional Government decided to consider 24 February to be the date of the independence of Estonia from Russia, which occurred when World War I was nearing its end. However, Estonia's independence came to a de facto end during World War II when the country was illegally occupied and annexed by the Soviet Union in 1940, then by Nazi Germany in 1941, before it was returned to Soviet rule in 1944 when it became the Estonian Soviet Socialist Republic. As a result, a government in exile was established.

As political upheavals took place throughout the Soviet Union in the 1980s, during the events of the Baltic Way, Estonia declared sovereignty on its territory in 1988, which restored its de facto independence on 8 May 1990 and declared Soviet rule illegal. Following the aborted coup in Moscow, the country's full de facto independence was restored after the Soviet troops failed to seize the Tallinn TV Tower on 20 August 1991. The Soviet State Council recognized the Estonian independence on 6 September 1991. Since 2004, Estonia has been a member of NATO and the European Union.

== Events ==
The centenary celebrations of the Republic of Estonia took place over three years, beginning in April 2017 to mark a century since Estonia's administrative borders took their current form, peaking while events on various important dates took place throughout 2018 and 2019, and coming to a grand close on 2 February 2020 when the 100th anniversary of the Tartu Peace Treaty was honoured.

=== Centennial parade ===
A military parade on Freedom Square in Tallinn was held on the occasion of the 100th anniversary. 1,100 troops and more than 100 pieces of military equipment took part in the parade. The parade was led by Gen. Riho Terras, while President Kersti Kaljulaid was present to greet the different units.

All service branches of the Estonian Defence Forces took part in the parade as well as soldiers from countries from NATO and other military partners of Estonia. The foreign countries that were represented were Finland, France, Georgia, Italy, Latvia, Lithuania, Poland, Sweden, Ukraine, the United Kingdom, Denmark, and the United States.

== Gallery ==
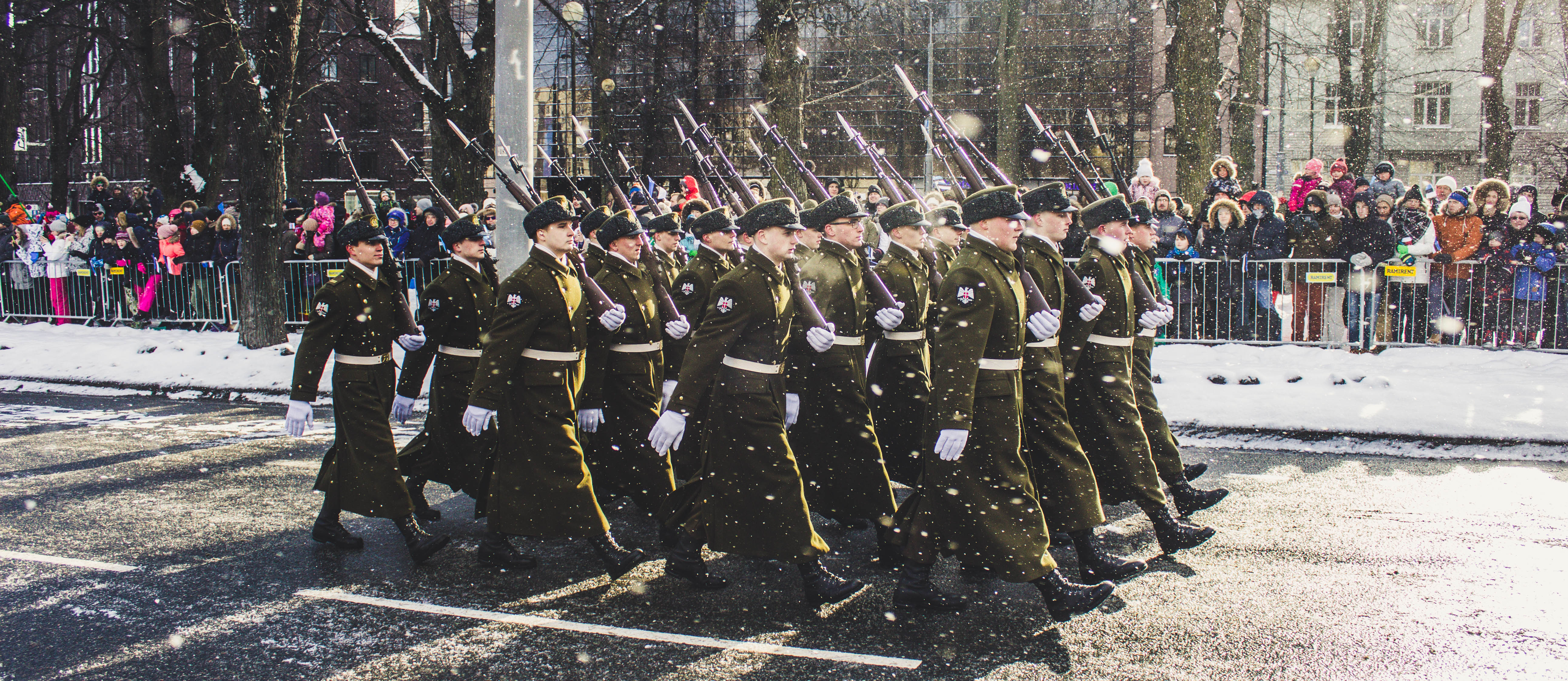
The Guard Battalion during the military parade on 24 February 2018

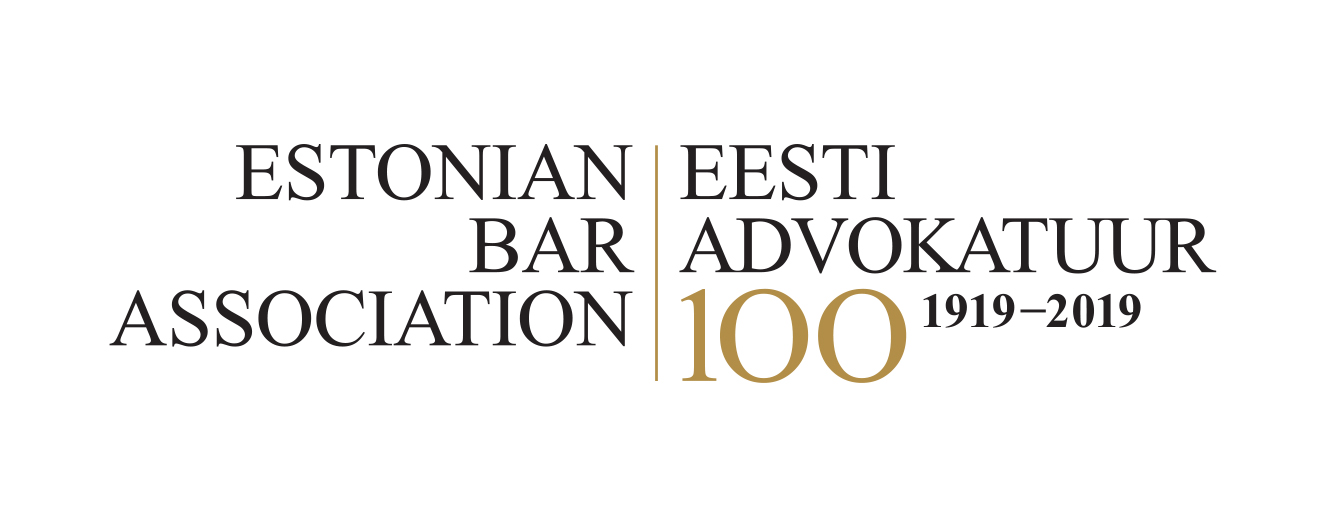
The logo of the centenary of the Estonian Bar Association celebrated in 2019

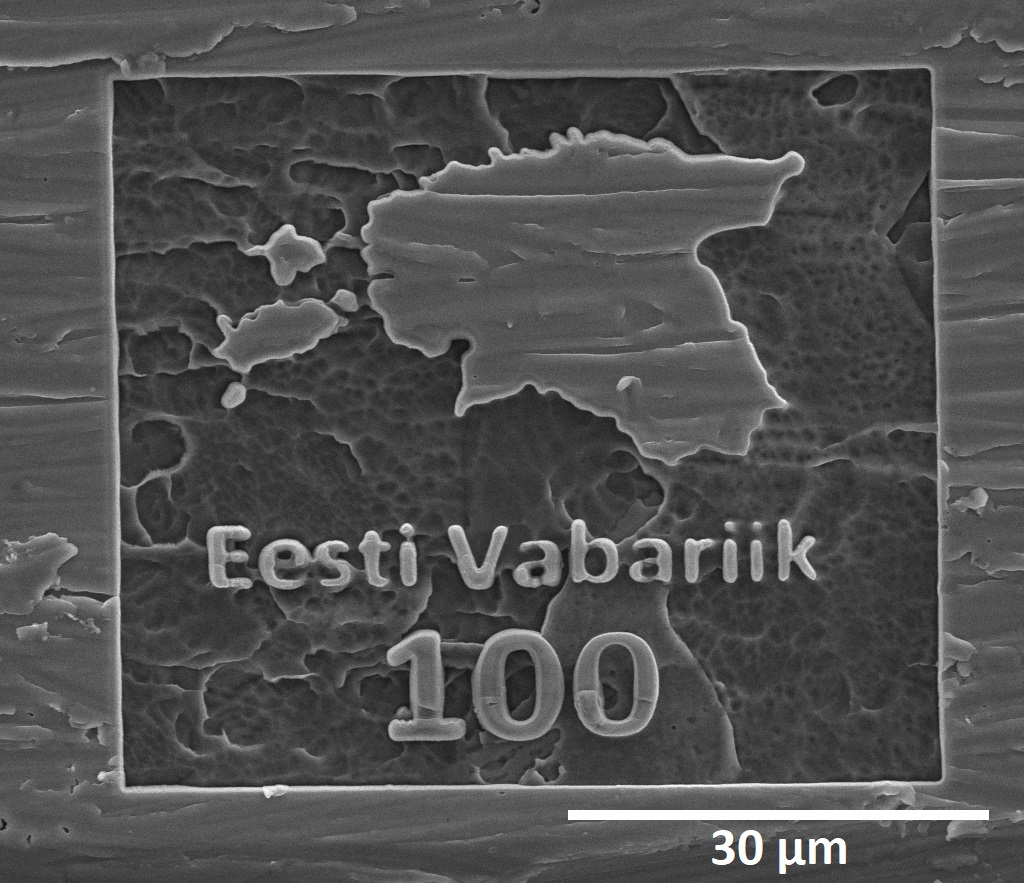
A microscopic engraving made in honor of the centenary by the Institute of Physics, University of Tartu

== See also ==
- 90th Anniversary of the Estonian Republic
- Independence Day (Estonia)
- Public holidays in Estonia
- 90th anniversary of the Latvian Republic
- 100th anniversary of the Latvian Republic
- Centennial of the Restored State of Lithuania
