= Latvia 100 =

Latvian independence celebrations

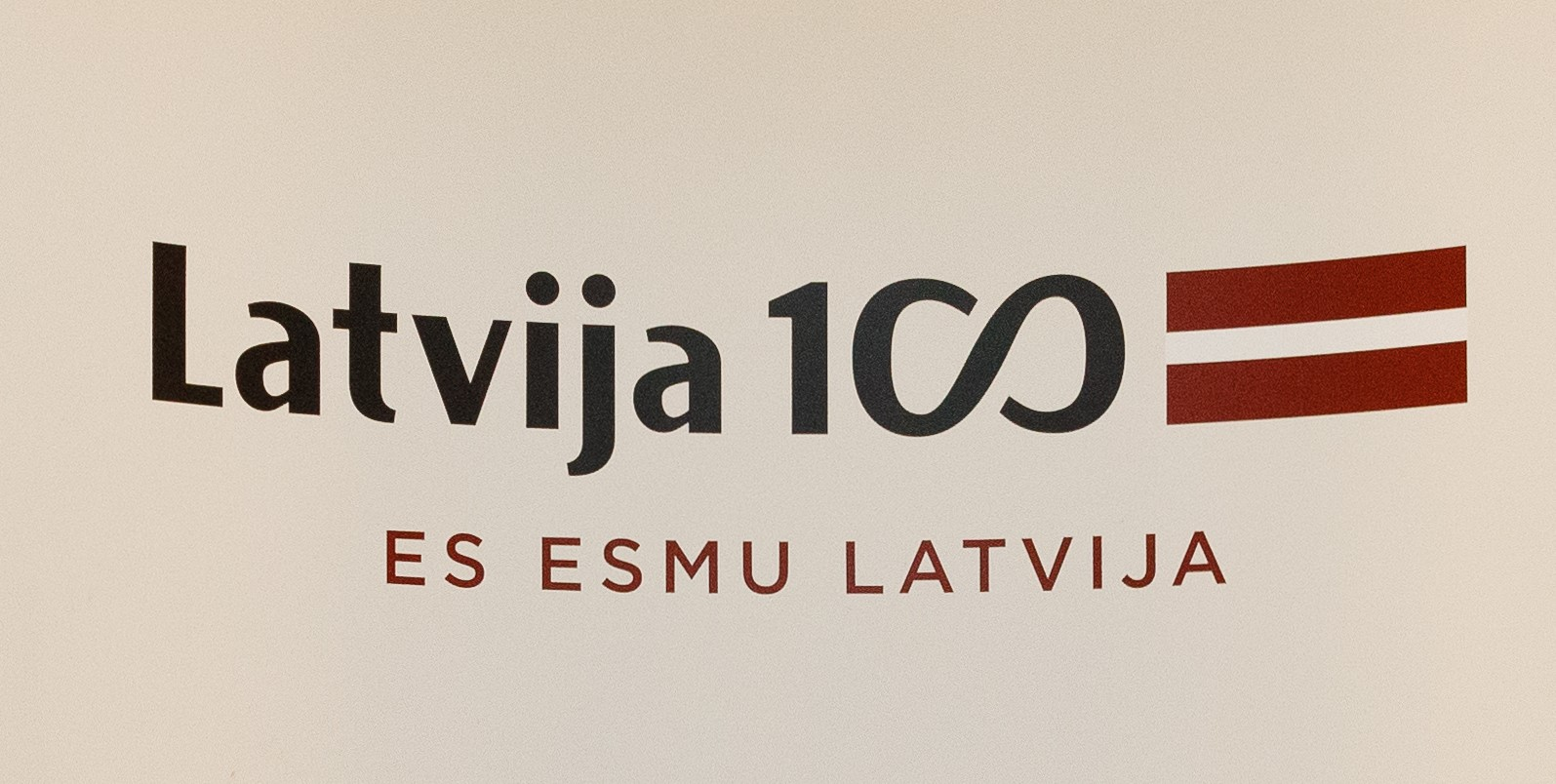
- Event logo at the Ministry of Foreign Affairs in Riga
- Native name: Latvijas valsts simtgade, Latvija 100
- Date: 2017-2021
- Location: Latvia
- Type: National
- Theme: 100th anniversary of the founding of Latvia
- Budget: €60 million
- Website: lv100.lv/en/

The 100th Anniversary of the Latvian Republic (Latvian: Latvijas valsts simtgade) also commercialized as Latvia 100 (Latvija 100) was a national event in Latvia celebrating the country's 100th anniversary since its 1918 establishment. The main celebrations were held on 18 November 2018, and other commemorative events are set to take place from 2017 to 2021. Outside from the official celebrations, 18 November is also a public holiday, being the Proclamation Day of the Republic of Latvia.

The slogan of the event was Es esmu Latvija ('I Am Latvia').

== Background ==
On 18 November 1918, The People's Council of Latvia, which was a coalition of competing Latvian political factions, proclaimed the independence of the Latvian region from the Russian Empire and established a new state, the Republic of Latvia, following a summit held inside the Latvian National Theatre. A Provisional Government was immediately created, with Kārlis Ulmanis acting as its first Prime Minister. Two and a half weeks later, Latvian War of Independence began, with the Red Army and the Imperial German Army invading the country, later joined by the West Russian Volunteer Army, in order to have a foothold in the Baltic states. The war ended with a Latvian/pan-Baltic victory in August 1920 and the signing of the Treaty of Riga.

== Focus of celebrations by year ==
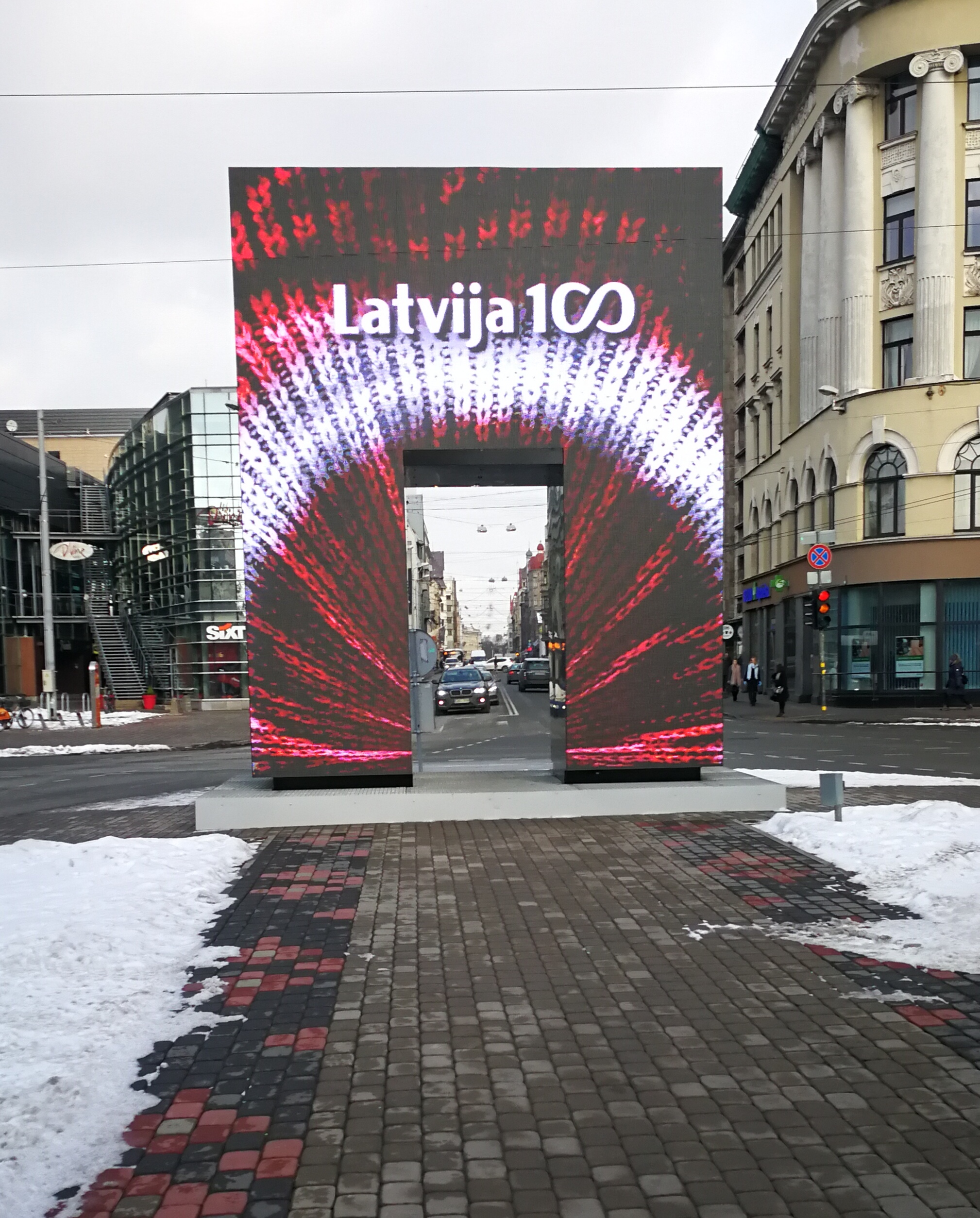
Event logo on a digital screen in Riga on Brīvības iela

Each year of the anniversary has a keyword in recognition of events that took place 100 years ago, which were significant to the foundation of the country.

- 2017 – The Year of Will. Honours the consolidation of the independence movement in Latvia.
- 2018 – The Year of Birth. Commemorates the creation of Latvia as well as the countries of the Baltics and Central and Eastern Europe from the ruins of former empires.
- 2019 – The Year of Courage. Commemorates those who died in the Latvian War of Independence.
- 2020 – The Year of Freedom. Honours freedom, the birth of parliamentarism with the first parliament elections and the election of the first Latvian president.
- 2021 – The Year of Growth. Commemoration of the events when Latvia was internationally recognised as a country and was accepted into the League of Nations.

== Events ==
The centennial was the biggest event in the history of modern Latvia. More than 800 wide-range celebratory events and festivities were planned to take place from May 2017 to January 2021 in Latvia and in more than 70 countries. The 5-year span included events that mark the centenaries of different stages of Latvia's path to independence, as well as Latvia's accomplishments after its statehood was achieved. The official celebrations started on May 4, 2017, the Day of the Restoration of the Independence of Latvia, with the Embrace Latvia (Latvian: Apskauj Latviju) initiative when citizens planted exactly 100 oaks along the country's border.

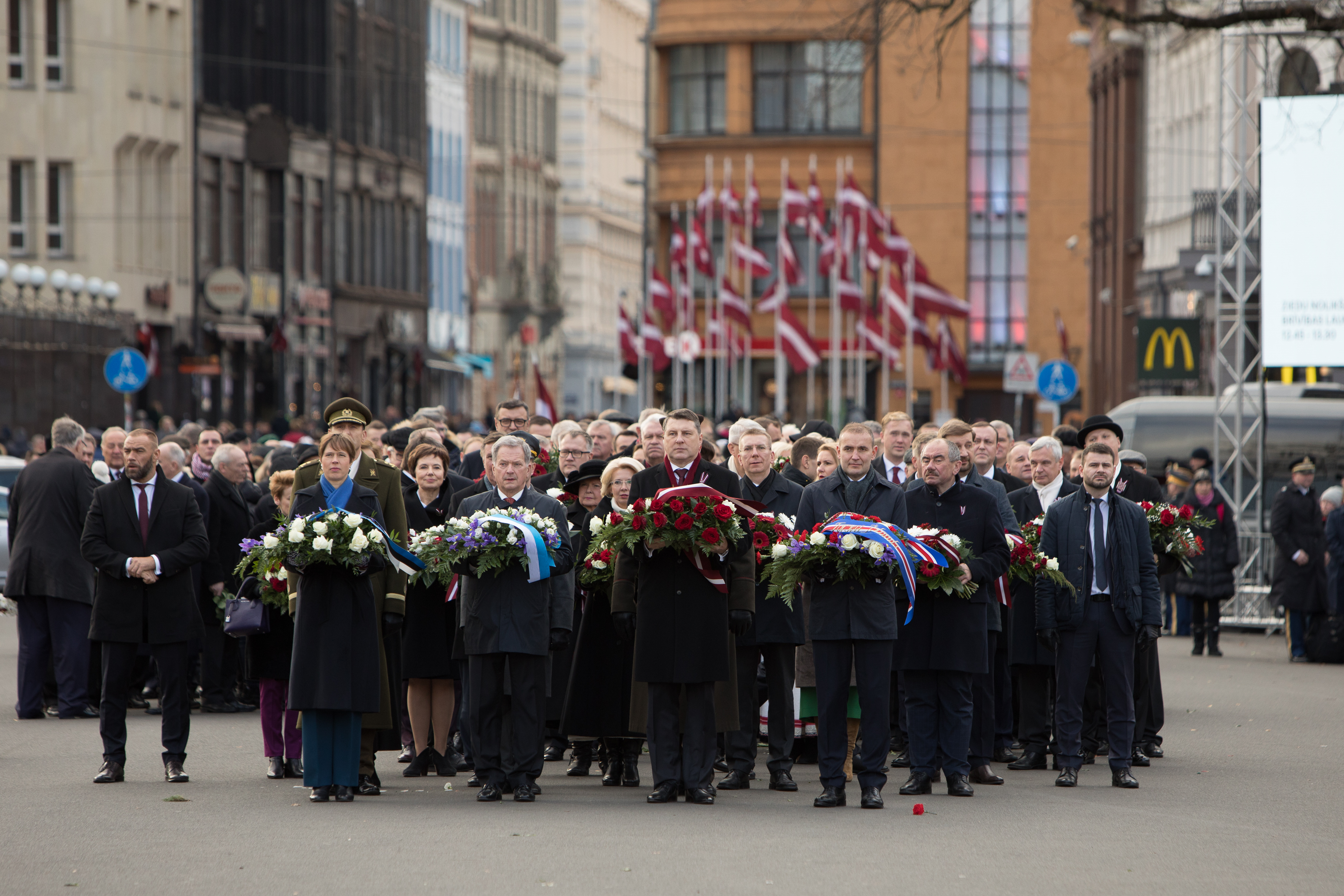
Dignitaries laying wreaths at the Freedom Monument on 18 November 2018

As per the events on its actual centennial anniversary on 18 November 2018, many high-level government officials, dignitaries, military leaders, and public figures laid wreaths and flowers at the Freedom Monument in the capital. A musical concert was held at the Latvian National Theatre, where Latvia declared its sovereignty in 1918. A special meeting of the Saeima was also held at the theatre.

=== Military Parade ===
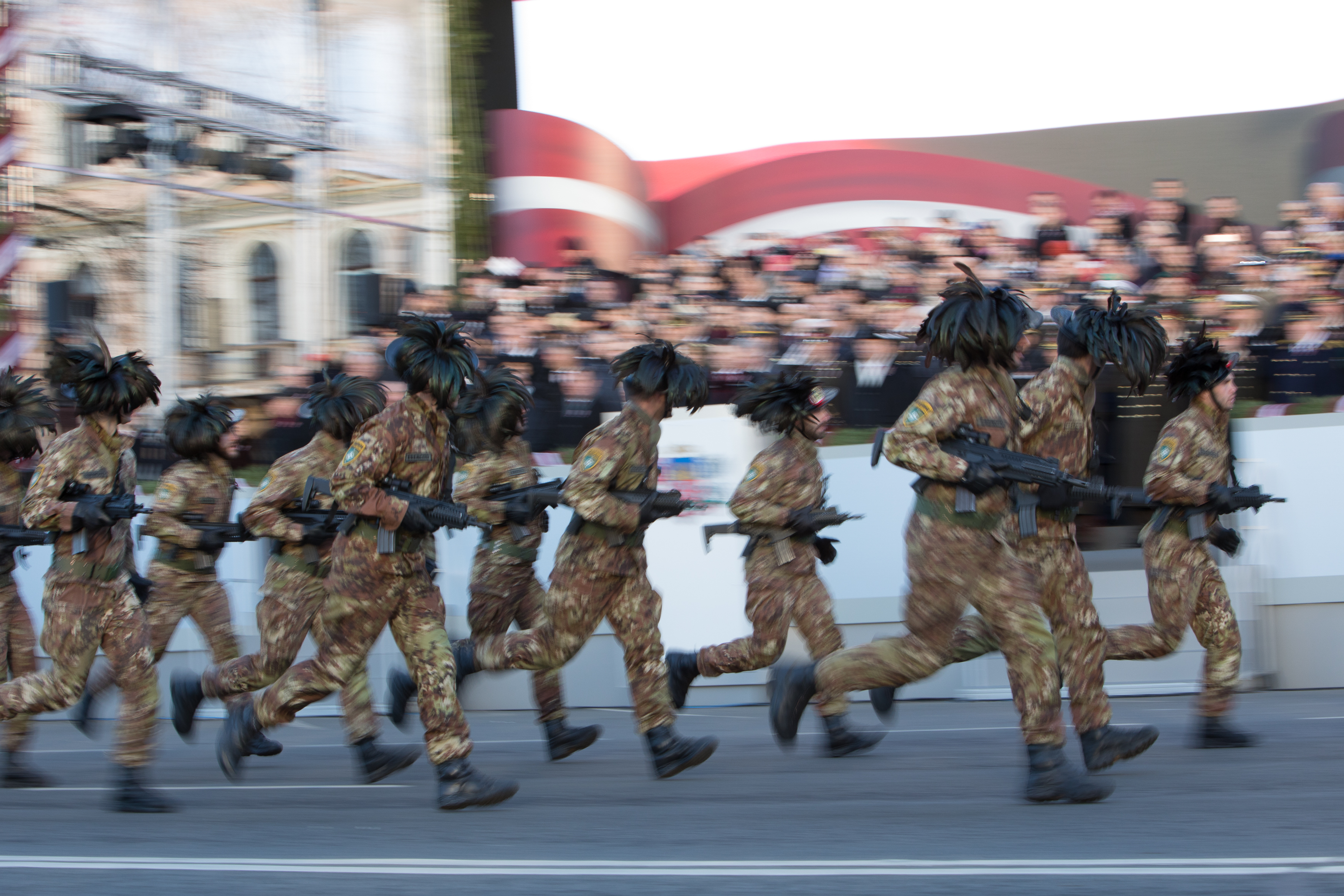
The Italian Bersaglieri marching in the military parade

The annual military parade along the 11. novembra krastmala (November 11th Embankment) in Riga marked one of the main events of the centennial anniversary. It was the largest military parade in Latvian history with around 1,700 soldiers from the Latvian National Armed Forces participating in the march past. It was composed of personnel of the Land Forces, Navy, Air Force, National Guard, Border Guard, Military Police, State Police, State Fire and Rescue Service and military academies. The parade was led by Latvian President Raimonds Vējonis, Chief of the National Defence Forces Leonīds Kalniņš and Naval Forces commander Ingus Vizulis. Estonian President Kersti Kaljulaid and Armed Forces chief Riho Terras, Lithuanian President Dalia Grybauskaitė, Finnish President Sauli Niinistö and Icelandic President Guðni Th. Jóhannesson joined in attending the military parade and the celebrations. The NATO countries and other military partners of Latvia that were represented at the parade were Italy, Estonia, Lithuania, Poland, Romania, the Czech Republic, Finland, Albania, Croatia, the Netherlands, Norway, Slovakia, Spain Slovenia, Britain, Denmark, Sweden, Germany, Canada and the United States.

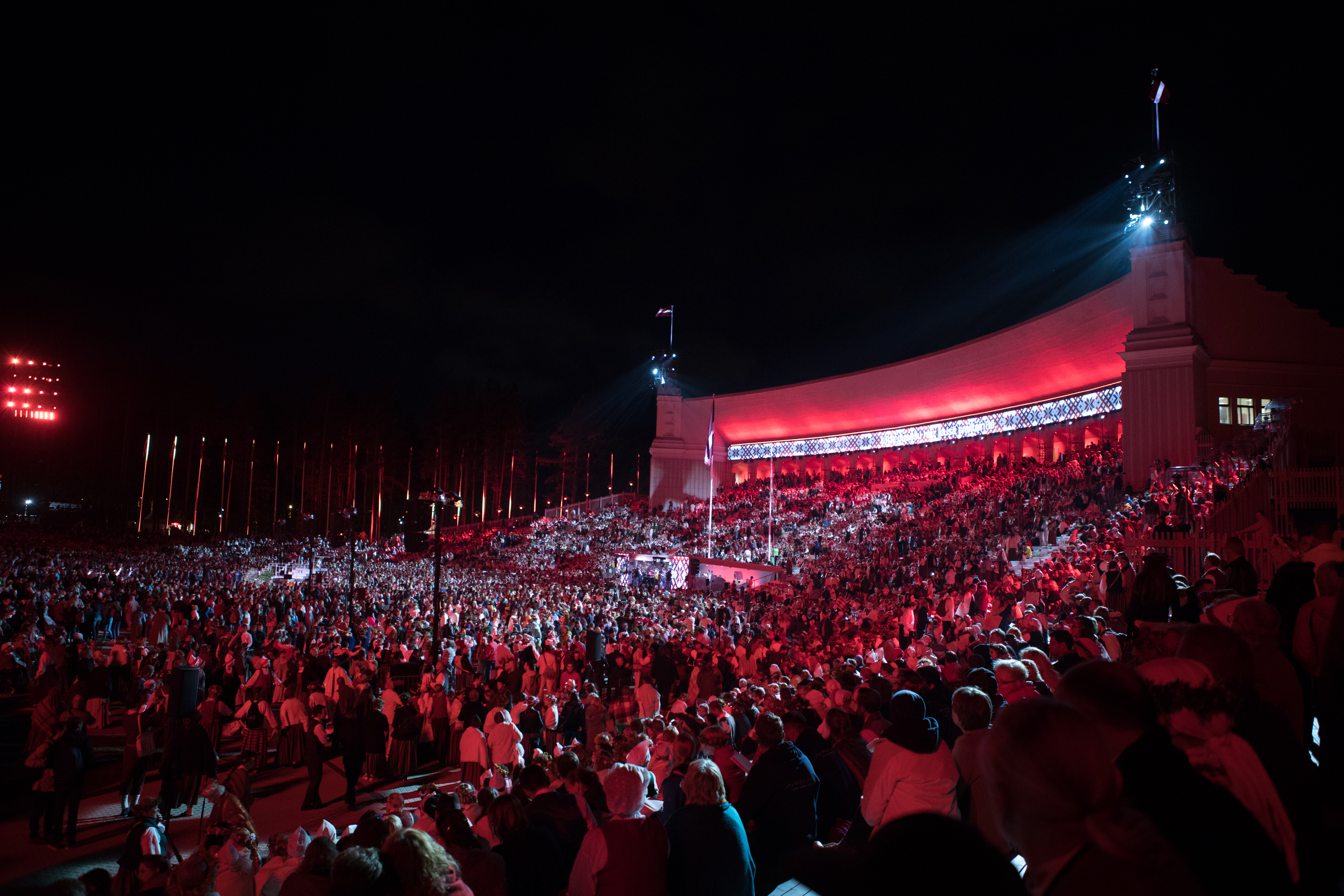
26th Latvian Song and Dance Festival closing concert "On the Starry Path"

=== Latvian Song and Dance Festival ===
The 26th Latvian Song and Dance Festival in early July also touched upon the centenary of the country and used elements of the centenary logo in its design.

=== Closure of the centenary campaign ===
The official closure of the Latvia 100 campaign was marked in December 2021, when the team of the Latvian State Centennial Office of the Ministry of Culture unveiled the book “Latvian State Centennial: A Tale Created and To Be Created By Us”, which covers all five years of the program and was then handed out to all 764 public libraries in Latvia.

== See also ==
- Proclamation Day of the Republic of Latvia
- Public holidays in Latvia
- Lāčplēsis Day
- 90th anniversary of the Latvian Republic
- 100th Anniversary of the Estonian Republic
- Centennial of the Restored State of Lithuania
