= Soviet occupation of Latvia =

Soviet occupation of Latvia can refer to:

- Soviet occupation of Latvia in 1940 (1940-1941)
- Soviet re-occupation of Latvia in 1944
- Latvian Soviet Socialist Republic (1940-1941, 1945-1990)
