= Centennial of the Restored State of Lithuania =

100th anniversary of independence of Lithuania

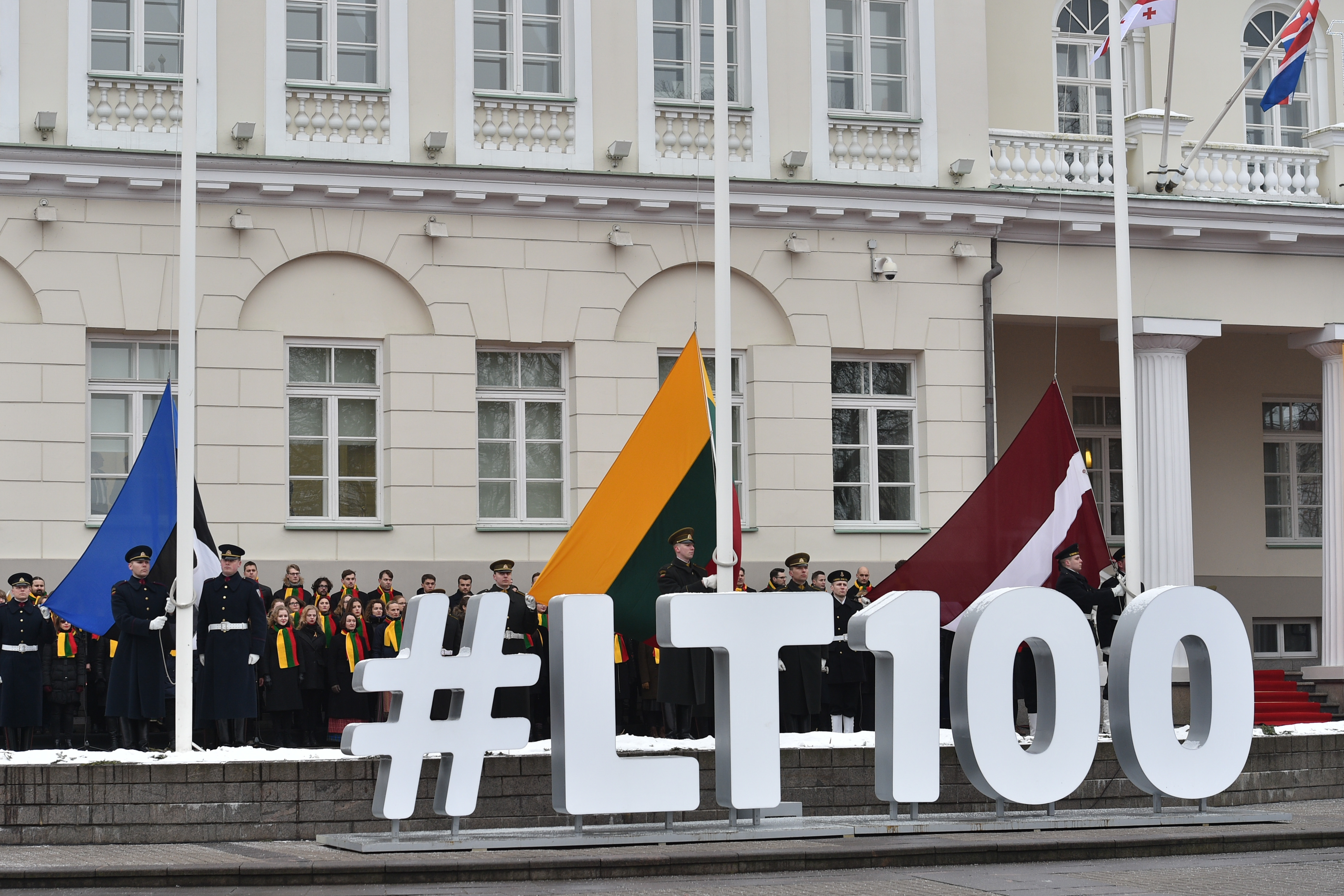
Celebrations of the 100th anniversary of the restoration of statehood

The Centennial of the Restored State of Lithuania marks the 100th anniversary of the Act of Independence of Lithuania which was signed on 16 February 1918.

== Historical background ==
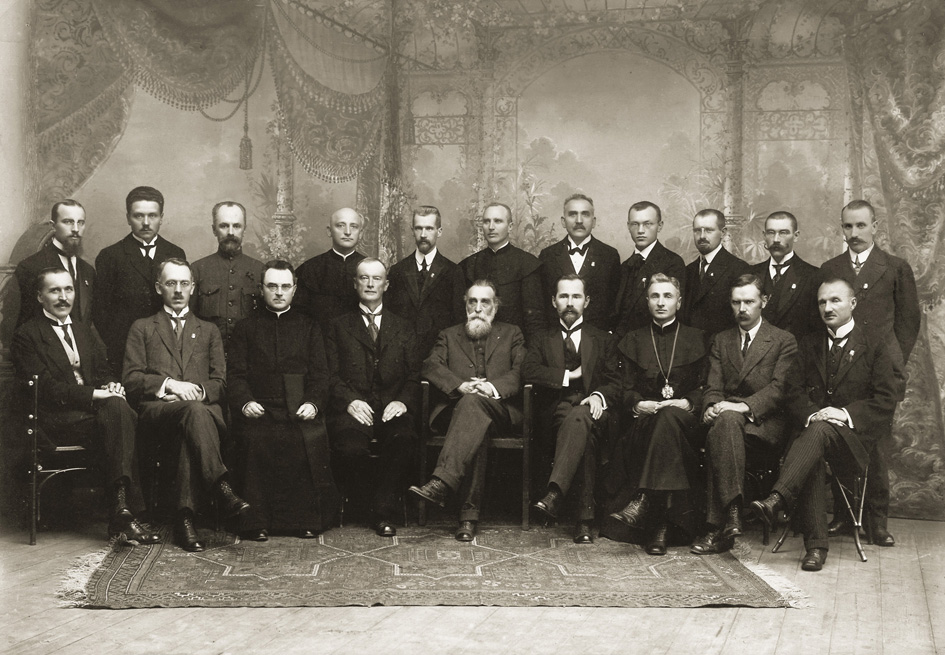
Signatories of the Act of Independence of Lithuania

Lithuania's statehood dates to the 13th-century Grand Duchy of Lithuania. On 6 July 1253, Mindaugas was crowned as the King of Lithuania. In 1385, Lithuania joined Poland in a union that grew into the Polish–Lithuanian Commonwealth by 1569. Between 1772 and 1795, most of Lithuania was annexed by the Russian Empire.

Towards the end of World War I, on 16 February 1918, twenty people signed the Act of Independence of Lithuania, which proclaimed the restoration of an Independent State of Lithuania, creating a modern state. During World War II, Lithuania was forcibly occupied and annexed by the Soviet Union in 1940, followed by Nazi Germany in 1941, and again by the Soviets in 1944 as one of its constituent republics. During the late 1980s and the dissolution of the Soviet Union, Lithuania fought to restore its independence which culminated in the Act of the Re-Establishment of the State of Lithuania signed on 11 March 1990.

== Goal and tasks ==
In order to have every Lithuanian citizen experience the significance of this jubilee, the Government of Lithuania has initiated a celebration of the centenary of the restoration of Lithuania. The intention of the celebration is to:

"Bring... together Lithuanian people and Lithuanians living abroad to celebrate the birthday of restored Lithuania, encouraging to be proud of their country, and becoming important and active participants in Lithuania’s life.

To achieve this, the government has been planning to increase Lithuania's reputation abroad. February 16 has been pronounced as the most important jubilee date, but the Centennial is intended to last all year.

The National Flag and Vytis have been chosen as symbols of the celebration of the centenary.

Three main focuses of activity have been identified by the government:

- Discover – activities aimed at the past and present: an invitation to know the country, its achievements, and heroes.
- Celebrate – activities aimed at the present-day invite the society to meaningfully celebrate on 16 February.
- Create – activities aimed at the future by emphasizing the idea that every person who contributes to the prosperity of Lithuania is an important hero of the Centennial and by encouraging active involvement and participation in creating the present and the future.

== Activities ==
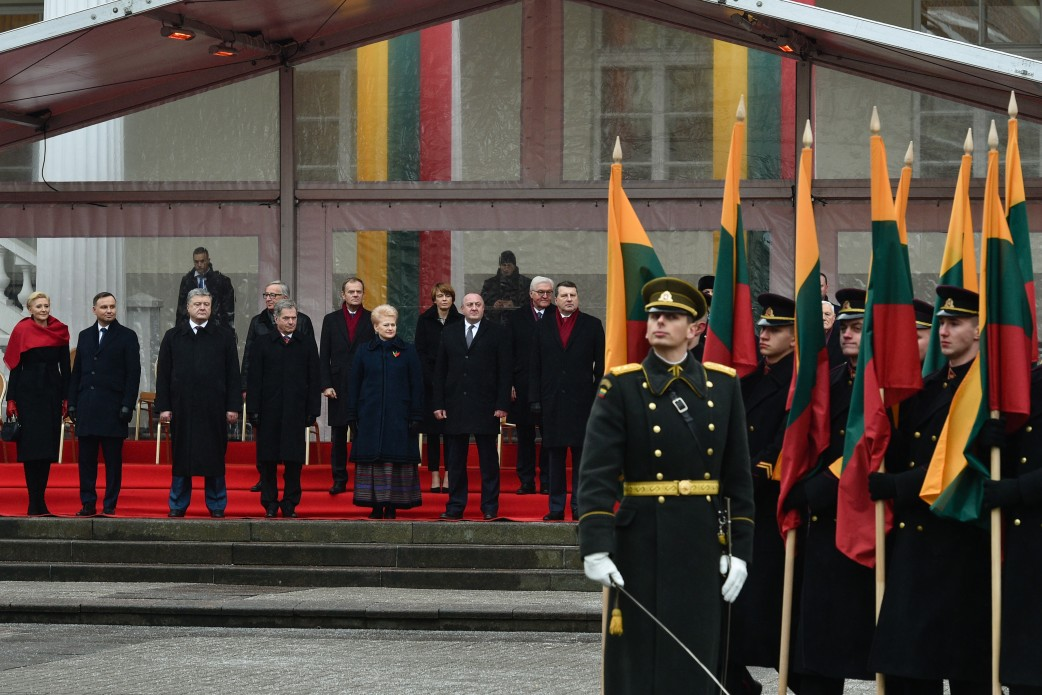

6 July 2017, the Statehood Day, marked the official start of the Centennial. On that day, the national anthem was sung at the same time at 100 Lithuania's hillforts and around the world. The main events of the celebration of the centennial are scheduled for 2018. The most important of them will be the commemoration of the 16 February. The largest event will be the 20th Song Festival "Vardan tos ...," to be held in Vilnius on 30 June – 6 July 2018. The name of the festival comes from Tautiška giesmė, the Lithuanian anthem.

A lot of attention will be given to the presentation of Lithuania and its cultural and scientific achievements abroad. Many smaller initiatives have been already or will be implemented in the near future. The Lithuanian Council for Culture alone has received fifty applications for “The Centennial of the State of Lithuania” program. Hundreds of initiatives have been supported by other cultural and scientific programs and foundations. In 2018, tens of scientific conferences, exhibitions, symposiums, educational programs, concerts, and performances will take place.

== See also ==
- Public holidays in Lithuania
- 100th anniversary of the Latvian Republic
- 100th Anniversary of Estonian Republic
