= Government institutions in Latvia =

This is a list of government and municipal institutions of Latvia and their subordinated institutions with executive powers.

== Main institutions ==
- Latvian Chancery of the President
- Saeima
- Constitutional Court of the Republic of Latvia
- Supreme Court of the Republic of Latvia
- The State Audit Office
- Latvijas Banka
- The Central Election Commission
- Financial and capital market supervision is carried out by Latvijas Banka, following the integration of the Financial and Capital Market Commission into Latvijas Banka in 2023.
- The Ombudsman's Office
- The National Council for Electronic Media
- The Public Utilities Commission

=== Prime Minister's subordinate bodies ===
- Corruption Prevention and Combating Bureau
- Society Integration Foundation
- Coordination Centre of Policy Sectors

== Ministries of the Republic of Latvia ==
=== Ministry of Defence ===
- National Armed Forces
- National Defence Academy
- Recruiting and Youth Guard Centre
- Military Intelligence and Security Service
- Latvian Geospatial Information Agency
- National Defence Military Objects and Procurement Centre
- State Agency "Latvian War Museum"
- Military magazine "Tēvijas Sargs"

=== Ministry of Foreign Affairs ===
- The Latvian Institute

=== Ministry of Economics ===
- Latvian Investment and Development Agency
- The former Tourism Development Agency was merged into the Latvian Investment and Development Agency in 2016.
- Consumer Rights Protection Centre
- The Central Statistical Bureau
- Standardization, Accreditation and Metrology Centre
- Competition Council

=== Ministry of Finance ===
- Treasury of the Republic of Latvia
- Procurement Monitoring Bureau
- Central Finance and Contracting Agency
- Lotteries and Gambling Supervisory Inspection
- State Revenue Service

=== Ministry of the Interior ===
- Latvian State Police
- State Security Service
- The Office of Citizenship and Migration Affairs
- Ministry of the Interior Information Centre
- State Fire and Rescue Service
- Provision State Agency
- Interior Ministry of Health and Sports Center
- Clinic of the Ministry of the Interior
- State Border Guard

=== Ministry of Science and Education ===
- Higher Education Quality Evaluation Center
- State Education Centre
- State Education Quality Service
- State Education Development Agency
- Latvian Academic Information Centre
- Studies and Science Administration
- State Agency "Latvian Language Agency"
- Latvian Council of Science
- Latvian Academy of Sciences
- Social Correction Educational Institution "Naukšēni"
- Youth International Programme Agency
- State Agency "Latvian Sports Museum"
- Murjāņi Sports Gymnasium

=== Ministry of Culture ===
- Latvian National Archives
- State Inspection for Heritage Protection
- The National Film Centre
- Cultural and Intangible Heritage Center

=== Ministry of Welfare ===
- State Labour Inspection
- State Children Rights Protection Inspectorate
- State Social Insurance Agency
- Social Integration State Agency
- Health and Work Expert Physicians' Commission
- National Employment Agency

=== Ministry of Transport ===
- Latvian Civil Aviation Agency
- Transport Accident and Incident Investigation Bureau
- The State Railway Technical Inspectorate
- State Railway Administration
- Maritime Administration of Latvia

=== Ministry of Justice ===
- Constitution Protection Bureau
- State Land Service
- The Register of Enterprises of the Republic of Latvia
- Data State Inspectorate
- The Court Administration
- State Probation Service
- State Forensic Science Bureau
- State Agency "Insolvency Administration"
- Maintenance Guarantee Fund Administration
- Prison Administration
- Patent Office
- State Language Centre
- The Legal Aid Administration

=== Ministry of Environmental Protection and Regional Development ===
- The State Environmental Service
- Nature Protection Board
- State Agency "Latvian Museum of Natural History"
- State Regional Development Agency
- State Environmental Bureau
- State Agency "National Botanic Garden of Latvia"
- Latvian Institute of Aquatic Ecology
- Latvian Environmental Protection Fund Administration

=== Ministry of Health ===
- The National Health Service
- Disease Prevention and Control Center
- Health Inspectorate of Latvia
- State Emergency Medical Service
- State Agency of Medicines
- State Blood Donor Center
- State Forensic Science Bureau
- National Sports Medicine Centre
- Pauls Stradiņš Museum of Medical History
- Riga Stradiņš University

=== Ministry of Agriculture ===
- Rural Support Service
- State Forest Service
- State Plant Protection Service
- State Agency "Agricultural Data Centre"
- Latvian State Institute of Agrarian Economics
- Latvia University of Life Sciences and Technologies
- State Technical Supervision Agency
- Latvian State Institute of Fruit-Growing
- State Stende Cereals Breeding Institute
- State Priekuļi Plant Breeding Institute
- Latvian State Forest Research Institute "Silava"
- National Research Institute of "Food Safety, Animal Health and Environment Research Institute"
- Food and Veterinary Service
