= Law enforcement in Latvia =

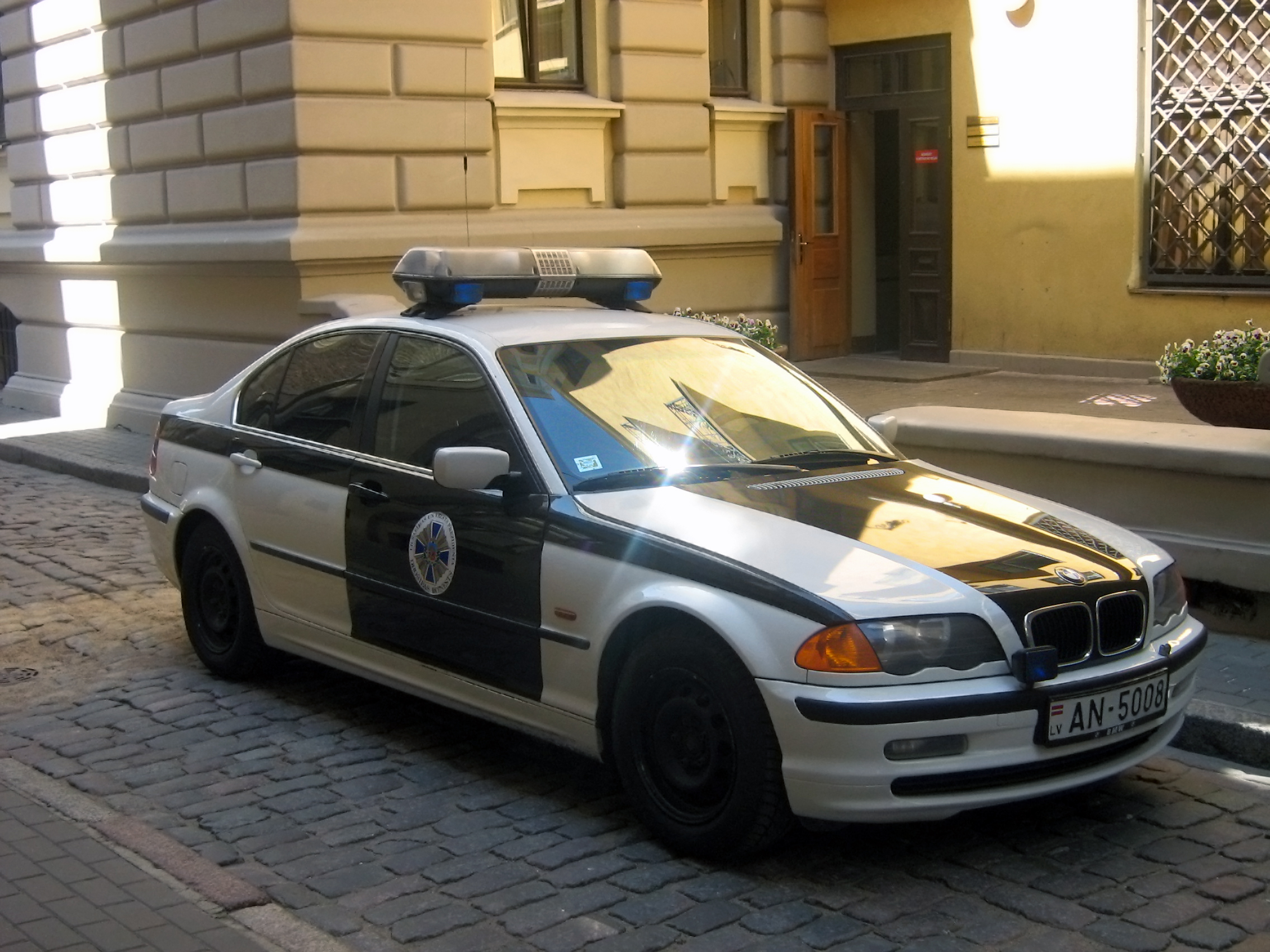
Car of the former Latvian Security Service of Parliament and State President sporting the 1991 standard livery of Latvian police cars

Law enforcement in Latvia is under the jurisdiction of the Ministry of the Interior. The main security organizations are:

- the State Police (VP)
- police forces of the municipalities of Latvia (PP)
- State Border Guard (RS)
- State Security Service (VDD, formerly - Security Police)

In 2003, the State Police consisted of 8,222 officers.

The civilian intelligence agency - Constitution Protection Bureau (SAB) - is directly responsible to the Cabinet of Ministers of Latvia. The military intelligence service - the Defence Intelligence and Security Service (MIDD) - is under the jurisdiction of the Ministry of Defence.

== See also ==
- Corruption Prevention and Combating Bureau
- Latvian Military Police of the National Armed Forces
