= State Police (Latvia) =

State Police of Latvia Latvijas Valsts policija
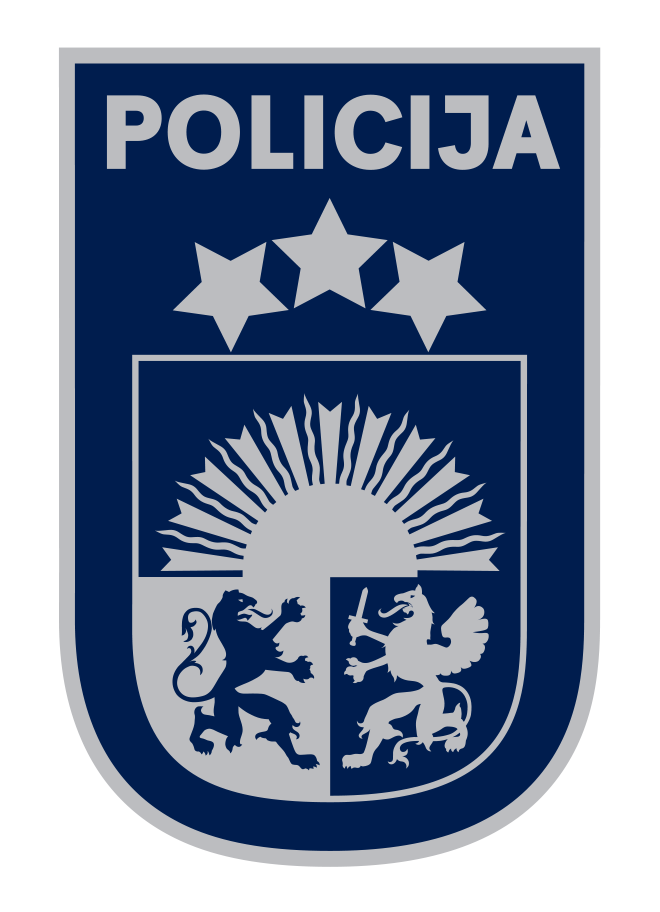
- Service patch (since 2018)

Agency overview
- Formed: 5 December 1918
- Employees: 6371 (2021)
- Annual budget: €132.64 million (2021)

Jurisdictional structure
- Operations jurisdiction: Latvia
- General nature: Civilian police

Operational structure
- Headquarters: Čiekurkalna 1. līnija 1, k-4, LV-1026, Riga
- Agency executive: Gen. Armands Ruks, Chief of the State Police
- Parent agency: Ministry of the Interior of the Republic of Latvia

Website
- www.vp.gov.lv

The State Police of Latvia (also Latvian State Police, Latvian: Latvijas Valsts policija) is the national police service and one of the national law enforcement agencies of the Republic of Latvia. It is subordinate to the Ministry of the Interior. The agency is divided into five Regional Administrations (Riga, Kurzeme, Latgale, Vidzeme, Zemgale). Since the 13th of October 2020, the Chief of the State Police is General Armands Ruks.

== History ==
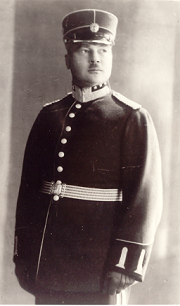
A Latvian policeman in 1931

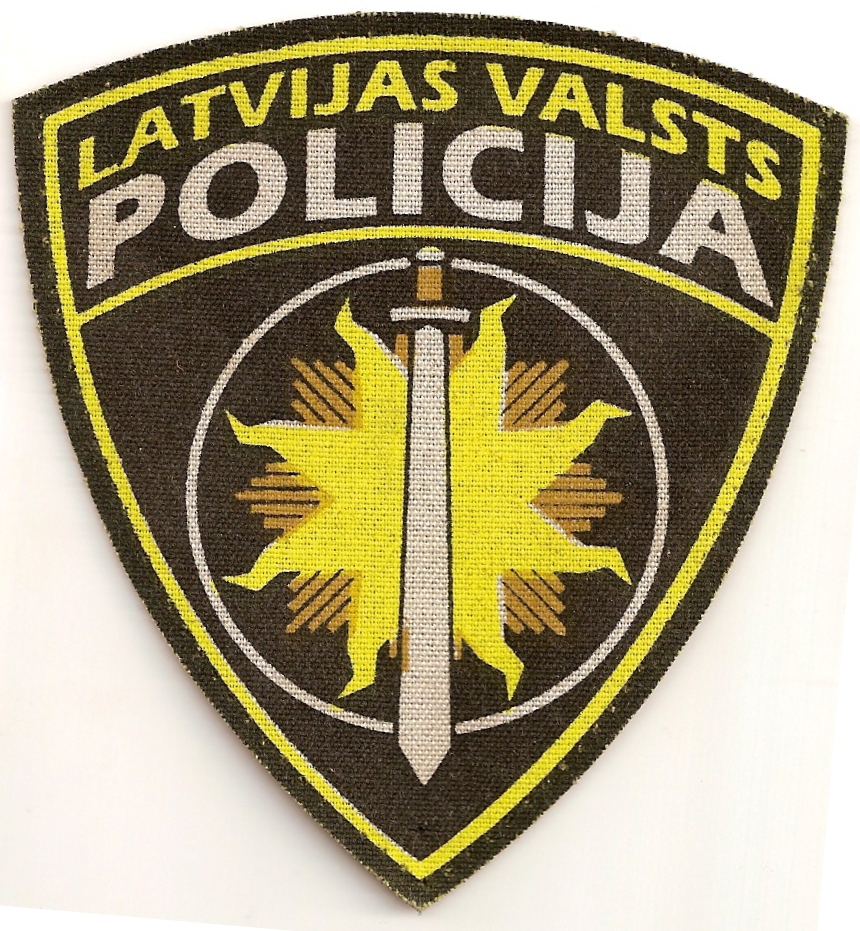
Previous patch (1991/1992–2018, phaseout until 2024)

The founding date of the Latvian Police is considered to be December 5th, 1918, when the transitional government of the newly-proclaimed Republic of Latvia, the People's Council of Latvia, approved the Temporary Regulations on the Internal Security Organization (Pagaidu noteikumi par iekšējās apsardzības organizēšanu), which regulated the structure of the police force and put it under the jurisdiction of the Ministry of the Interior of Latvia, led by Miķelis Valters. The date is now commemorated in Latvia as the Day of the Police.

Due to the ongoing Latvian War of Independence and the lack of territory controlled by Latvian forces at that time, the force could only begin its activities in the summer of 1919 after the Latvian Army and its allies had liberated large parts of the country from the Red Army and the West Russian Volunteer Army. Facing a lack of qualified personnel, the Police School at the Riga Prefecture was opened in the same year.

After the war, the force was further divided into the Civil (Kārtības policija), Criminal (Kriminālpolicija) and Secret Police (Politiskā policija). Latvia became a member of Interpol in 1929. After the Soviet occupation of Latvia in 1940, the police force was dissolved and around 600 former servicemen and their relatives were persecuted. Under the Soviet regime law enforcement in the Latvian SSR was primarily the task of the Soviet Militsiya.

After the restoration of the independence of Latvia, the Latvian Police was re-established on 4 June 1991 with the approval of the law "On Police". One of its first units was the 1st Police (Patrol) Battalion, established on April 30, 1991. The main task of the battalion, which was one of the first armed formations of the Latvian government, was to provide security of the Supreme Council of Latvia and strategically important buildings (government offices, radio and television broadcasting infrastructure). In 1992, the battalion was renamed as the Security Service of the Republic of Latvia (Latvijas Republikas Drošības dienests), which was merged into the Military Police in 2010. Latvia re-joined Interpol on 4 November 1992.

== Organization ==
The agency is led by the Chief of the State Police, General Armands Ruks.

The previous police chief Ints Ķuzis, incumbent since the 2nd of August 2011, resigned on 20 February 2020 to run as a candidate for the 2020 Riga City Council election, later he died in 2022, after a long battle with pancreatic cancer.

Currently the organization employs 6371 personnel and receives €133 million annual funding.

=== Qualification for service ===
For a person to qualify for service at the State Police of Latvia, they must initially complete the 2.5 year full-time or 3 year part-time first level professional higher education programme "State Police Junior Inspector" at the State Police College.

There are 4 specializations available: investigator, public policeman, criminal policeman and crime expert. The candidate selection is based on a number of physical, cognitive, memory, communication and psychological tests.

A candidate must be a Latvian citizen between 18 and 40 years of age with a secondary education certificate and not have committed any intentional crimes for a successful application.

A number of further education programmes are available.

=== Structure ===
The main large organizational units are as follows

- Main Administration Unit
- Regional Units
  - Courland Region Division
  - Semigallia Region Division
  - Latgale Region Division
  - Vidzeme Region Division
  - Riga Region Division
- Public Order Unit
  - Coordination and Control Division
  - Special Object Security Division
  - Traffic Control Division
  - Prevention Division
- Criminal Police Unit (supervises the Omega special operations unit)
  - International Cooperation Division
  - Organized Crime Division
  - Economic Crime Division
  - Criminal Intelligence Division
  - Criminal Investigations Division
- Human Resources Unit
- Internal Control Office
- Special Matters Unit
- Secrecy Unit

OMEGA official seal

OMEGA (Latvian: Pretterorisma vienība "Omega") is the premier counter-terrorism and hostage response unit of Latvia, part of the State Police. Founded in 1992, OMEGA cooperates with many other counter-terrorism units over the world.

=== Ranks ===
The Latvian police ranks are the same as in any of the agencies subordinate to the Ministry of the Interior. The General rank is assigned by the Cabinet of Ministers of the Republic of Latvia, while the Second Lieutenant, First Lieutenant, Captain, Major, Lieutenant Colonel and Colonel ranks are assigned by the Interior Minister.

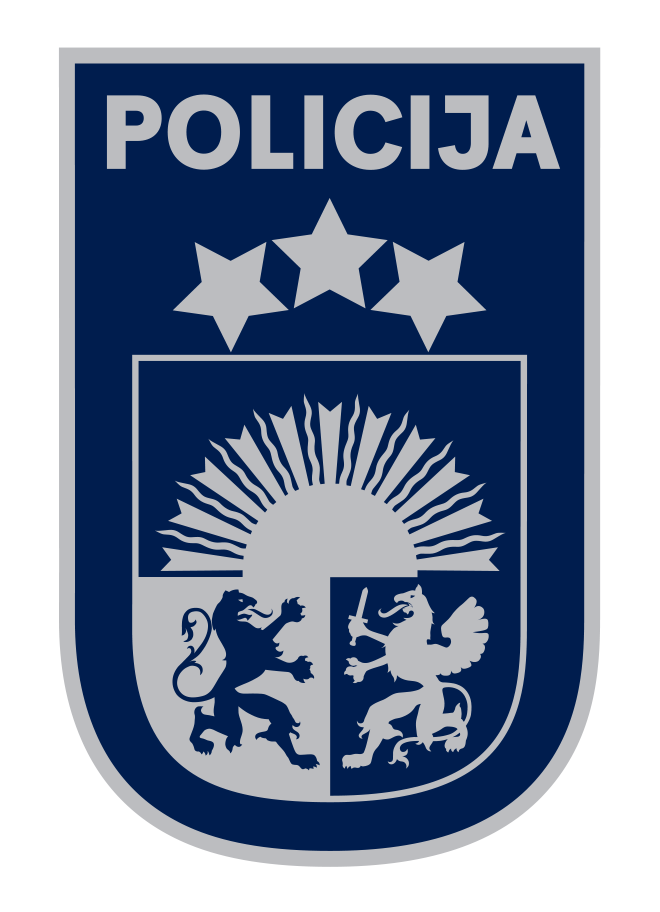
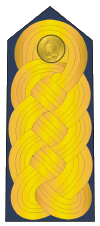
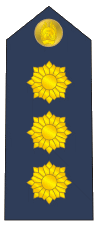
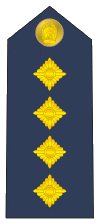
Rank group	Top level service	Higher police service			Elevated police service			Student	Middle police service			Simple service
	Policijas ģenerālis	Policijas pulkvedis	Policijas pulkvežleitnants	Policijas majors	Policijas kapteinis	Policijas virsleitnants	Policijas leitnants	Policijas kursants	Policijas virsnieka vietnieks	Policijas virsseržants	Policijas seržants	Policijas kaprālis	Policijas ierindnieks

== Equipment ==
=== Uniform ===
In June 2018, while celebrating its 100th anniversary, the Police unveiled its new visual identity: a new, pre-WWII-style logo based on the lesser coat of arms of Latvia and new livery with blue, lime green and grey elements inspired by a Latvian folk ornament, the Brush of Māra (Māras slotiņa).

The new design was designed by a group of students and professors from the Art Academy of Latvia and is scheduled to replace the old one starting from 2020.

New uniforms to gradually replace the old all-blue kit were also presented later the same year. The old uniforms are planned to be phased out by 1 July 2024.

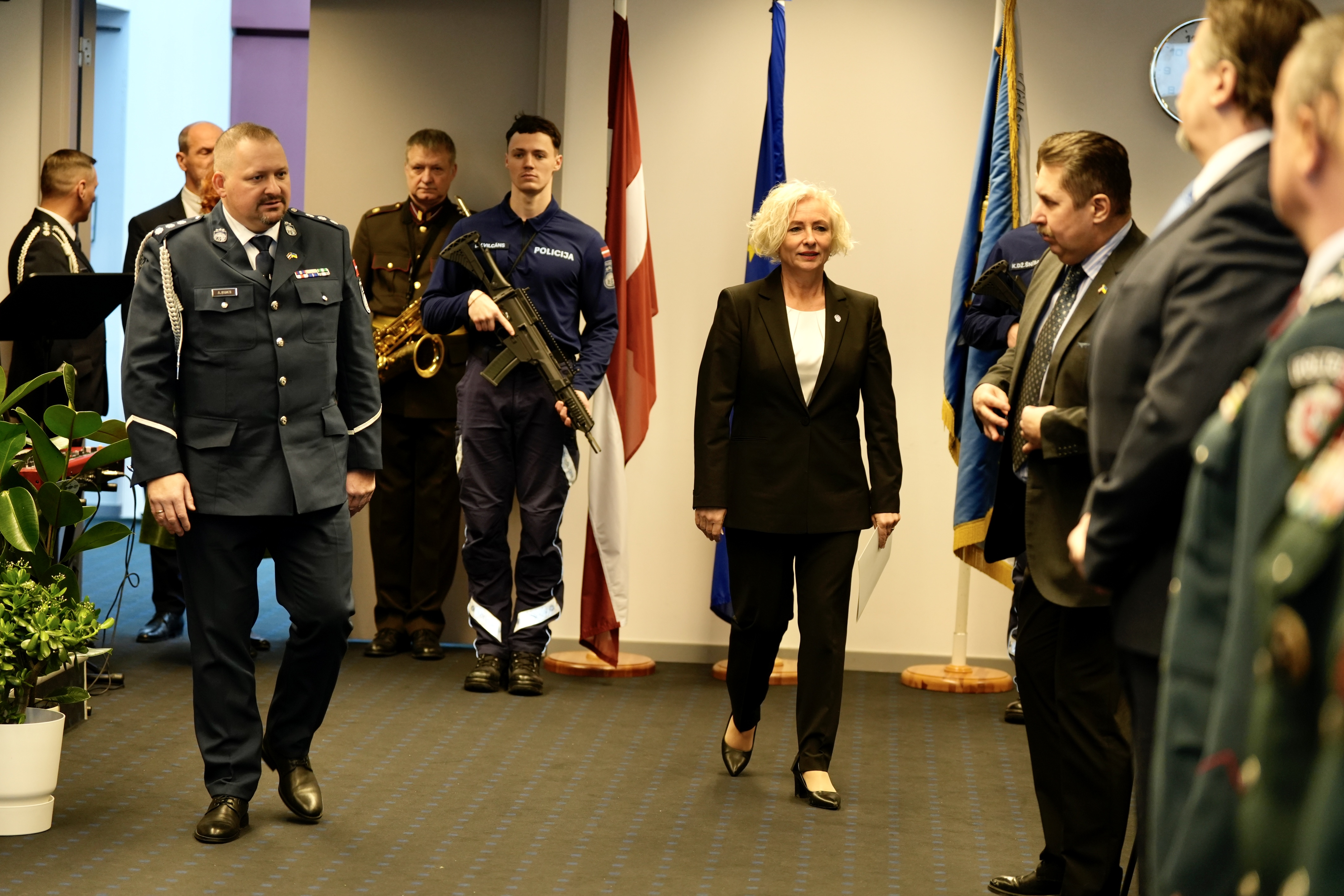
State Police Chief Armands Ruks in an officer dress uniform (left), a color guard officer in patrol dress (middle) accompany the Speaker of the Saeima, Daiga Mieriņa (right). Both officers wear 2018 pattern uniforms.

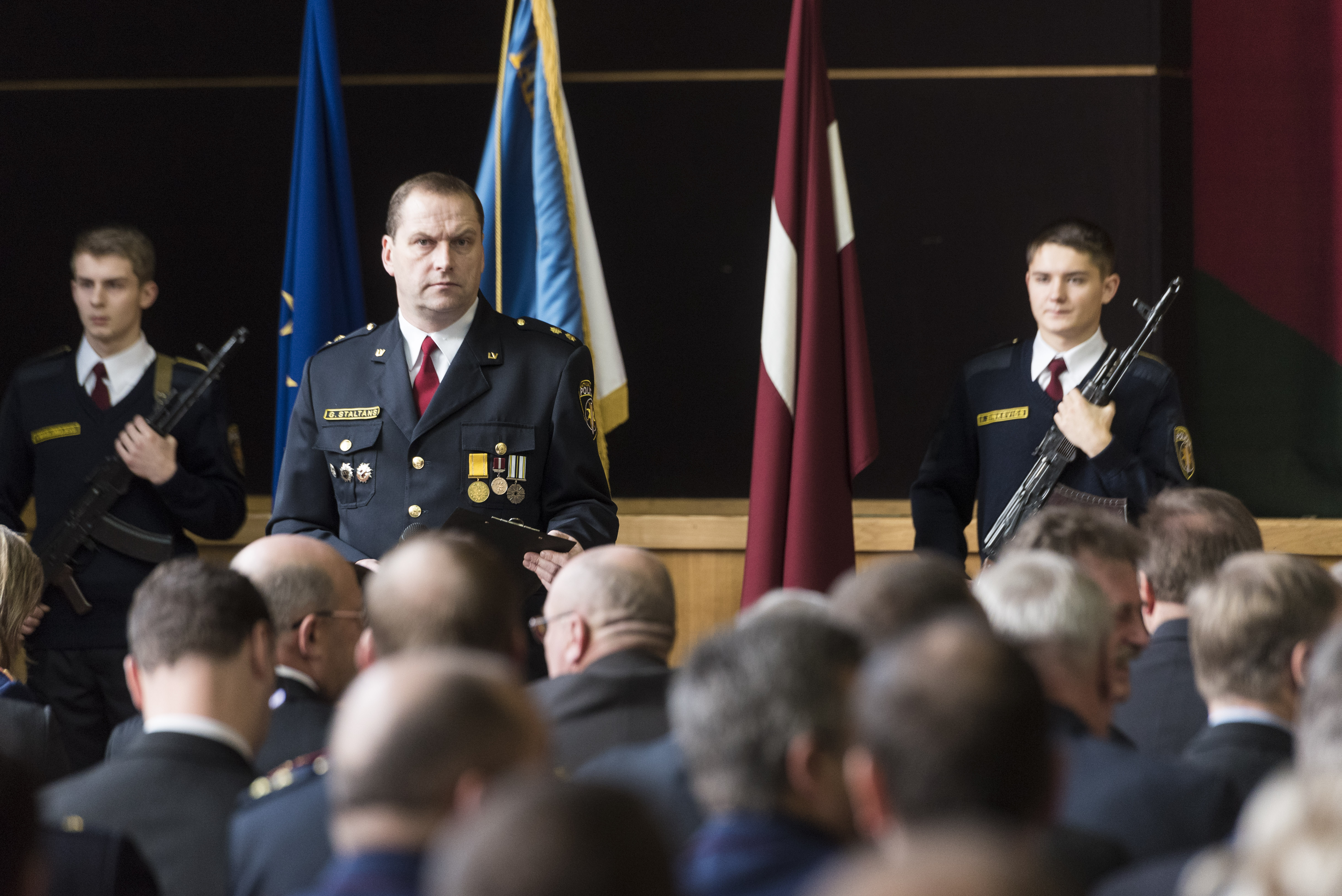
A Latvian police Lieutenant Colonel in the 1992 pattern formal dress uniform, flanked by two officers in work dress sweaters, 2015

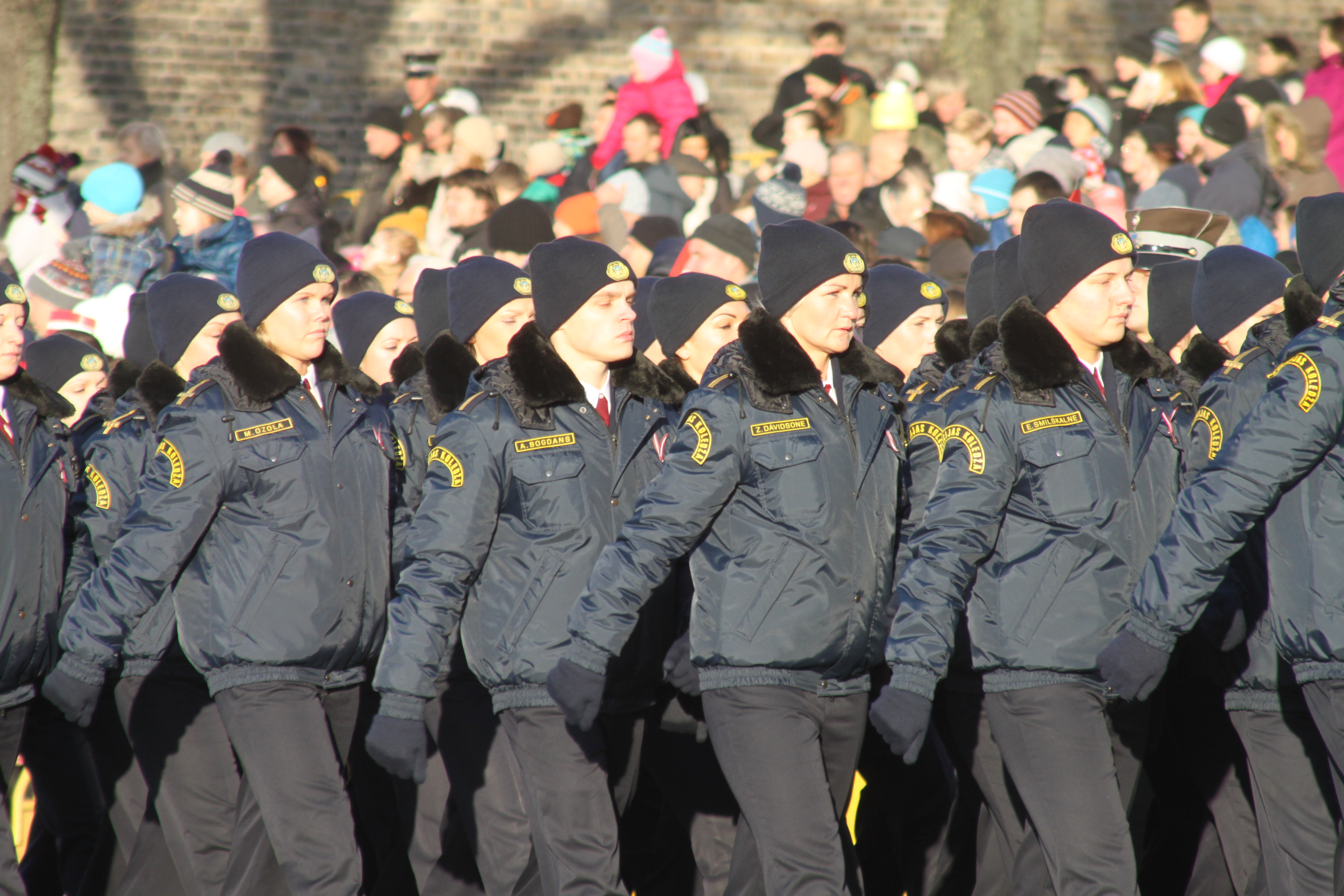
Latvian Police College cadets on parade, 2014

=== Small arms ===
While the precise weapons arsenal of the State Police of Latvia is not known, according to the weapons procurement of the Ministry of Interior, some of the weapons they use together with the State Secret Police and Border Guard are the following:

Model	Type	Origin	Notes
Glock 17	Semi-automatic pistol	Austria	Standard issue
Glock 19	Semi-automatic pistol	Austria	Standard issue
Glock 26	Semi-automatic pistol	Austria	Standard issue
Walther P99	Semi-automatic pistol	Germany	Used by OMEGA
Heckler & Koch MP5	Submachine gun	Germany	Used by OMEGA
Heckler & Koch UMP	Submachine gun	Germany	
Heckler & Koch G36	Assault rifle	Germany	Used by OMEGA
AXMC	Sniper rifle	United Kingdom	
Heckler & Koch G28	Sniper rifle	Germany	

=== Vehicles ===
The State Police of Latvia in the last 5 years replaced most of its vehicles with the following:

- Renault Trafic and Renault Kangoo,
- Škoda Octavia and Škoda Superb,
- Opel Mokka and Opel Insignia,
- Volkswagen Amarok,
- Yamaha FJR1300,
- Subaru Forester,
- Citroen Jumpy,

Some of the Škoda vehicles used for traffic policing are unmarked.

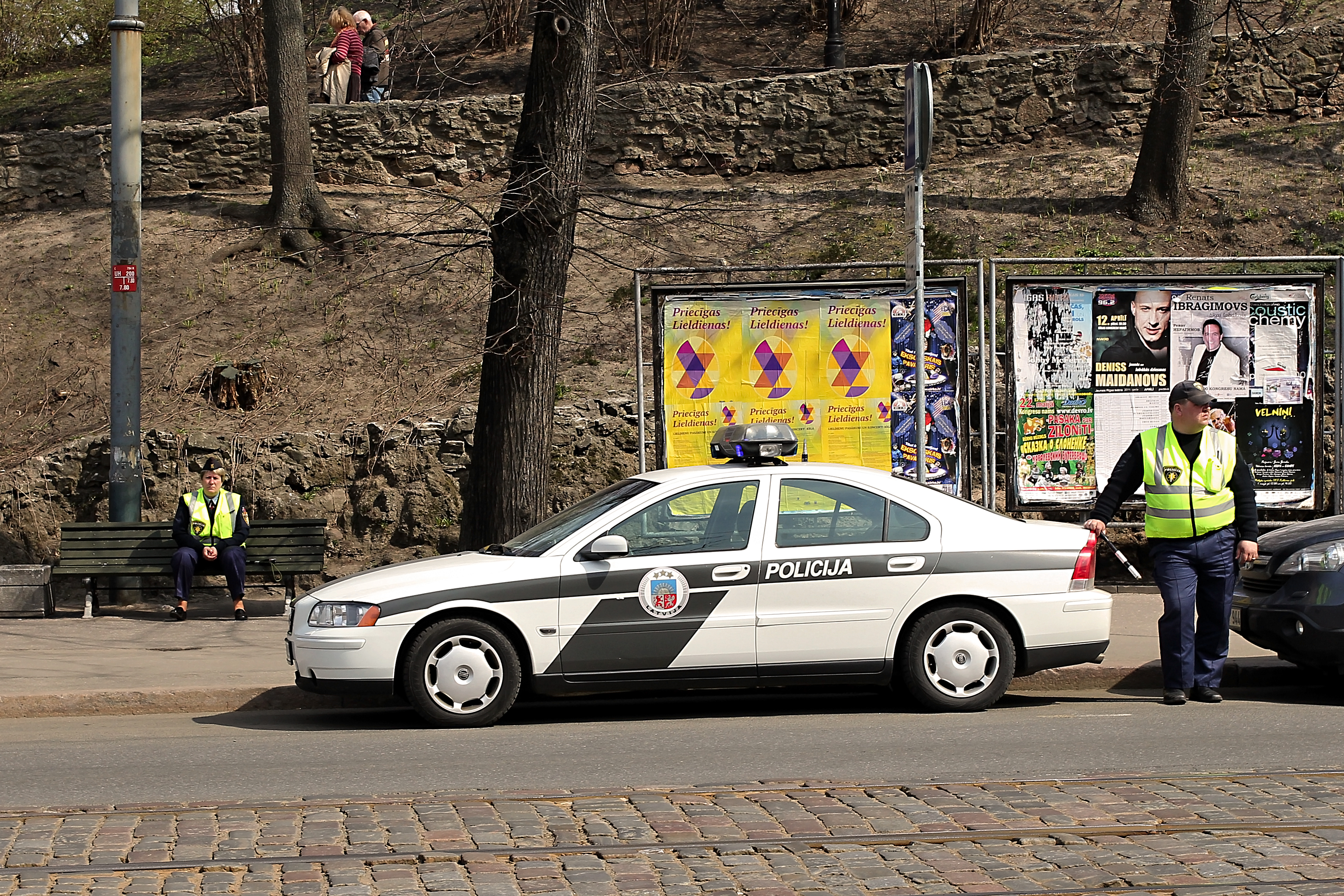
A Volvo S60 patrol car in 1991 livery and officers in Riga, 2011

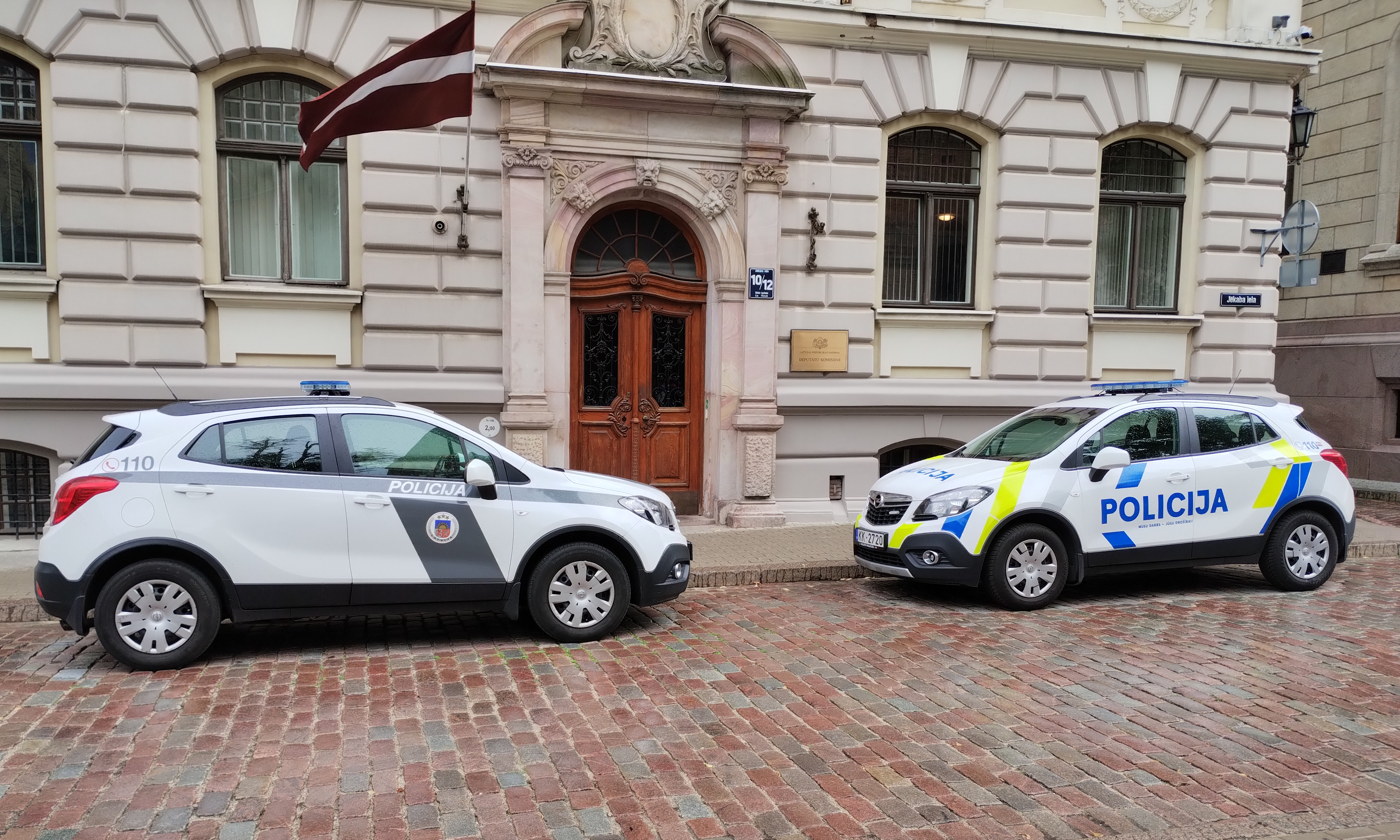
A police Opel Mokka in the old (left) and new livery, 2023

=== Uniform and vehicle design ===
In 1991, the Latvian State Police first adopted a grey-white vehicle livery, which was designed by Gunārs Glūdiņš, a former professor of the Art Academy of Latvia. The design took inspiration from American police and military vehicles, with the first iteration of the design also including stripes in red. A similar white-red version was adopted by the State Fire and Rescue Service, a green-white - by municipal police forces and an early grey-white - by the Security Service of Parliament and State President, as well as other services.

== See also ==
- Law enforcement in Latvia
- Policijas FK, a former football club associated with Latvian police
- Latvian Military Police
- State Border Guard
