= Capital Handling =

Company based in Riga, Latvia

Capital Handling Riga is a fixed-base operator certified by the Latvian Civil Aviation Authority and active in all three Baltic states, with the main focus being on Riga International Airport. Established in 2012, Capital Handling operates out of the Business Aviation Terminal located on the northern part of the Riga International Airport. Two heated hangars and MRO facilities are provided for mostly business aviation operators, but also commercial airlines.

== History ==
In 2006, the predecessor company to Capital Handling purchased a building previously used by DHL Latvia at the airport to launch the FBO facilities.

In 2010, the first business aviation terminal and hangar in the Baltics opened. Until today, the facilities in Riga are the only ones in the three Baltic countries. In the first year of operation, the company managed to attract several business jet operators and the first jets were based in Riga.

Also in 2010, Lufthansa Bombardier Aviation GmbH entered an agreement to use the hangar facilities as a maintenance base for Learjet, Challenger and Global business aircraft.

In 2012, Capital Handling Riga was launched as a separate entity for the handling of business aircraft and as owner of the Business Aviation Terminal facilities. In the same year, Capital Handling Riga was approved by the Latvian CAA, joined the EBAA and received support from the Latvian investment agency LIAA as well as from the EU Structural funds.

In December 2013, an additional heated hangar was built, able to accommodate business jets for storage and maintenance.

Capital Handling joined in 2016 the newly formed Latvian Aviation Association (LAA) and announced further partnerships.

In 2017, Capital Handling was appointed as the official representative of Russian commercial airline Rusline, performing handling for the daily flights to Moscow Domodedovo.

== Services ==
The company offers assistance to business jets and passengers, such as:

- VIP passenger services through Business Aviation Terminal, separated from the main terminal building
- Limousine, hotel and catering services
- Fuel services
- De-icing services
- Ground handling support equipment
- Customs and immigration
- Worldwide flight support services for business jets
- VIP lounges and crew lounges
- Concierge services
- Weather information
- Line and base maintenance
- Air taxi and air charter sales
- Scheduled or nonscheduled air carrier services and support services
- Aircraft storage and hangar parking

== Maintenance ==
Capital Handling owns two heated hangars and provides line and base maintenance for several types of aircraft. Approvals have been obtained from international authorities, such as the EASA, as well as authorities in Bermuda, Guernsey, Russia and San Marino.
