= Masļenki border incident =

1940 Soviet attack on Latvia

- Part of Soviet occupation of Latvia in 1940
Date	June 15th, 1940; 83 years ago
Location	Masļenki, Augšpils Parish, Latvia 56.9678°N 28.0719°E
Result	Soviet occupation

Belligerents
Latvia	USSR

Units involved
(Latvia) Border Guard Brigade	(Soviet Union) NKVD

The Masļenki border incident (Latvian: Masļenku robežincidents) was an attack by Soviet NKVD troops on 15 June 1940 against the Latvian border posts in the district of Abrene at the then Latvian–Soviet border on the eve of the Soviet occupation of Latvia.

The incident in fact consisted of three separate nearly simultaneously launched attacks on Latvian border posts by Soviet forces at the early dawn of June 15, 1940. Two border posts were actually attacked while another already ongoing attack was suspended. As a result, 3 border guards and 2 civilians were killed; 37 were kidnapped and brought to the Soviet Union.

== Background ==
Before the occupation in 1940, Latvia's border with the USSR was 352 km long. Already since 1920, various military structures had been formed for its protection. The most recent, dating from 1935, was the Border Guard Brigade, of which three battalions - the 1st Dagda, the 2nd Zilupe and the 3rd Abrene Battalion - were stationed along the border. Each battalion was divided into 4 companies, 12 platoons, 36 patrols and 12 reserve patrols. Each patrol guarded a section of the border approximately 3,2 km long.

Shortly before the occupation of Latvia by the Red Army on June 17, 1940, Soviet Special Forces units carried out previously planned acts of provocation on Estonian and Latvian territory. At dawn on June 15, there were attacks on three border patrols of the Third Abrene Battalion. One of them - the 2nd patrol of the 1st Company showed resistance and eventually three border guards and two civilians were killed, patrol building burned and many others brought to the Soviet Union as hostages.

== Soviet attacks on Latvian border guards on June 15, 1940 ==
The Soviets attacked two Latvian border outposts on June 15, 1940 and called off an additional planned attack. The most notorious attack was on Masļenki border post at 02:30, which resulted in death of 3 border guards and 2 civilians and facilities burnt down, as well as several persons being kidnapped. Several persons who were either kidnapped or left behind were wounded. Another attack occurred on Šmaiļi border post at 3:00, which resulted in the kidnapping of border guards and civilians, including inhabitants of near-by homes. Children as young as 1 year were taken. A third attack on Žuguri border post was called off when the NKVD realized that they were spotted.

== Attack at Masļenki ==
At 2:30 am June 15, 1940, 25 NKVD commandos managed to cross the Ludza river, which demarcated the Soviet-Latvian border unnoticed. They surrounded the patrol on all sides. The neighboring house of guard Žanis Krieviņš and local farmer Dmitrijs Maslovs were surrounded as well. The attackers most likely intended to capture the patrol post without firing shots because hand grenade packets were placed all around guardhouse except at the front door. Attack was first uncovered by patrol guard Jānis Macītis who acted according to supplementary instructions and hailed at the attackers. One of the attackers shot a round from his automatic rifle at the patrol guard. After the first shots, the attackers realised that they had been discovered and changed their combat plans for destroying the guard post and shooting all the border guards. Jānis Macītis, despite being seriously injured, tried to reach the guard house. However, not far from the guard house he stepped on a hand grenade which tore off his left foot.

Another guard, Pēteris Cimoška, was in the blind. Although visibility was near zero due to the thick fog, Cimoška also opened fire since he understood that the Soviet border guards were attacking. However, after the first shots, the attackers pinpointed the blind's location and tried to surround it. While firing, Cimoška retreated in the direction of the guard house where he heard acting commander of the patrol Valdis Grīnvalds defending the house with separate shots. Arriving at the house Cimoška stepped on one of the grenade packets and was torn to pieces. Later, when the burning building collapsed, his body was charred.

At the guard house were the acting commander of the patrol Valdis Grīnvalds, the guard Kārlis Beizaks who was off duty and resting, the wife of the guard and patrol commander Fridrihs Puriņš (who was not there during the attack), Hermīne Puriņa, and her 14-years-old son Voldemārs. Grīnvalds was the only one who returned fire through a window, but visibility was poor and he could shoot only in the direction of attackers without direct aim. Beizaks had apparently decided to leave the building and attempt to run to the first patrol for help because the telephone communications were down. He jumped out the window but was able to cover only 199 meters when he was shot by attackers. Since there was still resistance from the guardhouse, the attackers threw in firebombs and inside of the building caught fire. Hermīne Puriņa was shot 8 meters away from the house after escaping through a window. Her son Voldemārs was shot in the abdomen but managed to hide in the woodpile. The building's only defender Grīnvalds also left the burning building soon after. Throwing away his rifle, he jumped out the window and jumped in the Ludza river unscathed. There he was captured by Soviet border guards.

On June 15, the government of Latvia started an investigation of the attacks and army units together with border guard were put on high alert. A general mobilization and resistance could be expected however due to the presence of the Soviet military bases in Latvia since fall 1939 such a move was practically impossible.

At Masļenki, three border guards (Jānis Macītis, Pēteris Cimoška, Kārlis Beizaks) and two civilians (Hermīne Puriņa née. Kalniņa who was the wife of a border guard and Voldemārs Puriņš who was the 14-year-old son of a border guard) were killed by NKVD troops.

== Kidnappees ==
In both Masļenki and Smaili, in total, 37 persons were kidnapped by attacking Soviet troops and brought to the Soviet Union, of whom ten were border guards and the rest were civilians, including women and small children (as young as one and two years old). 36 of the kidnapped were returned by Soviets on July 7, 1940, and the farmer Dmitrijs Maslovs was executed in the spring of 1942, accused of espionage.

== See also ==
- Soviet OMON assaults on Lithuanian border posts
