= Transport Accident and Incident Investigation Bureau =

Latvia government agency

The Transport Accident and Incident Investigation Bureau (TAIIB; Latvian: Transporta nelaimes gadījumu un incidentu izmeklēšanas birojs) is a government agency of Latvia that investigates transport accidents and incidents. It has its head office in Riga. It is functionally independent of the Latvian Civil Aviation Agency. The agency is under the direct supervision of the Minister of Transport and has been so since its creation.

== History ==
On 21 December 2005 the Latvian cabinet passed Order Nr.822, which called for establishing an aviation accident investigation agency. The agency was established on 1 January 2006 as the Aircraft Accident and Incident Investigation Bureau of the Republic of Latvia (AAIIB, Latvian: Latvijas Republikas Aviācijas nelaimes gadījumu un incidentu izmeklēšanas birojs). Due to the 12 December 2006 cabinet order No. 953 "On the serious railway accident investigation institution," beginning on 1 April 2007 the agency began investigating accidents and incidents involving railways. Due to the increased responsibilities, on 1 July 2007 the agency's name changed to its current name. Beginning on 1 June 2011 the agency began investigating maritime accidents and incidents, in accordance with Section 8.1 of the Maritime Administration and Marine Safety Law and Article 14 Transitional Provisions of the same law. Previously the Maritime Administration of Latvia (MAL) investigated maritime accidents and incidents.
