= State Security Service (Latvia) =

Latvian civil counterintelligence and internal security service

- Valsts drošības dienests
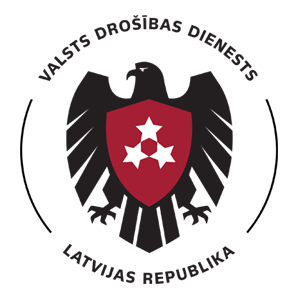

Agency overview
- Formed: 25 August 1919 (restored 26 March 1990)
- Jurisdiction: Government of Latvia
- Headquarters: Brīvības gatve 207, Riga, Latvia
- Website: vdd.gov.lv

The State Security Service or VDD (Latvian: Valsts drošības dienests) is one of three Latvian security and intelligence services. VDD is the civilian counterintelligence and internal security service, which gathers intelligence from a number of sources and conducts its analysis, informs senior state officials about the identified risks to national security as well as acting to neutralize those risks.

VDD's competence is counterintelligence, protection of state secrets, protection of the constitutional order, economic security, counterterrorism as well as dignitary protection. Among the three Latvian security and intelligence services VDD is the only one authorized to conduct pre-trial investigation (initiate criminal proceedings and refer the case for launching criminal prosecution as well as detain persons).

The oversight of VDD's activities is conducted by the Minister for the Interior, the Prosecutor General's Office performs the oversight of VDD's conduct of operational measures and the legitimacy of the pre-trial investigation process, while the parliamentary control over VDD is exercised by the National Security Commission of the Saeima.

In terms of its mission, functions and tasks VDD is the successor to the State Security Department of Latvia (established in 1919) - the first civilian counterintelligence and internal security service of Latvia.

== History of VDD ==
=== State Security Department ===
Established on 11 August 1919, the State Security Department (Latvian: Valsts drošības departaments) was the first Latvian civilian counterintelligence and internal security service, which was founded in the midst of the ongoing Latvian War of Independence.

The headquarters of the department were located at 12 Suvorova Str. (nowadays - Krišjāņa Barona iela) in Riga. On 3 September 1919 First Lieutenant Jānis Liģeris-Liggers (1889–1942) was appointed the Head of the State Security Department.

The main task of the department was to fight crimes against the state and monitor political security. The functions of the department and the Internal Intelligence Division of the Latvian Army were overlapping in many aspects. Due to this, the department was dissolved on 1 November 1919.

=== The 5th (Political) Section of Riga Criminal Police ===
Following the dissolution of the State Security Department, its functions were overtaken by the Internal Intelligence Division of the Army. Most of the State Security Department's officers continued their careers there as well.

The department was succeeded by the 5th (Political) Section of Riga Criminal Police (Rīgas Kriminālpolicijas 5. (Politiskā) nodaļa) was established. It conducted measures to eliminate the groups of saboteurs established by the enemy which were trying to hinder the further development of the nascent country and the work of the interim government led by Kārlis Ulmanis. In parallel the officers of the Political Section continued working on the cases initiated by the State Security Department.

=== Political Security Department ===
Less than two months after the signature of the Latvian – Soviet Peace Treaty on 11 August 1920, which basically ended the War of Independence, the Political Security Department (Politiskā apsardzība) was established. Active warfare in Latvia has ceased and the nature of threats towards national security changed. For this reason, the functions of the Political Section of the Criminal Police and the Internal intelligence division of the Army were merged into the Political Security Department.

On 22 October 1920 Captain Voldemārs Alps (1891–1964) was appointed the first Head of Political Security Department and served until his replacement in 1922 by Pēteris Martinsons (born in 1886, year of death unknown). However, also P.Martinsons held the post of the Head of Political Security Department for a short period. On 15 March 1923 Jānis Kaktiņš (born in 1892, year of death unknown) was appointed the Acting Head and exercised his functions for almost four months until on 3 July 1923 Ernests Āboltiņš (1884–1942) became the Head of Political Security Department.

Despite the formal peace, the newly-established Latvia had to fight against various foreign influence activities. The Political Security Department had to conduct counterintelligence measures in order to protect Latvia's national interests against political and economic espionage by Soviet Russia and to prevent it from conducting subversion operations in Latvia. The main threats to Latvia's national security at that time were posed by the various organisations of the underground Latvian Communist Party, which actively incited for rebels and tried to destabilise internal political life. The officers of the Political Security Department counteracted to these communist organisations and succeeded in neutralising a part of them.

=== Political Department ===
In April 1924 the Political Security Department was renamed the Political Office (or Political Department, Latvian: Politiskā pārvalde, Politpārvalde), whose task was to "detect and prosecute crimes directed against the democratic state and its security".

On 16 July 1924 Voldemārs Ozoliņš (1891–1941) was appointed as department head and held the post for the next ten years - until April 1934. The Political Department consisted of an investigation unit, an intelligence collection unit and six regional units. Ozoliņš started his service in the Political Department on 11 June 1923 as an investigation officer, but after just two months on 11 August was appointed the Acting Supervisor of Riga district. In 1927 V.Ozoliņš was awarded the Third Class Order of the Three Stars and the Order of the White Rose of Finland.

On 20 April 1934 Jānis Frīdrihs Valentīns Fridrihsons (J. F. V. Skrauja since 1939, 1892–1941) was appointed the Head of Political Department - this happened right before the coup of Kārlis Ulmanis. The main challenges towards Latvia's national security remained unchanged - the subversion operations of the USSR, as well as limiting the activities of communists, fascists and other political extremists.

In the summer of 1940 when Latvia was occupied by the USSR, almost all the officers of the Political Department were executed. The Soviet repressive institutions deemed the service in the Political Department to be an especially serious 'crime'. After the occupation of Latvia Ozoliņš was arrested and deported to a Gulag in Russia where on 25 February 1942 Ozoliņš was shot.

=== Information Department ===
After the restoration of Latvia's independence in 1990 it became necessary to establish a new Latvian state security system. Its founding milestones were the modern principles about the place and role of intelligence and counterintelligence services in a democratic society. In November 1991 the Information Department of the Ministry of Interior (LR IeM Informācijas departaments) was established - it performed the foreign intelligence and counterintelligence tasks. The first Head of the department was Juris Kuzins (1947–1992).

=== National Economic Sovereignty Protection Department ===
In February 1993 the Information Department was merged with the Government Protection Service (Valdības apsardzes dienests) and the National Economic Sovereignty Protection Department (Valsts ekonomiskās suverenitātes aizsardzības departaments, VESAD) was established. It was tasked with such functions as foreign intelligence, counterintelligence, fight against terrorism and other serious crimes, and dignitary protection. Raimonds Rožkalns (b. 1957) was appointed to lead the department.

=== Security Police ===
In 1994 the Law on State Security Institutions was adopted. In the same year the National Economic Sovereignty Protection Department was reorganised and the Security Police (Drošības policija, DP) was established.

On 27 December 1994 the regulation of DP was adopted and it tasked DP to organise and conduct foreign intelligence, counterintelligence and other measures in order to prevent or neutralize activities aimed at violent overthrowing of constitutional order or posing other threats to state security, as well as dignitary protection.

In 1995 the Constitution Protection Bureau (SAB) was established. In 2000 DP handed to SAB the foreign intelligence functions, while in 2003 - a part of the counterintelligence functions.

As a reaction to the global threats posed by the international terrorism, in 2005 the Counterterrorism Centre was established within DP to coordinate counterterrorism measures in Latvia.

On 8 July 1994 Raimonds Rožkalns was appointed the first head of service and held the post until 14 November 1996. On 18 December 1996 Jānis Apelis (1942–2014) was appointed head of service and held the post until 25 August 1999, when Imants Jānis Bekešs (b. 1960) was appointed to the post for the following three months. From 21 December 1999 until 7 November 2014 the head of service was Jānis Reiniks (b. 1960). On 8 November 2014 the current head of service was appointed - Normunds Mežviets (b. 1973).

== Functions of VDD ==
With the amendments to the Law on State Security Institutions that were adopted in 2018, since 1 January 2019 the former DP is now called the Latvian State Security Service.

Currently within VDD's remits is counterintelligence and protection of state secrets, protection of the constitutional order, economic security, coordination of counterterrorism measures as well as dignitary protection. Among the three Latvian security and intelligence services only VDD is authorised to conduct the pre-trial investigation (initiate criminal proceedings and refer the case for launching criminal prosecution as well as detain persons).

=== Counterintelligence ===
One of VDD's main responsibilities is counterintelligence. The aim of the counterintelligence measures is to identify and prevent the activities of foreign intelligence and security services aimed against the independence of the Republic of Latvia, the scientific, technical and military potential of the State, the interests of national security and other areas of vital importance to the State.

VDD systematically conducts briefings for state and municipal officials to raise awareness about hostile actors and other intelligence risks. To ensure counterintelligence measures VDD closely cooperates with two other Latvian security and intelligence services as well as foreign partner services.

=== Protection of state secrets ===
The protection of state secrets consists of various measures aimed at retaining state secrets and preventing their illegal dissemination, disclosure or usage.

VDD issues second (up to Secret) and third (up to Confidential) category security clearances for access to state secrets to the most part of state and municipal officials whose professional activities require such access. If necessary, VDD provides support in vetting persons for the first category (up to Top Secret) security clearances issuance (first category security clearances are issued by SAB).

VDD organises control over the requirements for handling classified information in the state institutions within VDD's remit and consults on ensuring the protection of state secrets and handling of classified information.

=== Protection of the constitutional order ===
One of VDD's main tasks is the protection of the constitutional order of the State. It is ensured by implementing a number of measures aimed at preventing any attempts to unlawfully change the General Provisions set in the Constitution of Latvia - the State independence, sovereignty, democracy and territorial integrity.

Activities against the constitutional order are undertaken by extremist organisations, groups of persons or individuals. The declared or real aims of these actors is to use various methods, including violence, to attain the changing of the democratic polity, separation of particular regions from the Republic of Latvia of the joining of the Republic of Latvia to another country. These actors may act upon their own initiative or following the tasks of other countries or extremist organisations.

=== Economic security ===
VDD also works in the field of economic security, especially considering the growing impact of economic developments on the national security and the attempts of particular foreign countries to use economic instruments to foster their geopolitical interests.

The task of VDD is to identify and prevent the activities aimed at obtaining control over companies of significance to national economy or domains, if the real aim of such activities is not only commercial activities and profits, but also to establish political influence positions to foster interests of foreign countries. To ensure economic security it is also crucial to identify and terminate the functioning of such businesses which are tasked by foreign intelligence and security services.

The stability of the finance sector plays a tremendous role in economic security, therefore to ensure the development and sustainability of national economy it is important to identify and prevent the risks related to the financial reputation of the State.

=== Counterterrorism ===
Identification and prevention of terrorism threats is a significant line of action for VDD. VDD conducts operational activities in order to obtain pre-emptive information regarding the possible terrorist activities and to timely prevent them. To identify and neutralize terrorism risks VDD closely cooperates with foreign partner services and regularly exchanges information and analysis.

In parallel to operational activities, terrorism threat analysis and implementation of preventative measures VDD also coordinates the activities of state and municipal institutions as well as other legal entities within the counterterrorism domain. Among preventative measures there is also the travel control of persons originating from terrorism risk countries, regular inspections of critical infrastructure and mass gathering sites, providing recommendations for improving the physical security of these objects and educational activities for their employees.

VDD has elaborated the National Counterterrorism Plan and response plans for various terrorist threat scenarios. In cooperation with other institutions VDD regularly holds counterterrorism exercises.

=== Dignitary protection ===
VDD is in charge of protection of the Prime Minister and the Speaker of the Saeima. The protection of the President of Latvia is provided by the Military Police. However the Cabinet of Ministers or the Presidium of the Saeima may decide to assign other dignitaries for protection. VDD also ensures the protection of officials facing sudden threats.

In addition to protecting Latvia's senior officials VDD is also ensuring the security of heads of foreign states and governments, their ministers of foreign affairs, leaders of the UN, Council of the EU, European Parliament and European Commission during their visits to Latvia. Following the suggestion of the Ministry of Foreign Affairs or the Chancellery of the Saeima protection may be provided also during the visits of other foreign officials or representatives of foreign and international organisations and institutions.

=== Pre-trial investigation ===
Among the three Latvian security and intelligence services only VDD is authorised to conduct pre-trial investigation. VDD investigates crimes committed against the State or within security and intelligence services. VDD can investigate other crimes should they fall within VDD's remit or be assigned to VDD by the Prosecutor General.

== See also ==
- Estonian Foreign Intelligence Service
- State Security Department of Lithuania
- Constitution Protection Bureau
