= Janis Kazocins =

Retired British Army officer and Latvian national security consultant

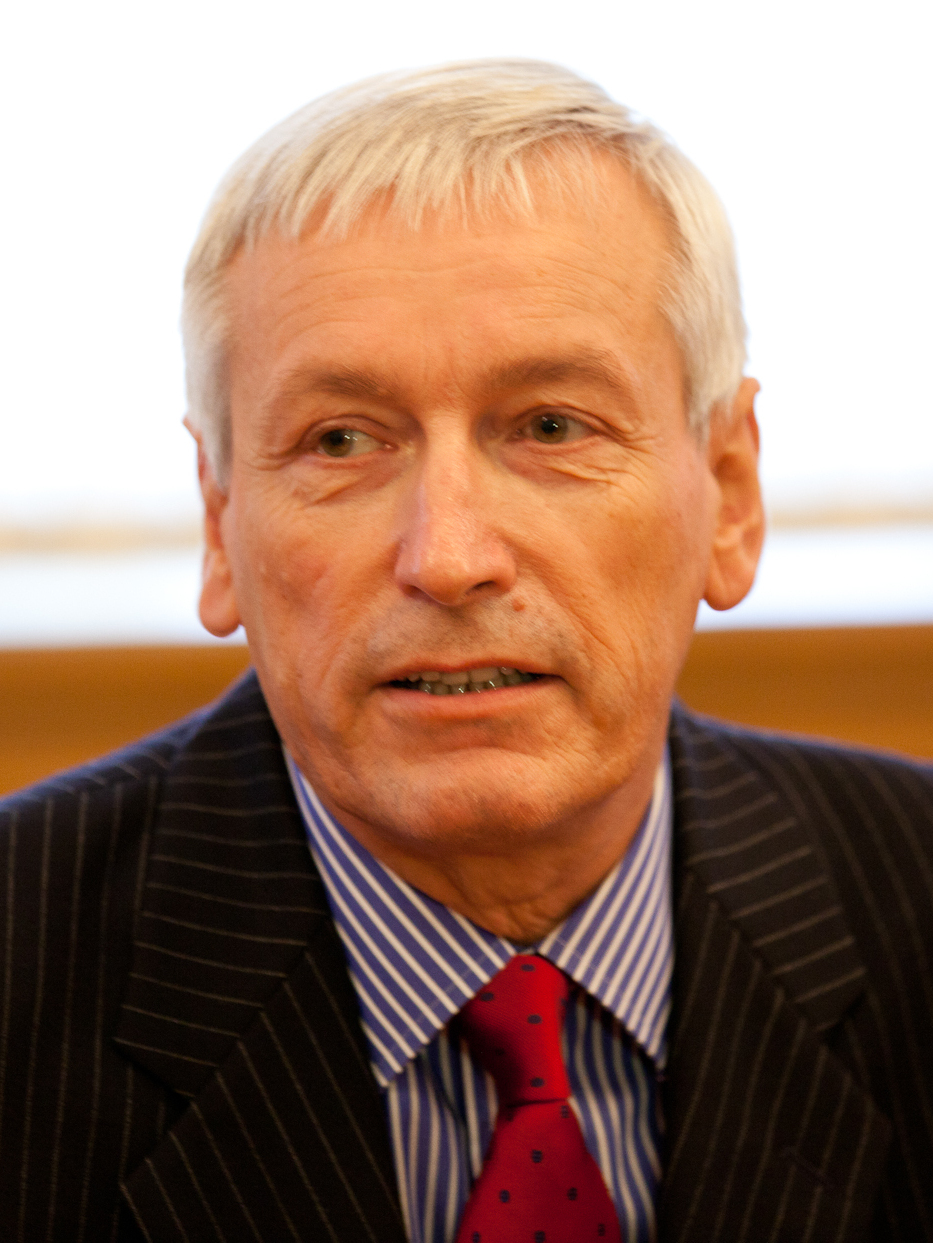
Kažociņš in 2011

Brigadier Janis Kazocins OBE (Latvian: Jānis Kažociņš; born 11 May 1951, Peterborough, United Kingdom) is a former British Army officer and Latvian intelligence agency director.

In 1972 Kazocins received a bachelor's degree in philosophy at the University of Nottingham. In 1973 he graduated from the Royal Military Academy Sandhurst and joined the Royal Artillery.

Kazocins served in Northern Ireland during The Troubles. He participated in the planning of Operation Granby, the British component of the 1991 Gulf War. Kazocins was made an officer of the Military Division of the Order of the British Empire in 1991; at the time he was a Lieutenant Colonel.

Between 1994 and 1995 Kazocins was based in Riga, as the first British military attaché to Latvia, Lithuania and Estonia. Kazocins was seconded to the Latvian National Armed Forces from 1995 to 1997 and retired from the British Army in 2002.

Kazocins became a Latvian citizen in 2003. From 2003 to May 2013 Kazocins was director of the Satversmes aizsardzības birojs (SAB; the Constitution Protection Bureau), Latvia's external intelligence service. In 2013 he was awarded Latvia's Cross of Recognition.

From June 2013 Kazocins was an adviser to Defense Minister Artis Pabriks on international security and information technology.

In December 2013 Kazocins was appointed to lead the Public Commission for the assessment of the Zolitūde shopping centre roof collapse, but on 18 December resigned from the commission.

== Sources ==
- "Warriors of the three armies", Latvian Television, 90 mins.
