= Maritime Administration of Latvia =

Government agency of Latvia that oversees maritime affairs

The Maritime Administration of Latvia (MAL, Latvian: Latvijas Jūras administrācija) is a government agency of Latvia that oversees maritime affairs. Its head office is in Riga.

The agency was established in 1994. It is subordinate to the Ministry of Transport.

Previously the Marine Accidents Investigation Division of the MAL investigated marine accidents and incidents. Beginning on 1 June 2011 the Transport Accident and Incident Investigation Bureau began investigating maritime accidents and incidents.
