= Ministry of Transport (Latvia) =

Government ministry of Latvia

Republic of Latvia Ministry of Transport
- Latvijas Republikas Satiksmes ministrija
- Coat of arms of Latvia

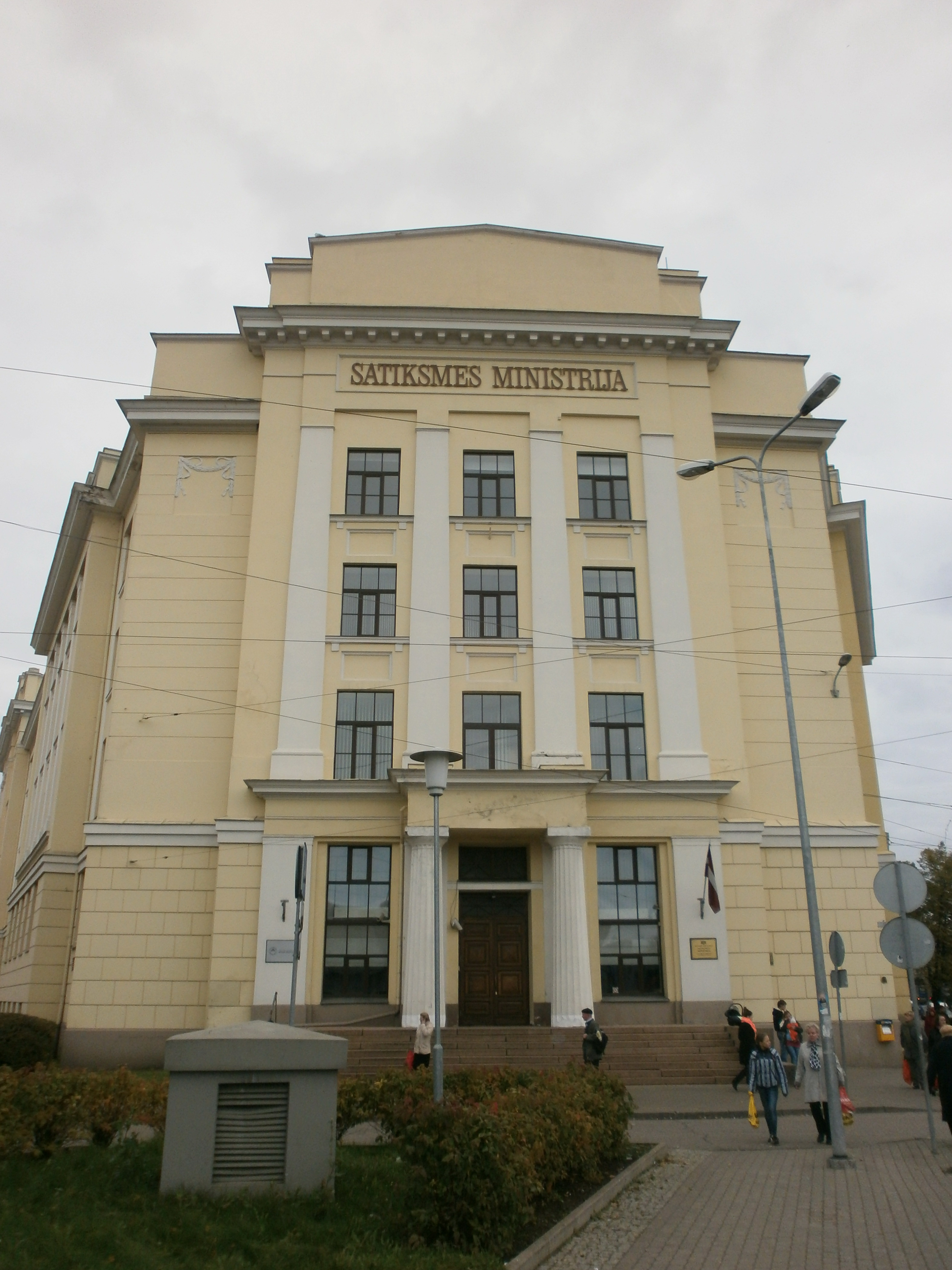
- Building of the Ministry of Transport

Agency overview
- Formed: 1918
- Headquarters: Emīlijas Benjamiņas iela 3, Riga
- Agency executives: Rihards Kozlovskis, Minister of Transport; Andulis Židkovs, State Secretary
- Website: sam.gov.lv

The Ministry of Transport (Latvian: Latvijas Republikas Satiksmes ministrija) is a ministry of Latvia which is responsible for implementing state policy in the fields of transport and communications. Its head office is in Riga. As of 29 May 2025, Rihards Kozlovskis is the minister.

== Subordinate agencies ==
- Latvian Civil Aviation Agency
- Maritime Administration of Latvia
- Transport Accident and Incident Investigation Bureau
