= Saeima and State President Security Service =

Saeima and State President Security Service emblem

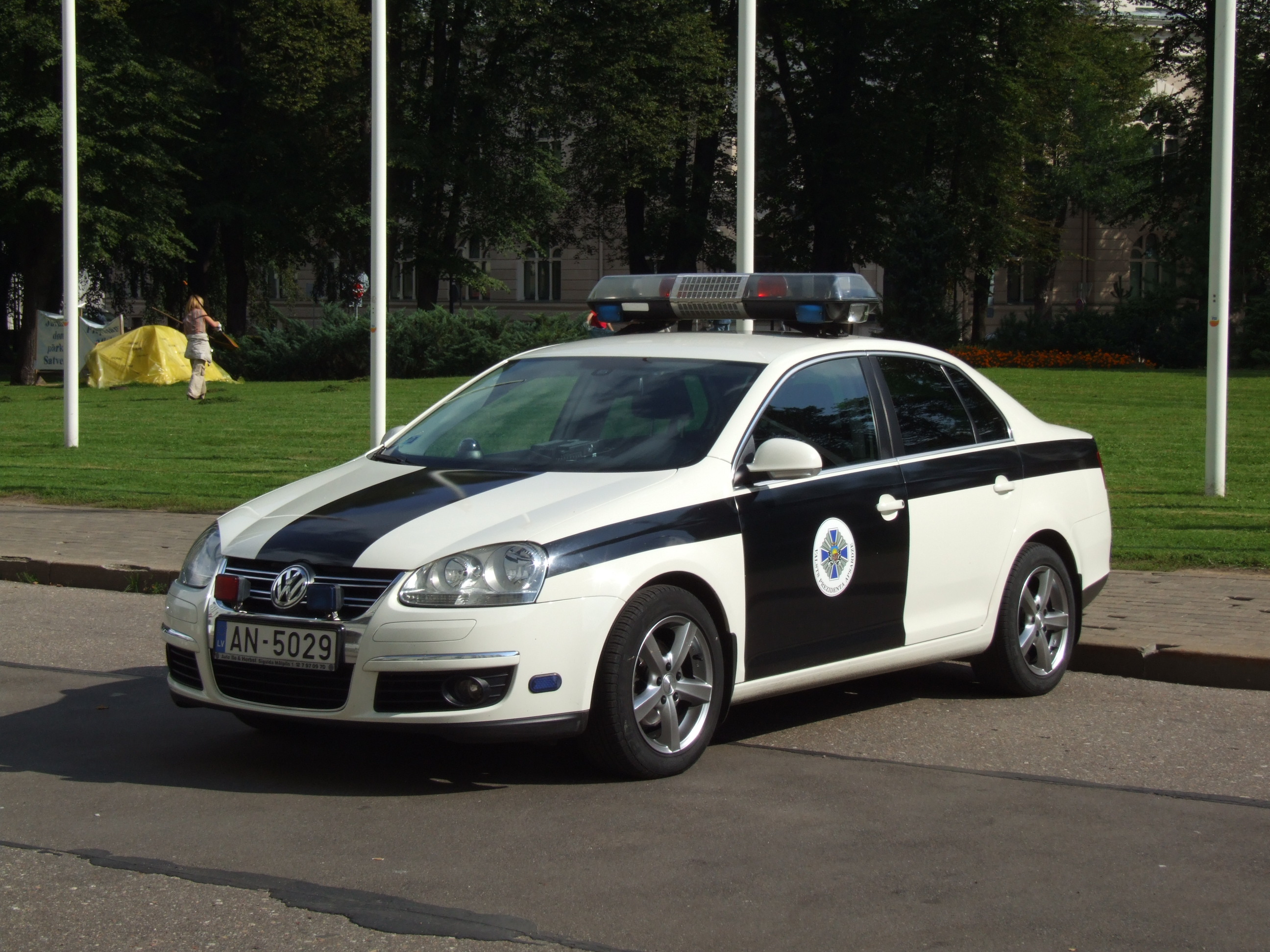
Car of the Security Service near Riga Castle

The Saeima and State President Security Service (Latvian: Saeimas un Valsts prezidenta drošības dienests, DD) was a separate unit of the National Armed Forces of Latvia. It provided security to the Parliament and State President, guarded objects, institutions and persons of national importance.

== History ==
On January 1, 2009, the Security Service was merged into the Latvian Military Police, which now carries out the duties of the Security Service.

== Mission ==
The main mission of the Security Service was to:

- Provide security for the State President, his/her family members, the State President's Chancellery and Residence;
- Provide security to Members of Parliament, the Presidium of the Parliament and its affiliated institutions (objects);
- Provide security to foreign officials and representatives of international organizations during their official visits to Latvia

== Cooperation ==
The Security Service maintained close cooperation with the State Chancellery. While providing security to high-level officials in Latvia and abroad, the Security Service also coordinated its activities with the respective foreign security service.
