= Latvian Military Police =

- Militārā policija
- Latvian Military Police emblem
- Active: 1997–present
- Country: Latvia
- Role: Military police
- Part of: Latvian Armed Forces

Commanders
- Current commander: Colonel Ēvalds Kairišs

Latvian Military Police (Latvian: Militārā Policija, MP) provide military discipline and legal order in the National Armed Forces of Latvia.

== History ==
The MP was established in 1997.

After merging with the Latvian Security Service in 2009, the Military Police is also responsible for security of the Parliament and the President of Latvia.

== Mission ==
The Military Police carries out military discipline and ensuring lawful provision functions with the right to perform investigations and operational activities, and prepares Military Police units for their deployment to international missions. It safeguards military and strategically important sites, provides escort and security of military transport columns, military cargoes, as well as of state and foreign officials. The Military Police provides for the exchange of classified materials between the state institutions of Latvia, institutions of NATO member states and other competent foreign institutions.

The main mission of the Military Police is to:

- Assist in the provision of security during military events and provide military discipline, law and order;
- Guard objects as ordered by the NAF Commander;
- Control military traffic, escort officials and guard military cargo.

== Cooperation ==
One of their priorities was to establish an MP unit for participation in NATO-led international operations. MP soldiers have participated in the peacekeeping mission in Kosovo since 1999. In addition, the first MP unit was deployed in Iraq in 2003.
