= Constitution Protection Bureau =

Latvian state security institution

- Satversmes aizsardzības birojs
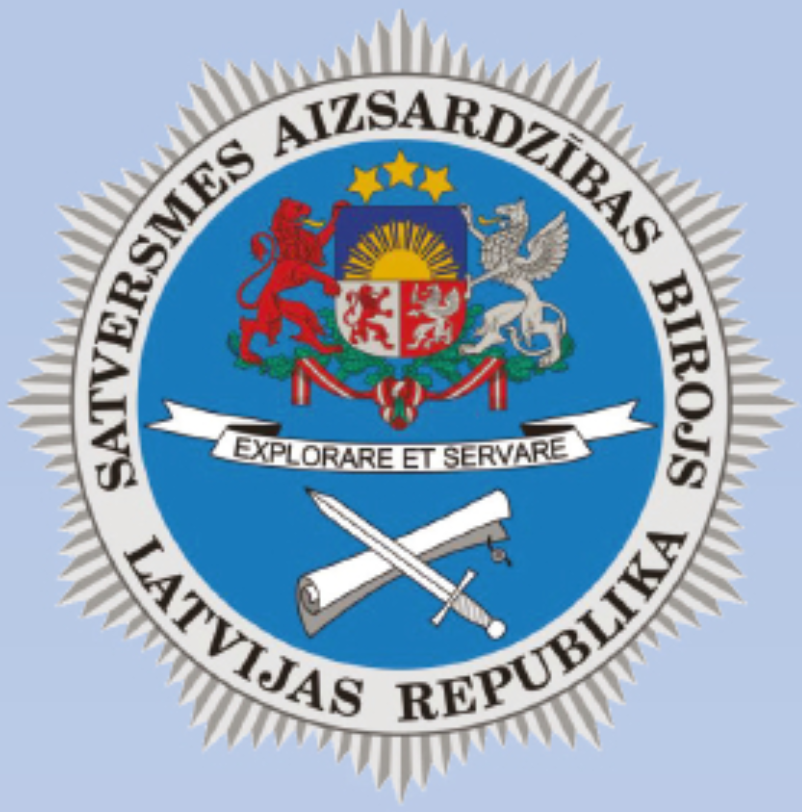

Agency overview
- Formed: 1995
- Type: Intelligence bureau
- Jurisdiction: Cabinet of Ministers of Latvia
- Headquarters: Miera iela 85A, Riga
- Agency executive: Egils Zviedris, Director
- Website: www.sab.gov.lv

The Constitution Protection Bureau (Latvian: Satversmes aizsardzības birojs, SAB) is a Latvian state security institution. It conducts intelligence and counterintelligence activities, ensures the protection of state secrets, as well as classified information of the European Union and NATO. The Bureau operates under the supervision of the Cabinet of Ministers of Latvia.

The Bureau ensures the operation of mobile phone conversation control equipment. Latvian state security and law enforcement agencies, authorized by law, conduct mobile phone conversation control using this equipment. Captured data is automatically transmitted to the respective authority, which initiates the interception of telephone conversations.

== History ==
The Constitution Protection Bureau was established in 1995 based on the Law on the Constitution Protection Bureau adopted by the Saeima. It is named after the constitution of Latvia - the Satversme.

Since November 6, 1995, the Bureau has overseen the Centre for the Documentation of the Consequences of Totalitarianism (CDCT, Latvian: Totalitārisma seku dokumentēšanas centrs, TSDC), which was established by the Presidium of the Supreme Council of the Republic of Latvia on April 16, 1992, and initially operated as a structural unit of the Ministry of Justice.

In 2003, the Latvian National Security Authority (NSA, Nacionālā drošības iestāde or NDI) was established as one of the substructures of the Bureau. Its establishment was a mandatory requirement for Latvia's accession to NATO and the European Union (EU). The last inspection by the General Secretariat Security Bureau of the EU in 2012 and the NATO Security Bureau in 2015 acknowledged that the Bureau and the NSA complied with all specified security requirements and would continue to be entitled to receive classified information.

On October 26, 2004, the Cabinet of Ministers approved Regulation No. 887 "List of State Secrets Objects," indicating military, political, economic, scientific, technical, or other information, the loss or unlawful disclosure of which may harm the national security, economic, or political interests of the state. In the field of state secret protection, the Bureau carries out checks on individuals to issue or extend special permits for access to state secret objects (special permits), as well as checks and accredits premises used for work with classified information.

== Directors ==
- 1995–2003: Lainis Kamaldiņš
- 2003–2013: Jānis Kažociņš
- 2013–2021: Jānis Maizītis
- 2022–present: Egils Zviedris

== Legislation ==
- National Security Law
- Law on State Security Institutions
- Law on the Constitution Protection Bureau
- Law on Official Secrets
- Investigatory Operations Law

== In literature ==
- Niedre, Ojārs; Daugmalis, Viktors (1999). Slepenais karš pret latviju: komunistiskās partija darbība 1920.-1940. gadā : arhīvi apsūdz (in Latvian). Totalitārisma seku dokumentēšanas centrs. ISBN 978-9984-9327-1-2.
- Okupācijas varu politika Latvijā 1939-1991: dokumentu krājums (in Latvian). Nordik. 1999. ISBN 978-9984-510-59-0.
- Latvijas izlūkdienesti 1919-1940: 664 likten̦i (in Latvian). Latvijas Universitātes žurnāla "Latvijas Vēsture" fonds. 2001. ISBN 978-9984-643-29-8.
