= State Border Guard (Latvia) =

State Border Guard Valsts robežsardze
- Emblem of the State Border Guard
- Abbreviation: RS

Agency overview
- Formed: December 13, 1991 (origins in 1919)
- Preceding agency: Border Guard Brigade

Jurisdictional structure
- Operations jurisdiction: Latvia
- Governing body: Minister of the Interior

Operational structure
- Headquarters: Rūdolfa iela 5, Riga
- Agency executive: Gen. Guntis Pujāts, Chief
- Territorial boards: 6: Riga; Viļaka; Ludza; Daugavpils; Ventspils; Aviation

Website
- www.rs.gov.lv

The State Border Guard (Latvian: Valsts Robežsardze) is the border guard of Latvia.

The State Border Guard is an institution subordinated to the Minister of the Interior. The State Border Guard is an armed institution and it serves to ensure the security of the state border and to prevent illegal migration.

Every day more than 2,000 border guards and employees of the State Border Guard fulfil their duties of service. Currently the State Border Guard comprises the Central Board, territorial boards, including the Aviation Board. The State Border Guard College is an institution of higher education under the authority of the State Border Guard.

The State Border Guard ensures surveillance of 276 km long border between the Republic of Latvia and Russian Federation, 172,9 km long border between the Republic of Latvia and the Republic of Belarus, and 498 km long sea border (external EU border), as well as monitoring of 343 km long border between the Republic of Latvia and the Republic of Estonia and 588 km long border between the Republic of Latvia and the Republic of Lithuania (internal EU border).

== History ==
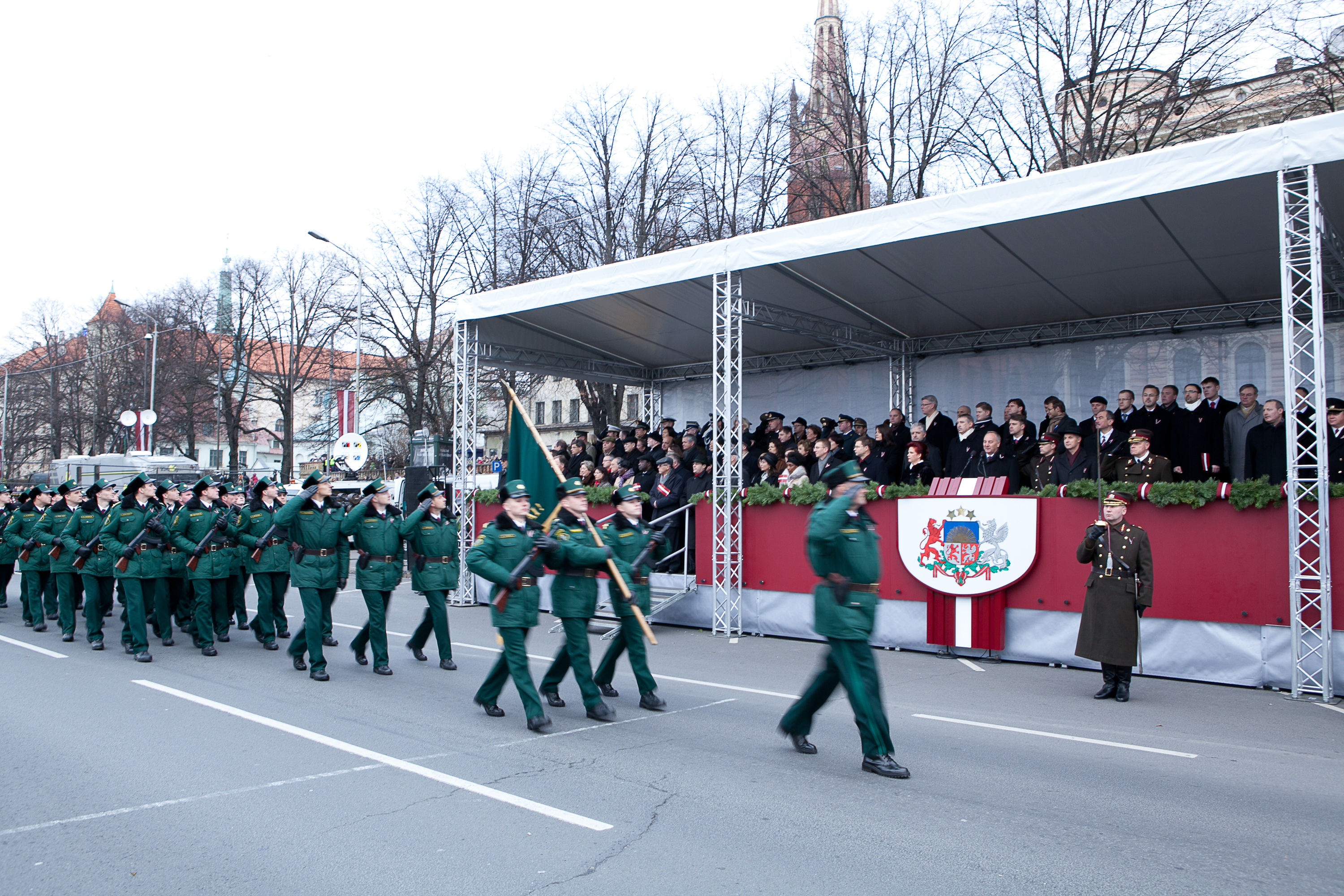
State Border Guard troops of Latvia during a parade in Riga

Flag of the Border Guard of Latvia

=== 1918–1940 ===
On November 18, 1918 the People's Council of Latvia proclaimed the independence of the Republic of Latvia as well declared temporary borders of the newly established state. For the purposes of their protection, on 7 November 1919 Jānis Balodis, Latvian Army Commander-in-Chief, issued an order to form border guard units. The activities of border guards were based on the internal border guarding provisional regulations of the People's Council, issued on 5 December 1918.

After the end of the Latvian War of Independence, on 8 November 1920 the Border Guard (Latvian: Robežapsardzība) was renamed to the Border Guard Division (Latvian: Robežsargu divīzija) and it was tasked with border protection duties.

On 2 February 1922, the Cabinet of Ministers of Latvia decided to dissolve the Border Guard Division and to assign border guarding functions to the Ministry of the Interior. On 10 March of the same year, the newly established Border Police (Latvian: Robežpolicija) took over the border guarding functions from the Border Guard Division.

In 1935 the Cabinet adopted the Law on State Border Guarding. On 6 April 1935, a separate military unit – the Border Guard Brigade (Latvian: Robežsargu brigāde) was created within the Ministry of the Interior, with General Ludvigs Bolšteins appointed as its Commander.

Shortly before the Soviet occupation of Latvia in June 1940, members of the brigade were killed, wounded and taken prisoner by Soviet NKVD Troops during the Masļenki border incident. In protest over the dissolution of the agency, General Bolšteins committed suicide at his office. On 3 October 1940 Alfons Noviks, People's Commissar of the Interior of the Latvian SSR, signed an order on the disbandment of the Border Guard Battalions and discharge of border guards from their positions. On 10 October 1940 the Border Guard Brigade of the Republic of Latvia was dissolved by the Soviet occupation authorities.

=== 1990–present ===
After the restoration of the independence of Latvia on 4 May 1990, on 20 December 1990 the Supreme Council of the Republic of Latvia adopted a Law “On State Border of the Republic of Latvia”, but due to the transitional period towards independence that lasted until August 1991 in effect, Latvian border guard units were not yet restored. On 7 November 1991 the Presidium of the Supreme Council approved the "Regulations on the Order of Taking the Oath for Soldiers of the Republic of Latvia". On 11 November 1991 the first border guards of the restored Republic of Latvia took their oath in the Brothers' Cemetery of Riga.

13 December 1991 is the date of de facto re-establishment of the Latvian Border Guard, as by the order of the Minister of Defence of 13 December 1991 No. 4-V “On the Formation, Determination of Responsibilities, Structure and Staff of the Border Guard Battalions“ the Border Guard Military Units Board of the Republic of Latvia under the MoD was established, which then assumed control over the Border Guard Battalions, the Separate Border Control Point and Border Guard Training Center Military Units. The protection of the border was entrusted to seven Border Guard Battalions located at Valmiera, Viļaka, Ludza, Daugavpils, Jelgava, Liepāja, Ventspils and Riga Separate Border Control Points.

The protection duties by the new service started by organising checkpoints on roads and taking over the functions of Soviet Border Troops in ports and airports, based on the Council of Ministers’ decision of 29 January 1992 “On Ensuring the Takeover and Guarding of the State Border of the Republic of Latvia”. By the establishment of the Border Guard Battalions, work was started on the development of border defence infrastructure – physical border marking, creation of border control infrastructure, improvement of living conditions for border guards, drafting of regulations and rules.

By the order of the Minister of Defence of the Republic of Latvia from 1 February 1992, the Border Guard Brigade of Defence Forces of the Ministry of Defence (Latvian: Aizsardzības ministrijas Aizsardzības spēku Robežsargu brigāde) was established by merging the 7 existing border battalions, the Riga Separate Border Control Point and Vārve Training Centre. By the order of Minister of Defence of 23 November 1995, the Border Guard Brigade of the National Armed Forces was reorganized into the Border Guard Forces (Latvian: Robežapsardzības spēki).

On 7 January 1997 the supervision of the Border Guard Forces was transferred to the Ministry of the Interior of Latvia. On 14 February 1997 the Border Guard Forces were renamed the Border Guard of the Ministry of the Interior, and on 1 May 1998 – the State Border Guard.

In 2024, it was reported that the Border Guard Forces acquired and deployed Long-range acoustic device along Latvia's eastern border for use in "psychological assault". These acquisitions came after a government amendment allowing the use of "psychological assault sound devices".

== Leadership ==
The border guard is led by the Chief of the Border Guard, which is appointed for a five-year term by the Ministry of the Interior after approval from the Cabinet of Ministers.

General Normunds Garbars lead the State Border Guard from 7 April 2009 to 22 January 2019, when he retired after reaching the maximum age limit. He was succeeded by General Guntis Pujāts, who previously served as Deputy Chief since 2018.

== Equipment ==
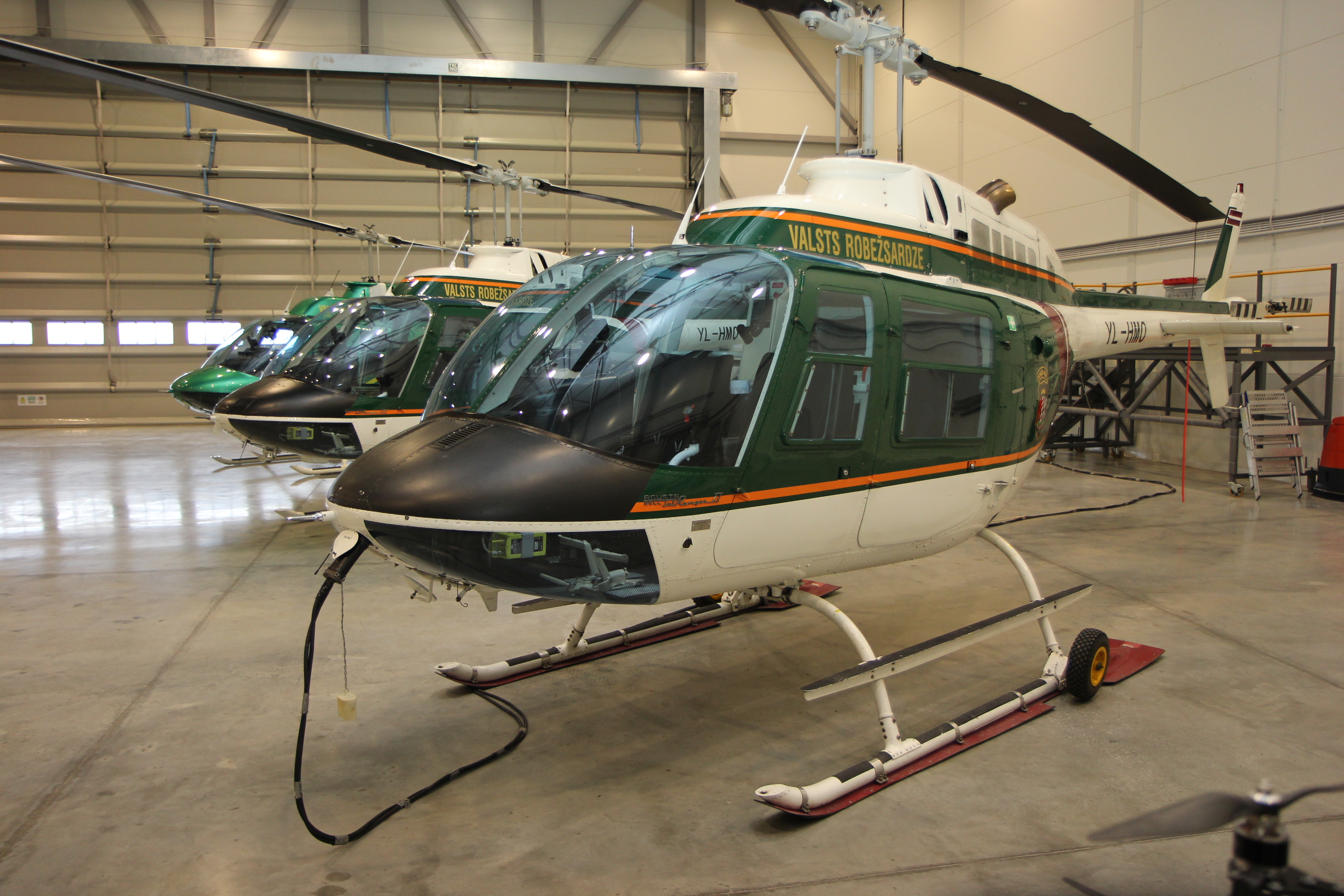
Bell 206B helicopters used by the State Border Guard.

=== Weapons ===
Model	Type	Origin	References
Glock 17	Semi-automatic pistol	Austria	
Heckler & Koch G36	Assault rifle	Germany	
KSP-58	Machine gun	Sweden	

=== Vehicles ===
- Nissan Pathfinder
- Toyota Hilux
- Renault Kangoo
- Arctic Cat ATVs
- Polaris snowmobiles

=== Patrol boats ===
3 patrol boats total:

- 1 Valpas (ex-Finnish)
- 1 Tiira (ex-Finnish)
- 1 Randa

One new patrol boat contracted in 2024.

=== Aircraft ===
- 2 x AgustaWestland A109E Power
- 2 x AgustaWestland AW119 Kx
- 2 x Bell 206B JetRanger (being replaced with other Leonardo helicopters after 2026)

== See also ==
- List of national border guard agencies
