= Latvian Civil Aviation Agency =

Civil aviation authority of Latvia

Civil Aviation Agency
- Civilās aviācijas aģentūra
- Coat of arms of Latvia

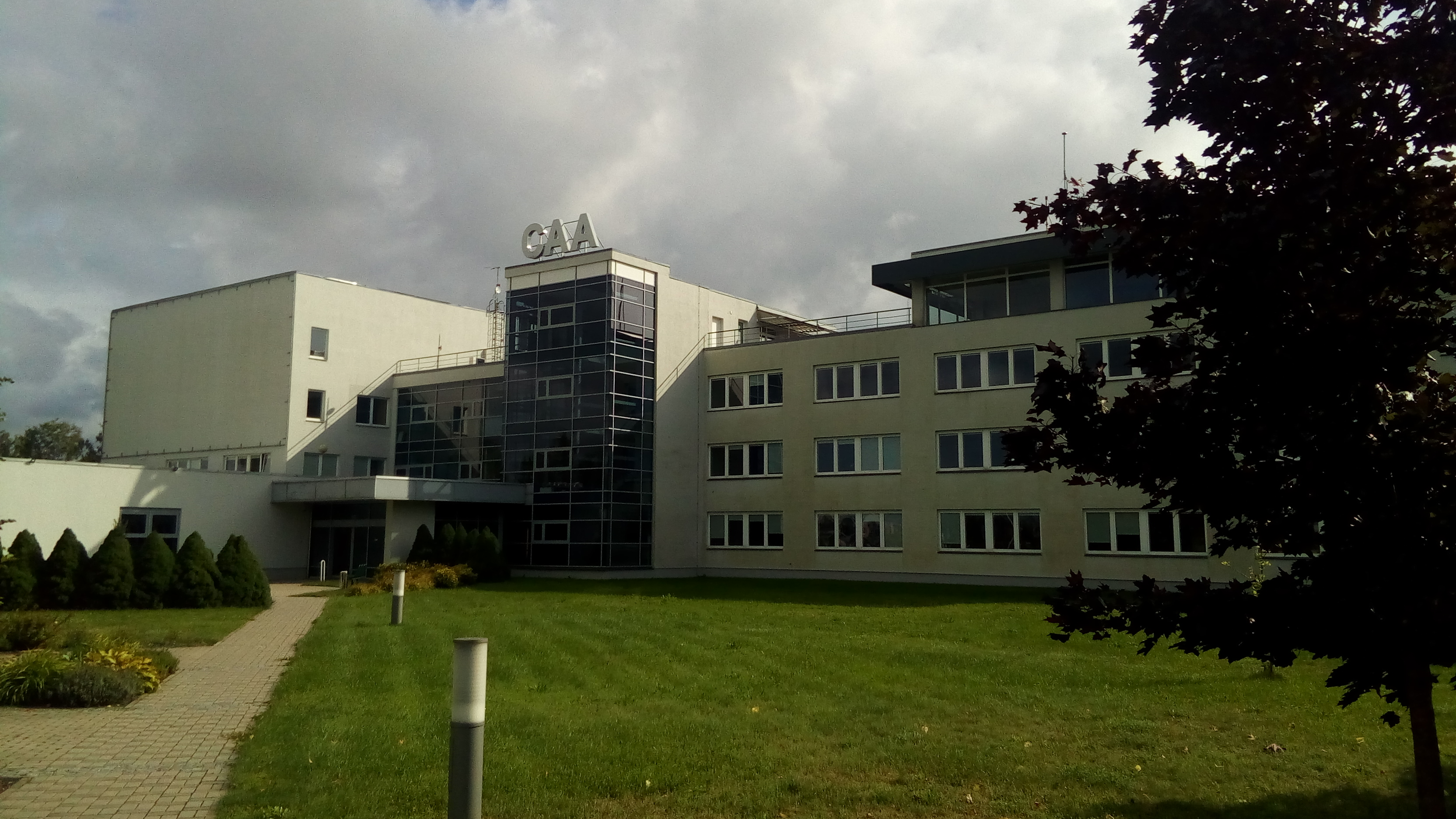
- Building of the Civil Aviation Agency

Agency overview
- Agency executive: Māris Gorodcovs, Director
- Website: www.caa.gov.lv/lv

The Latvian Civil Aviation Agency (CAA, Latvian: Civilās aviācijas aģentūra) is the civil aviation authority of Latvia. Its head office is in Riga Airport in Mārupe municipality, near the capital, Riga.

It is subordinate to the Aviation Department of the Ministry of Transport.

Under Order No. 22, the Latvia Civil Aviation Administration (Latvian: Latvijas Civilās aviācijas administrācija) was established on 1 October 1993. On 1 January 2006 the agency was reformed into the current Civil Aviation Agency.
