= 2026 elections in the European Union =

- 2026
- Parliamentary elections
Parliamentary elections in member states
Parliamentary election
No election
- Presidential elections
Presidential elections in member states
Direct presidential election
Indirect presidential election
No election

The 2026 elections in the European Union include national and regional elections in the EU member states. Nine of the twenty-seven member states (Slovenia, Denmark, Hungary, Bulgaria, Malta, Sweden, Latvia, Cyprus, and Spain) are set to elect new parliaments in 2026. Four (Portugal, Hungary, Estonia, and Bulgaria) will elect presidents.

== National elections ==
=== Parliamentary elections ===
Hungary's parliamentary election received the largest media focus of all those elecitions, as prime minister Viktor Orbán and his national conservative Fidesz party faced a strong challenge from Péter Magyar and the more moderate Tisza Party. Orbán received criticism from the European Parliament as multiple research organizations described the country as being in a state of democratic backsliding. Politico Europe described the Hungarian election as the EU's most important election of 2026.

Member state	Election	Parliament before	Head of government before	Party	EU party	Parliament after	Head of government after	Party	EU party
Slovenia	22 March		Robert Golob	Svoboda	ALDE		Janez Janša	SDS	EPP
Denmark	24 March		Mette Frederiksen	Social Democrats	PES		Mette Frederiksen	Social Democrats	PES
Hungary	12 April		Viktor Orbán	Fidesz	Patriots		Péter Magyar	Tisza	EPP
Bulgaria	19 April		Andrey Gurov (Caretaker)	Ind.	Ind.		Rumen Radev	PB	NI
Malta	30 May		Robert Abela	Labour	PES		Robert Abela	Labour	PES
Sweden	13 September		Ulf Kristersson	Moderate	EPP				
Latvia	3 October		Andris Kulbergs	AS	ECR		Andris Kulbergs	AS	ECR
Spain	29 November		Pedro Sánchez	PSOE	PES				

==== Partial parliamentary elections ====
- France, Senate: 2026 French Senate election, 27 September
- Czech Republic, Senate: 2026 Czech Senate election, 9–10 October

==== By-elections ====
- Italy, Chamber of Deputies: 2026 Italian by-elections, 22–23 March
- Ireland, Dáil Éireann: 2026 Galway West by-election, 2026 Dublin Central by-election

=== Legislative elections in presidential states ===
Cyprus is notably the only EU member state with a strong presidential system where the president serves as both head of government and head of state. As a result, the Cypriot legislature does not elect a prime minister, and instead, its members select the President of the Cypriot House of Representatives to head the body.

Member state	Election	Legislature before	Head of legislature before	Party	EU party	Parliament after	Head of legislature after	Party	EU party
Cyprus	24 May		Annita Demetriou	DISY	EPP		Annita Demetriou	DISY	EPP

=== Presidential elections in parliamentary states ===
Portugal and Bulgaria directly elect their presidents, while the presidents of Hungary and Estonia are elected indirectly by their respective parliaments, the National Assembly and the Riigikogu.

Portuguese president Marcelo Rebelo de Sousa and Bulgarian president Rumen Radev have each been elected twice and are constitutionally ineligible to serve third terms. Hungary's president, Tamás Sulyok, was forced from office by a constitutional amendment passed by the new government of Péter Magyar. Incumbent Estonian president Alar Karis was eligible for reelection, but he did not run for a second term and stated he wanted to see the office reformed.

State	Date	President before	Party	EU party	President after	Party	EU party
Portugal	18 January; 8 February	Marcelo Rebelo de Sousa	PSD	EPP	António José Seguro	PS	PES
Hungary	11 August	Tamás Sulyok	Ind.	Ind.	András Baka	Ind.	Ind.
Estonia	2 September	Alar Karis	Ind.	Ind.	Ülle Madise	Ind.	Ind.
Bulgaria	25 October; 1 November	Iliana Iotova	BSP	PES	Iliana Iotova	BSP	PES

== Referendums ==
- 2026 Italian constitutional referendum, 22–23 March

== Local elections ==
=== Austria ===
- 2026 Graz local election, 28 June

=== Czechia ===
- 2026 Czech municipal elections, 9-10 October

=== Denmark ===
- 2026 Faroese general election, 26 March

=== France ===
- 2026 French municipal elections, 15 and 22 March
- 2026 French consular elections, 22 and 31 May

=== Germany ===
- 2026 Bavarian local elections, 8 March
- 2026 Hessian local elections, 8 March
- 2026 Baden-Württemberg state election, 8 March
- 2026 Rhineland-Palatinate state election, 22 March
- 2026 Saxony-Anhalt state election, 6 September
- 2026 Mecklenburg-Vorpommern state election, 20 September
- 2026 Berlin state election, 20 September

=== Italy ===
- 2026 Italian local elections, 24-25 May & 7-8 June

=== Netherlands ===
- 2026 Dutch municipal elections, 18 March

=== Spain ===
- 2026 Aragonese regional election 8 February
- 2026 Castilian-Leonese regional election, 15 March
- 2026 Andalusian regional election, 17 May

=== Sweden ===
- 2026 Swedish local elections, 13 September
