= 2023 Latvian presidential election =

- 31 May 2023
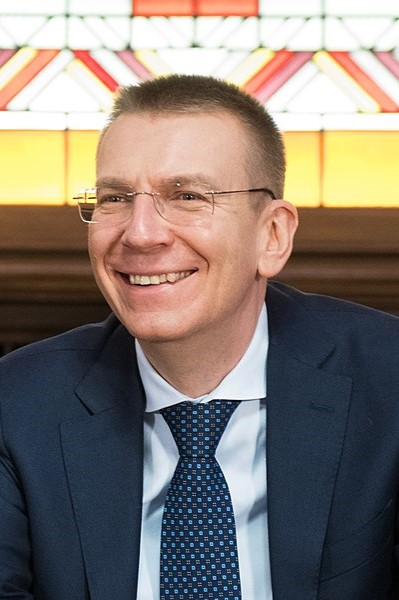

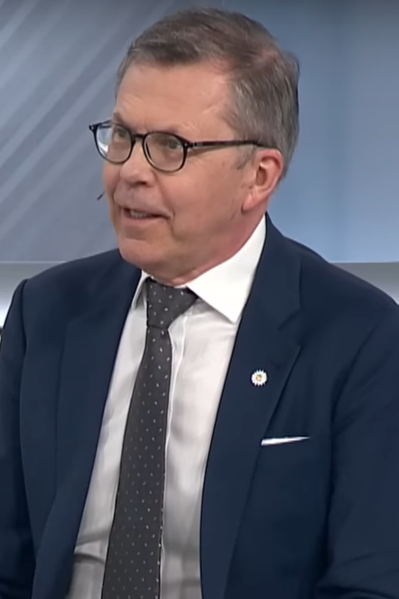
Candidate	Edgars Rinkēvičs	Uldis Pīlēns
Party	Unity	Independent
Electoral vote	52	25
President of Latvia before election
Egils Levits
Independent
Elected President of Latvia
Edgars Rinkēvičs
Unity

Indirect presidential elections were held in Latvia on 31 May 2023 to elect the President of Latvia, who is the country's head of state.

Rinkēvičs was elected President of Latvia on 31 May 2023 after three rounds of voting by the Saeima – the Parliament of Latvia. He was sworn in as president on 8 July.

== Background ==
In late 2022, political scientist and historian Gatis Krūmiņš stated that the 2023 presidential election could cause friction in the Second Kariņš cabinet and potentially lead to its downfall due to disagreements on who should be the presidential candidate. Ultimately failing to reach agreement on a candidate, the three government parties – New Unity, the United List, and the National Alliance – presented two presidential candidates, both in April 2023. The United List named their candidate; the founder of the party alliance, entrepreneur Uldis Pīlēns, while New Unity and the National Alliance endorsed the reelection of the incumbent president, Egils Levits.

== Voting system ==
Before the first round of the presidential election, the political parties represented in the Saeima nominate their candidate.

The President of the Republic is elected in the first round if he receives the absolute majority of the deputies, i.e. 51 votes out of 100.

In case of failure, another round is organized with the same candidates or different ones, and under the same conditions. If no one is elected, others rounds are held minus the least voted candidate in the previous one, until a candidate receives 51 votes and becomes President of Latvia. The Speaker of the Saeima chairs the electoral college.

== Candidates ==
In the fall of 2022, entrepreneur Uldis Pīlēns was the Prime Minister candidate of the United List, a party alliance that he founded. He, however, did not run in the 2022 Latvian parliamentary election. Pīlēns confirmed his presidential run on 11 April 2023. Alongside the announcement of his candidacy, he was endorsed by the United List, who will also be officially nominating him in the elections in the Saeima. Subsequently, his candidacy was also endorsed by Latvia First, whose stated main priority is to prevent the reelection of the incumbent president, Egils Levits.

The incumbent President of Latvia since 2019, Egils Levits, announced his candidacy on 19 April 2023 at a joint press conference with Prime Minister Krišjānis Kariņš of the New Unity party alliance, who voiced his support for Levits' reelection. The National Alliance had previously stated that they would both support and officially nominate Levits for the election in the Saeima.

Official nominations for the presidency in the Saeima began on 10 May, where Pīlēns was the first to submit his candidacy. On the same day, however, Levits unexpectedly withdrew his candidacy, citing a "currently developing de facto coalition among pro-Kremlin-oriented and oligarch-linked political forces". He also encouraged the only other candidate at the time, Uldis Pīlēns, to also step aside in order for the government coalition to find and put forward one common candidate. On 11 May, The Progressives announced its presidential candidate as diaspora activist Elīna Pinto, and on the same day Edgars Rinkēvičs, the then Minister of Foreign Affairs of Latvia, announced his candidacy, with New Unity unanimously supporting it.

Candidate	Party	Endorsing party	Candidacy announced	References
Uldis Pīlēns; Entrepreneur, founder of United List	Independent (Note: Pīlēns is the founder and informal leader of United List, but is officially an independent)	United List (also supported by Latvia First)	11 April 2023	
Elīna Pinto; Civic and diaspora activist	Independent	The Progressives	11 May 2023	
Edgars Rinkēvičs; Minister of Foreign Affairs of Latvia (2011–2023)	New Unity	New Unity	11 May 2023	

=== Withdrawn candidates ===
Candidate	Party	Endorsing party	Candidacy announced	Candidacy rescinded	References
Egils Levits; Jurist, President of Latvia (2019–2023)	Independent	National Alliance (also supported by New Unity)	17 April 2023	10 May 2023	

== Results ==
Voting to elect the president took place in three rounds. In the first round, no candidate was able to receive the necessary number of votes. Rinkēvičs received 42 votes, with New Unity and Union of Greens and Farmers voting for him, and 45 voted against him. Pīlēns received 25 votes from United List, Latvia First and MP Glorija Grevcova, but had 62 MP vote against him. Pinto, who was supported by The Progressives, received ten votes from them, but 77 votes against her.

Since no candidate received the minimum 51 votes, a second round was held. This round's results were exactly the same as the previous round's.

If no candidate is elected in the second round, the candidate with the lowest number of votes (in this case Pinto) withdraws, leaving only Pīlēns and Rinkēvičs in the third round of voting. In the third round, the ten members of the Progressives who in the second round voted for Pinto now voted for Rinkēvičs, giving him 52 votes and making him the President of Latvia, whilst the votes for Pīlēns did not change from the second round to the third.

Candidate	Party	First round		Second round		Third round	
Candidate	Party	Votes	%	Votes	%	Votes	%
Edgars Rinkēvičs	Unity	42	54.55	42	54.55	52	67.53
Uldis Pīlēns	Independent	25	32.47	25	32.47	25	32.47
Elīna Pinto	Independent	10	12.99	10	12.99		
Total		77	100.00	77	100.00	77	100.00
Valid votes		77	88.51	77	88.51	77	88.51
Invalid/blank votes		10	11.49	10	11.49	10	11.49
Total votes		87	100.00	87	100.00	87	100.00
Registered voters/turnout		100	87.00	100	87.00	100	87.00

== Aftermath ==
Rinkēvičs inauguration as president took place on the 8th of July.

=== Reactions ===
==== In Latvia ====
Immediately after being elected, Rinkēvičs gave a speech in which he thanked the Saeima for having trust in him and stated he would do everything in his power so Latvia "blossoms" and has a unified society. He said he was ready to cooperate with the Saeima and government, and in a later press conference stated he would not change Latvia's foreign policy. Incumbent president Egils Levits congratulated Rinkēvičs, stating he was "sure that Latvia will be in safe hands for the next four years" and wishing him good luck. Rinkēvičs was also congratulated by Latvia's European commissioner and former Prime Minister Valdis Dombrovskis, who described him as a statesman who has honorably served Latvia's interests internationally.

==== Abroad ====
After Rinkēvičs was declared President, President of Ukraine Volodymyr Zelenskyy congratulated him, stating that he looked forward to continuing close cooperation with Latvia. Rinkēvičs was also congratulated by President of Estonia Alar Karis, who stated he was "happy to continue close cooperation" between the two countries and "[hoped] to see [him] soon" when he visits Estonia. Lithuanian President Gitanas Nausėda called Rinkēvičs to congratulate him and said he was "looked forward to working together in the Baltic family", whilst US Secretary of State Antony Blinken stated that "Latvia is a valued NATO partner" and that he hoped to "continue close partnership" with it. President of The European Parliament Roberta Metsola similarly congratulated him, while adding that "Europe continued to count on his commitment and Latvia's strong support for Ukraine".
