= 2026 Hessian local elections =

Local elections in Hesse, Germany

- 8 March 2026

1,979 district council seats
- Turnout: 2,563,598 (54.3%) ▲3.9%
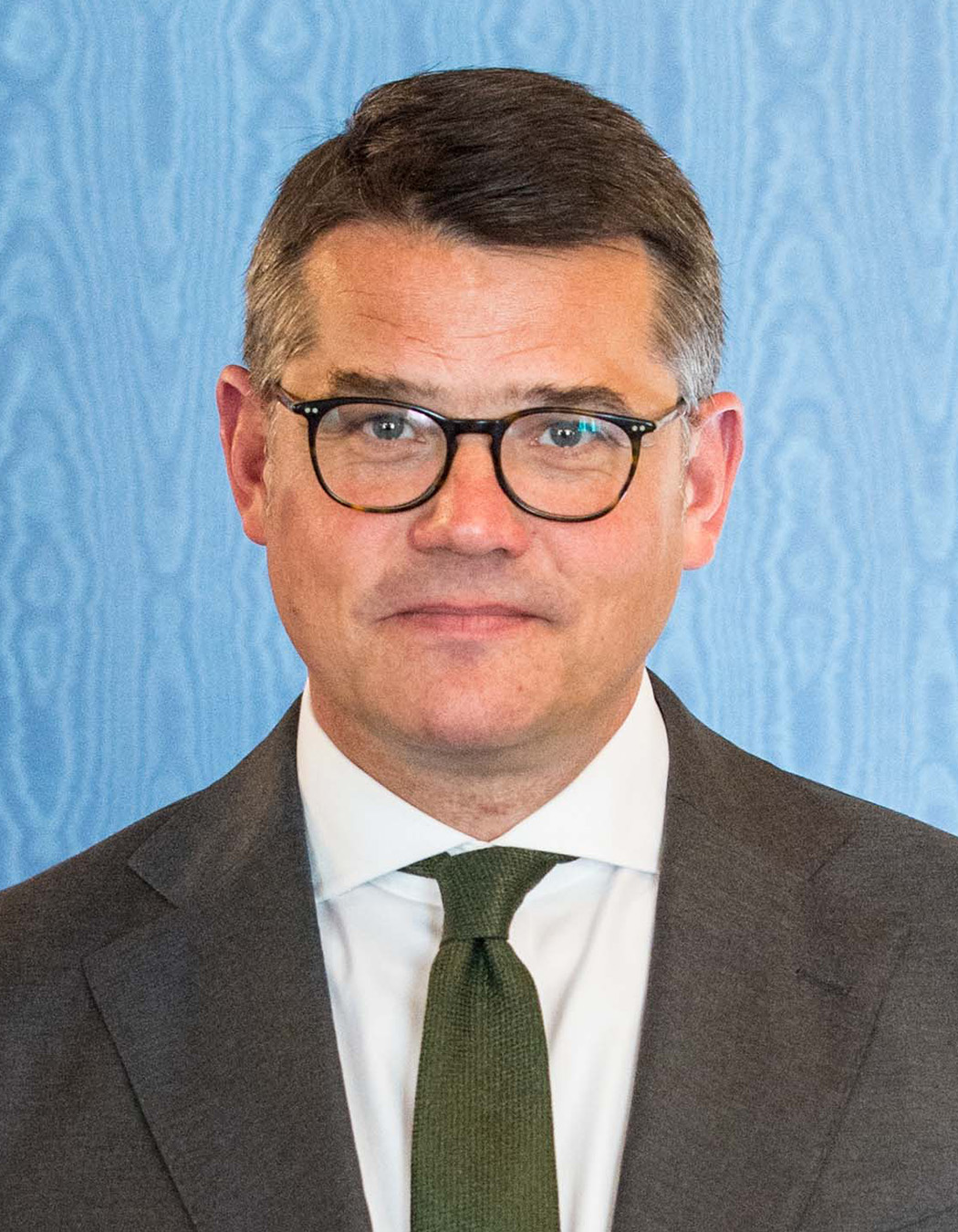

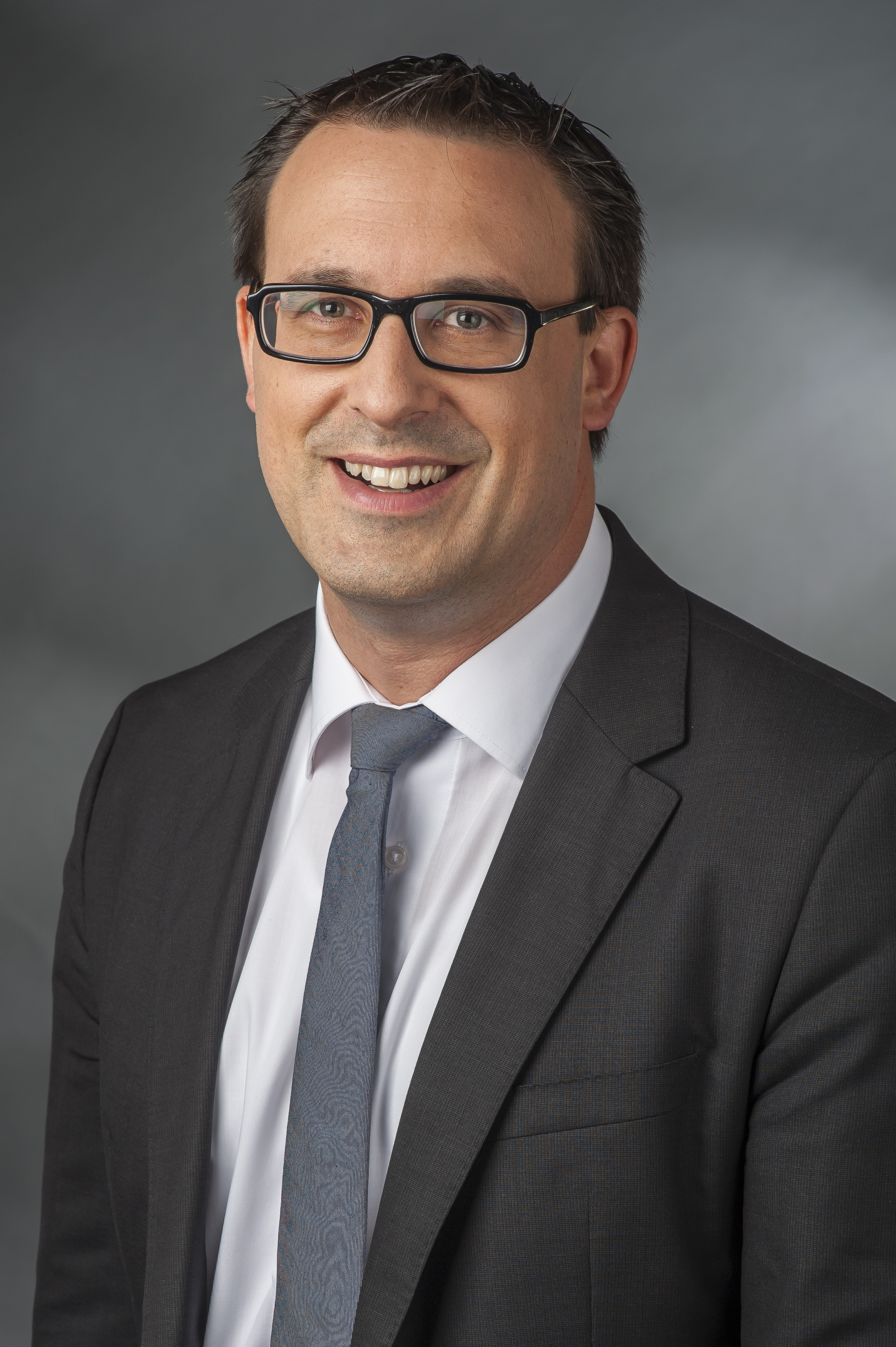

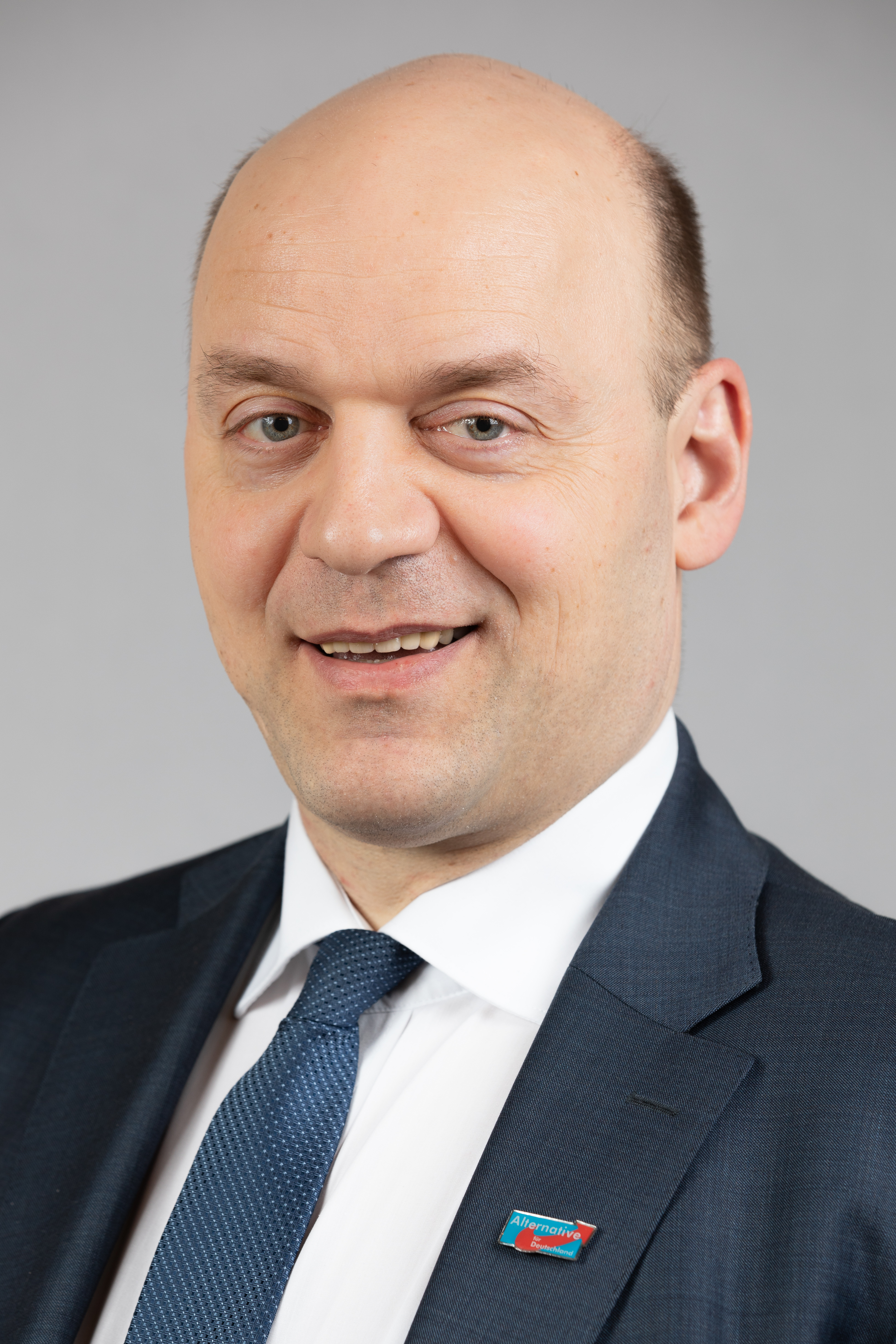

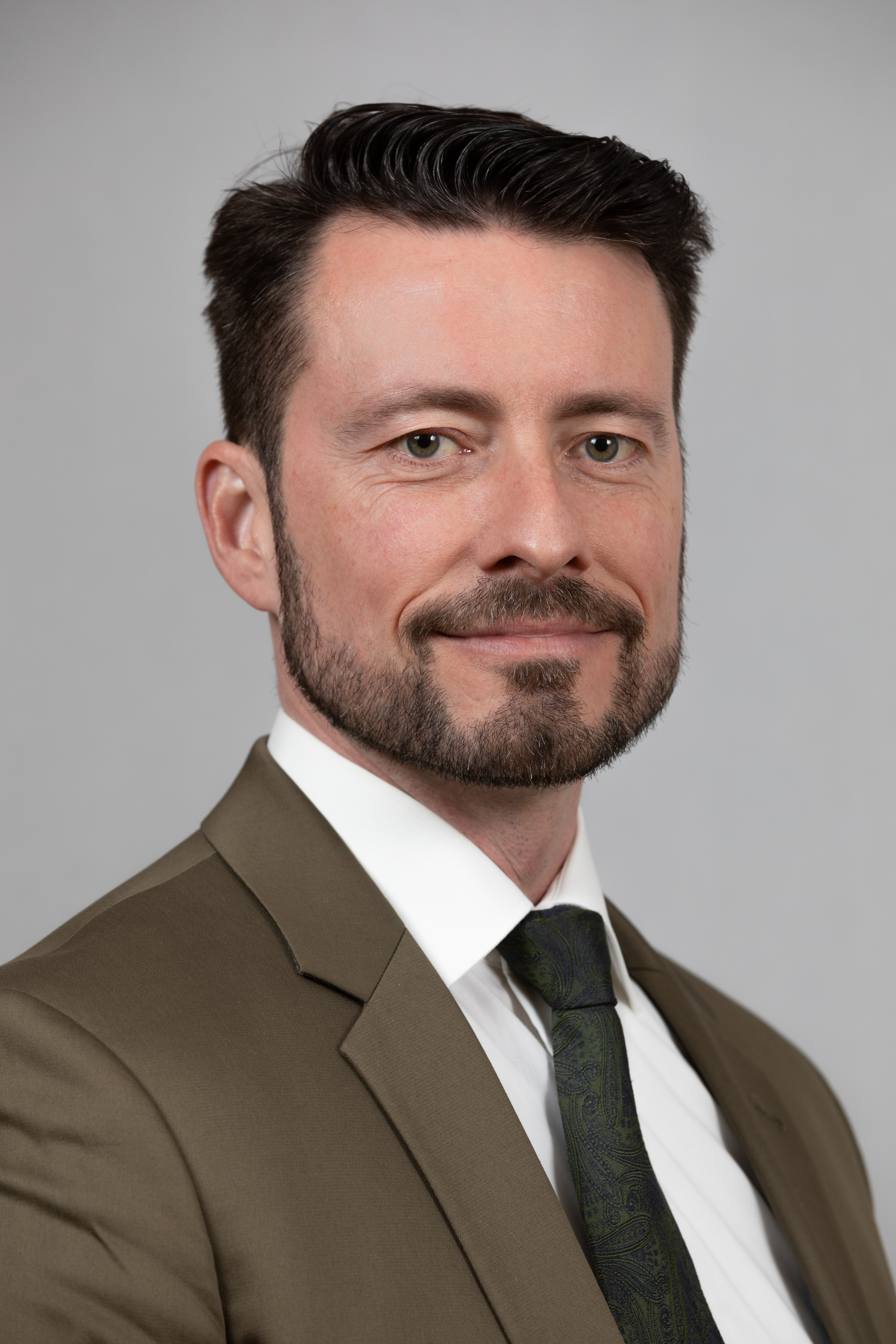
	First party	Second party	Third party
Leader	Boris Rhein	Sören Bartol	Robert Lambrou & Andreas Lichert
Party	CDU	SPD	AfD
Last election	544 seats, 28.5%	476 seats, 24.0%	132 seats, 6.9 %
Seats won	579	428	294
Seat change	▲35	▼48	▲162
Popular vote	736,413	512,824	364,480
Percentage	29.8%	20.8%	14.8%
Swing	▲1.3%	▼3.2%	▲7.9%
	Fourth party	Fifth party	Sixth party
Leader	Julia Frank & Anna Lührmann (pictured)	Jakob Migenda & Desiree Becker	None
Party	Greens	Linke	Local voters' associations
Last election	343 seats, 18.4%	77 seats, 4.0%	85 seats, 5.9%
Seats won	265	112	82
Seat change	▼78	▲35	▼3
Popular vote	344,951	139,922	101,611
Percentage	14.0%	5.7%	4.1%
Swing	▼4.4%	▲1.7%	▼1.9%

The 2026 Hessian local elections were held on March 15, 2026 to elect members of Hesse's 21 district councils and 6 independent city councils.

== Background ==
All Germans and European Union citizens who have reached the age of 18 and have resided in their municipality for at least six weeks were eligible to vote. Homeless people were also able to vote for the first time with the establishment of a registration process for people with no fixed address. In March 2025, The Greens proposed a bill in the Landtag of Hesse to lower the voting age in the state's municipal elections from 18 to 16, as is the case in the majority of German states. The bill was defeated in September 2025, with the CDU, AfD, and SPD voting against, and The Greens and FDP voting in favour.

Prior to the elections, the CDU and SPD grand coalition in the Landtag of Hesse passed legislation to change the seat allocation method for municipal elections from the Hare/Niemayer method to the D'Hondt method; in order to reduce the fragmentation of district councils among many smaller parties. This change was successfully challenged in court by the Free Democratic Party, Die PARTEI, and the Hessian Klimaliste; meaning that the Hare/Niemayer method remained in use for this election.

== Results ==
The Christian Democratic Union (CDU) placed first, as it did in the previous elections in 2021. It also became the strongest party in Frankfurt, overtaking The Greens. Similarly, the Social Democratic Party (SPD) again placed second, although it lost approximately 10% of its seats. The Greens experienced the most significant losses of any parties, losing 78 seats; although it remained the strongest party in the cities of Darmstadt and Kassel. The Alternative for Germany (AfD) had the strongest gains of any party, although it did not become the strongest party in any municipality.

Over a dozen small parties also contested the elections with varying results. Volt more than doubled its share of the vote and seats. The Sahra Wagenknecht Alliance (BSW) participated for the first time since its formation in 2024, winning 14 seats. Other parties winning seats for the first time include Team Todenhöfer, the Human Environment Animal Protection Party, and the Grassroots Democratic Party. Meanwhile, several smaller parties lost all their seats, including The Homeland, Alliance C – Christians for Germany, and the Pirate Party.

Summary of results for the 2026 Hessian local elections
Party	Votes	%	+/-	Seats	+/-
Christian Democratic Union (CDU)	736,413	29.8	▲1.3	579	▲35
Social Democratic Party (SPD)	512,824	20.8	▼3.2	428	▼48
Alternative for Germany (AfD)	364,480	14.8	▲7.9	294	▲162
The Greens (Grüne)	344,951	14.0	▼4.4	265	▼78
Die Linke	139,922	5.7	▲1.7	112	▲35
Local voters' associations	101,611	4.1	▼1.8	82	▼3
Free Democratic Party (FDP)	97,512	3.9	▼2.8	77	▼46
Free Voters (FW)	70,586	2.9	▼0.4	62	▲4
Volt	48,549	2.0	▲1.2	37	▲23
Sahra Wagenknecht Alliance (BSW)	19,756	0.8	New	14	New
Die PARTEI	12,984	0.5	▼0.4	11	▼8
Human Environment Animal Protection Party (Tierschutzpartei)	10,232	0.4	New	9	New
Alliance for Innovation and Justice (BIG)	2,258	0.1	Steady	2	▼1
Team Todenhöfer	2,045	0.1	New	4	New
Ecological Left	1,770	0.0	Steady	1	▼1
PRO AUTO	1,267	0.0	Steady	1	Steady
MERA25	1,021	0.0	New	0	New
The Homeland	755	0.0	▼0.1	0	▼2
Alliance C – Christians for Germany	605	0.0	Steady	0	▼1
Grassroots Democratic Party (dieBasis)	412	0.0	Steady	1	▲1
Pirate Party	147	0.0	▼0.2	0	▼4
Party of Humanists	95	0.0	New	0	New
Total	2,470,262	96.4	▲0.4	1,979	▲59
Invalid votes	93,336	3.6	▼0.4		
Voter turnout	2,563,598	54.3	▲3.9		
Eligible voters	4,717,136				
