= Edvards Smiltēns =

Latvian politician (born 1984)

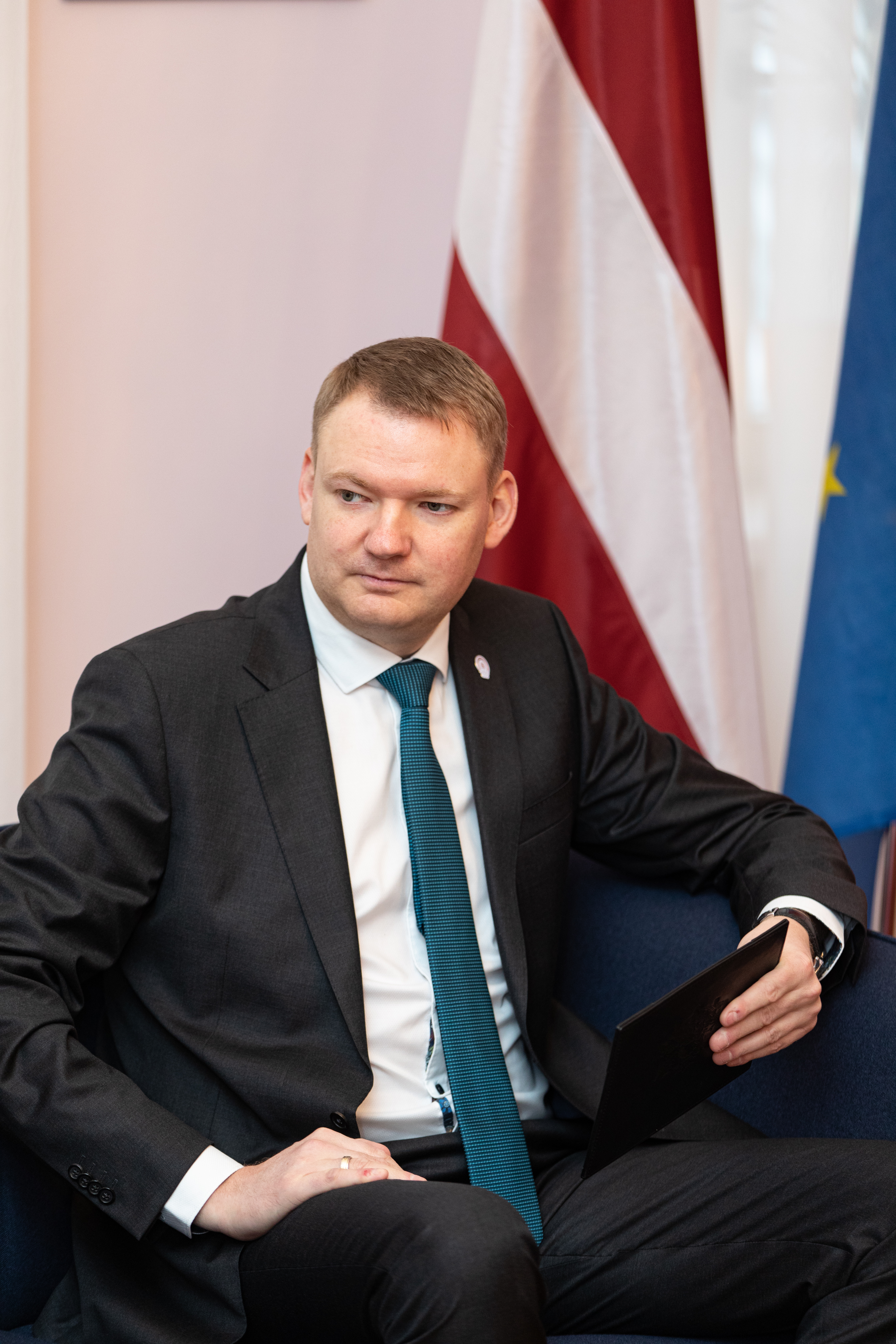
- Smiltēns in 2022

12th & 14th Speaker of the Saeima
- Incumbent
- Assumed office 3 November 2026
- President: Edgars Rinkēvičs
- Prime Minister: Andris Kulbergs
- Preceded by: Daiga Mieriņa
- In office 1 November 2022 – 20 September 2023
- President: Egils Levits; Edgars Rinkēvičs
- Prime Minister: Krišjānis Kariņš; Evika Siliņa
- Preceded by: Ināra Mūrniece
- Succeeded by: Daiga Mieriņa

Minister of Justice
- In office 29 May 2026 – 3 November 2026
- President: Edgars Rinkēvičs
- Prime Minister: Andris Kulbergs
- Preceded by: Inese Lībiņa-Egnere
- Succeeded by: Viesturs Vitovskis

Personal details
- Born: 18 September 1984 (age 42)
- Party: Society for Political Change (2009–2011); Unity (2011–2017); Latvian Association of Regions (since 2017)
- Children: 1 son

Edvards Smiltēns (born 18 September 1984) is a Latvian politician serving as Speaker of the Saeima since 3 November 2026. He is a member of the 15th Saeima. He previously served as the Minister of Justice in 2026, and was also Speaker of the Saeima from 2022 to 2023.

== Early life and education ==
Smiltēns was born in 1984 in Riga, Latvia. He received his early education from Riga French Lyceum. Later, he attended the University of Latvia, where he earned a bachelor's degree in social sciences in law.

== Career ==
In November 2010, Smiltēns was elected as a member of the Saeima.

In 2014, he stood as a candidate for the Saeima elections, but was not elected. In December, he was confirmed as Parliamentary Secretary at the Ministry of Education and Science, a position he held until March 2016.

In the summer of 2017, when the party "Unity" was going through a crisis, Smiltēns was nominated as one of the contenders for the position of the party leader, but on 19 August, he announced that he was leaving the party and its Saeima faction.

In November 2022, Smiltēns was elected as the Speaker of the Saeima. Due to his connection with the new government in Latvia and United List, on 20 September 2023, Edvards Smiltēns lost the chair of the Speaker of the Saeima, and was succeeded by Daiga Mieriņa. He subsequently became Secretary of the Saeima, until 28 May 2026, when he became Minister of Justice.
