= Baiba Broka =

Baiba Broka may refer to:

- Baiba Broka (actress) (born 1973), Latvian actress
- Baiba Broka (politician) (born 1975), Latvian lawyer and politician
