= Jānis Bordāns =

Latvian politician and lawyer

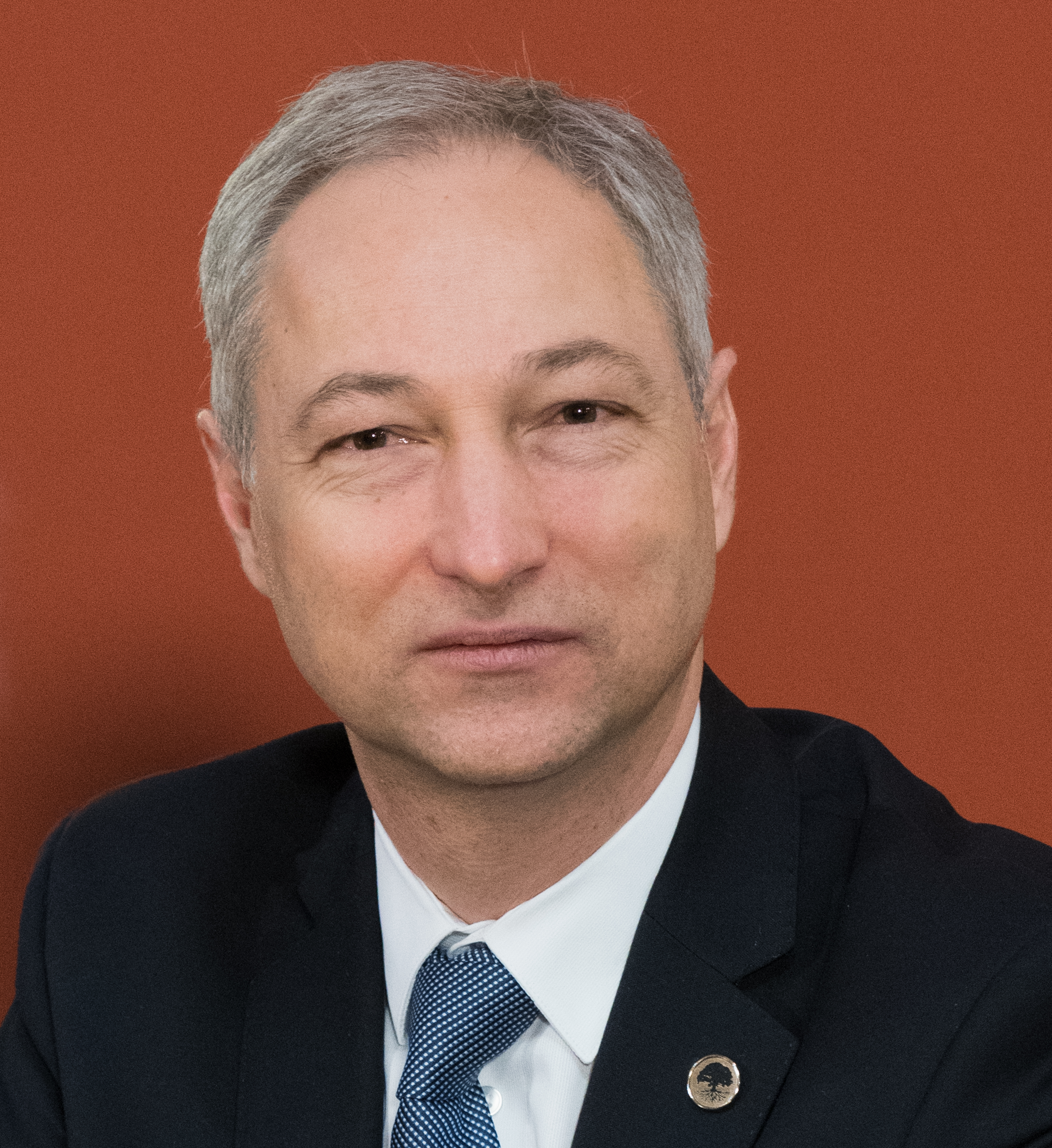

Minister of Justice
- In office 23 January 2019 – 14 December 2022
- Prime Minister: Arturs Krišjānis Kariņš
- Preceded by: Dzintars Rasnačs
- Succeeded by: Inese Lībiņa-Egnere
- In office 5 July 2012 – 22 January 2014
- Prime Minister: Valdis Dombrovskis
- Preceded by: Gaidis Bērziņš
- Succeeded by: Baiba Broka

Personal details
- Born: 21 June 1967 (age 59) Balvi, Latvian SSR, Soviet Union
- Party: National Alliance (2012 – 1 November 2013); The Conservatives (2014 – 2024)
- Spouse: Ingeborga Bordāne
- Children: 3
- Education: University of Latvia
- Profession: Lawyer

Jānis Bordāns (born 21 June 1967) is a Latvian politician and lawyer, the Deputy Prime Minister and the former Minister of Justice of the Republic of Latvia from 2019 to 2022, and previously from 2012 to 2014.

Bordāns served as Minister of Justice in Valdis Dombrovskis' cabinet from July 2012 to January 2014, representing the National Alliance party. He later left the National Alliance and founded The Conservatives in May 2014, which he has led since then.

Led by Bordāns, the New Conservative Party won 16 seats in the 2018 Latvian parliamentary election, sharing the second place with another party in a fragmented parliament.

On 7 November 2018, Latvian President Raimonds Vējonis asked Bordāns to form a new coalition government and serve as the next Prime Minister of Latvia. Bordāns intended to form a five-party majority coalition, and he announced that his coalition will not include ZZS, a political alliance led by a Latvian oligarch Aivars Lembergs. However, other political parties wished to cooperate also with ZZS. Consequently, Bordāns did not reach an agreement with the coalition partners, and informed the President that he is unable to form the cabinet. In the following weeks, five parties agreed to form a coalition without ZZS, however, a compromise prime minister candidate from the smallest political party represented in parliament was selected.

Thus, in January 2019, Bordāns took office for a second term as Minister of Justice and the Deputy Prime Minister in the centre-right coalition cabinet of Arturs Krišjānis Kariņš.

In 2022, his party lost elections, which meant he could not serve an other term. He was replaced by Inese Lībiņa-Egnere.

== Education ==
Bordāns graduated Riga Secondary School 39 in 1985. In 1992, he graduated from the University of Latvia and got a Master of Laws degree.
