= Romāns Apsītis =

Latvian jurist and politician (1939–2022)

Ombudsman of Latvia
- In office 1 March 2007 – 28 February 2011
- Preceded by: Diāna Šmite
- Succeeded by: Juris Jansons

Minister of Justice
- In office 19 September 1994 – 21 December 1995
- Preceded by: Egils Levits
- Succeeded by: Dzintars Rasnačs

Member of the Saeima
- In office 6 July 1993 – 1 November 1998

Member of the Supreme Council of Latvia
- In office 1990–1993

Personal details
- Born: 13 February 1939 Riga, Latvia
- Died: February 2022 (aged 83)
- Party: CPSU; Latvian Way
- Education: University of Latvia

Romāns Apsītis (13 February 1939 – February 2022) was a Latvian jurist and politician.

A member of the Latvian Way, he served in the Saeima from 1993 to 1998 and was Minister of Justice from 1994 to 1995. He died in February 2022, at the age of 83.
