= Inese Lībiņa-Egnere =

Latvian politician (born 1977)

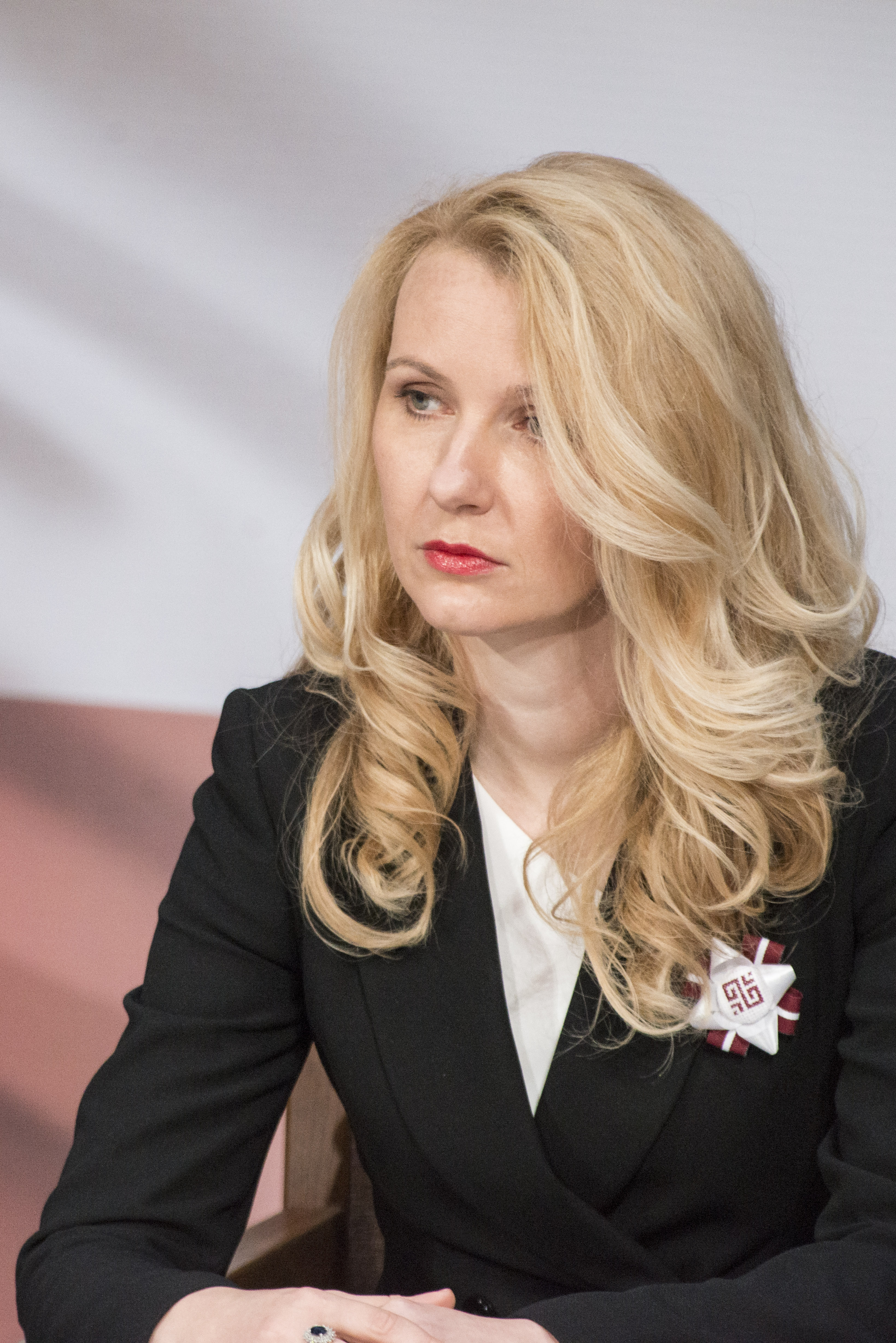
- Lībiņa-Egnere in 2015

Minister of Justice
- In office 14 December 2022 – 28 May 2026
- Prime Minister: Krišjānis Kariņš; Evika Siliņa
- Preceded by: Jānis Bordāns
- Succeeded by: Edvards Smiltēns

Member of the Saeima
- In office 17 October 2011 – 14 December 2022

Personal details
- Born: 25 September 1977 (age 49) Riga, Latvian SSR
- Party: Unity
- Other political affiliations: Reform Party
- Spouse: Jan Hendrik Egner
- Education: University of Latvia; University of Freiburg
- Profession: Lawyer
- Committees: Legal Affairs Committee Parliamentary Inquiry Committee

Inese Lībiņa-Egnere (born 25 September 1977) is a Latvian politician representing the Unity party who served as the Minister of Justice from 2022 until 2026. She was a member and Deputy Speaker of the 11th Saeima (elected from Reform Party). She was the Deputy Speaker and the Chairperson of the National Security Committee of the 12th Saeima. In 2022, Lībiņa-Egnere was elected in the 14th Saeima.

== Early life and career ==
Lībiņa-Egnere was born on 25 September 1977 in Riga. She completed her secondary education in Liepaja Secondary School No5 in 1996. Higher education was gained in the Faculty of Law at the University of Latvia and afterwards at the University of Freiburg in Germany.

She became a member of a law firm "Liepa, Skopiņa/BORENIUS". Since 2004, she has been a lecturer – Assistant Professor at the Department of Civil Law, University of Latvia. In 2007, she completed her doctoral studies and gained a Doctor in Law at the University of Latvia. From 2007 to 2011 she was the legal advisor to the President of the Republic of Latvia Valdis Zatlers.

== Political activities ==
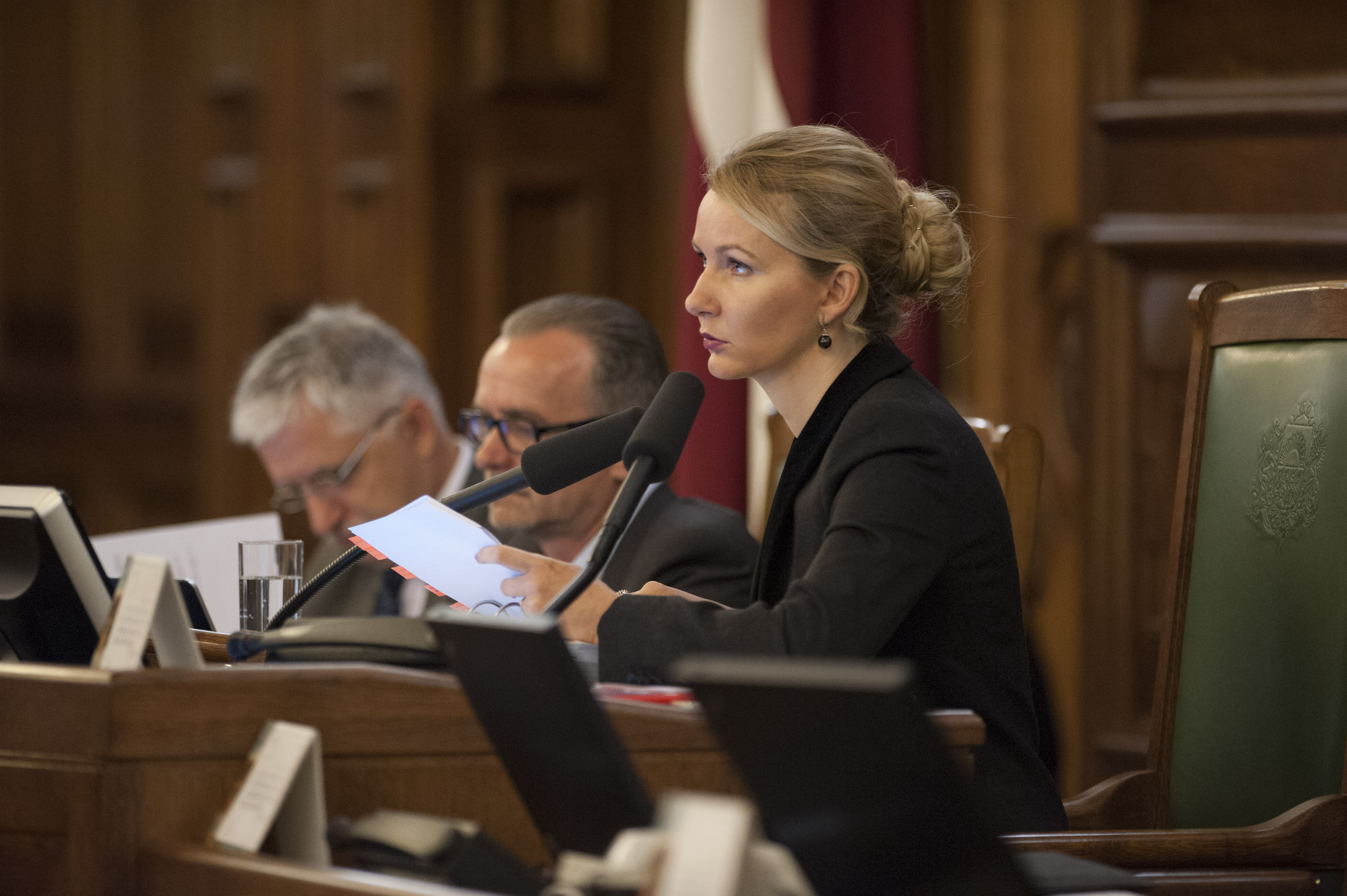
Inese Lībiņa-Egnere at the Plenary sitting of the Saeima

In 2011 Lībiņa-Egnere joined Zatlers` Reform Party. As a party list candidate for the 11th Parliamentary elections, she was elected from the Courland region. She became a member of the Legal Affairs Committee and the European Affairs Committee. Since 20 October 2011 has been the Deputy Chairperson of the Legal Affairs Committee. On 14 June 2012 she was elected the Deputy Speaker of the Saeima.

In May 2014, together with a group of deputies and ministers from the Reform Party, Lībiņa-Egnere joined the political party Unity, from which she was elected in the 12th Saeima. Currently is the Deputy Speaker of the Saeima, Chairperson of the National Security Committee, the Deputy Chairperson of the Legal Affairs Committee, and the Chairperson of Judicial Policy Subcommittee of the Legal Affairs Committee.

In addition to her role in parliament, Lībiņa-Egnere has been serving as the head of the Latvian delegation to the Parliamentary Assembly of the Council of Europe. As member of the Assembly, she currently is the chairwoman of the Sub-Committee on Human Rights. She also serves as a member of the Committee on Legal Affairs and Human Rights; the Committee on the Honouring of Obligations and Commitments by Member States of the Council of Europe (Monitoring Committee); the Committee on the Election of Judges to the European Court of Human Rights; the Sub-Committee on the implementation of judgments of the European Court of Human Rights. In this capacity, she has been the Assembly's co-rapporteur on the situation in Moldova since 2021.

She participated in the 2022 Latvian parliamentary election as part of the New Unity alliance and was elected, and has served as the Minister of Justice in the Second Kariņš cabinet since 14 December 2022.
