= Andris Kulbergs =

Prime Minister of Latvia since 2026

- Kulbergs in 2026

25th Prime Minister of Latvia
- Incumbent
- Assumed office 28 May 2026
- President: Edgars Rinkēvičs
- Preceded by: Evika Siliņa

Member of the Saeima
- In office 1 November 2022 – 28 May 2026
- Constituency: Riga

Personal details
- Born: 26 May 1979 (age 47) Riga, Latvian SSR, Soviet Union
- Party: Independent
- Other political affiliations: United List
- Spouse: Anna Kulberga
- Children: 3
- Education: Tallinn University of Technology (BA); Riga Technical University (MBA)

Andris Kulbergs ([ˈandris ˈkulbærɡs]; born 26 May 1979) is a Latvian businessman and politician serving as the prime minister of Latvia since 2026. Before being elected to the Saeima as a non-party member of the United List ticket in 2022, he worked in a number of roles in the private sector. He also serves as the president of the Latvian Authorised Automobile Dealers Association. Following the resignation of Prime Minister Evika Siliņa on 14 May 2026, he was tasked by Latvian President Edgars Rinkēvičs to form a governing coalition for the five months before the 2026 Latvian parliamentary election. He was able to successfully form a coalition of the United List, New Unity, National Alliance, and Union of Greens and Farmers parties, and was confirmed as prime minister on 28 May 2026 with 66 votes in parliament. As prime minister he has called for budgetary reform as well as stricter oversight of AirBaltic and the Rail Baltica infrastructure project, while continuing the pro-Ukraine foreign policy of his predecessors.

== Early life and business career ==
Kulbergs was born on 26 May 1979 in Riga. He studied at Riga Secondary School No. 50 and Rīgas Komercskola ('Riga School of Commerce') and earned a bachelor's degree in international business from Concordia International University Estonia (later merged with Tallinn University of Technology) in 2002. He also obtained his MBA from the Riga Business School of the Riga Technical University in 2015.

Kulbergs has served in a number of private sector roles such as the marketing programme director for the telecommunications company Lattelecom, the managing director for Auto Torino, the regional director for Auto Group Baltic, managing director for Baltic Motors Ltd., head of the Inchcape group of companies in Latvia, and chairman of the Board of VK Development. Since 2006, he has served in various capacities in the leadership of the Latvian Authorised Automobile Dealers Association, and is currently its president.

== Parliamentary career ==
Kulbergs participating in an extraordinary sitting of Saeima in 2023 in which Estonian President Alar Karis gave an address.

In 2022, Kulbergs was elected as a member of the 14th Saeima as a member of the United List alliance, as a non-party member of the NGO "United List of Latvia" (Apvienotais Latvijas saraksts, since 2026 – "Restart of Latvia", Latvijas Restarts) led by the alliance's leader Uldis Pīlēns. In the Saeima, he was the chairman of the Innovation Ecosystem Development Subcommittee and served on the Committee on National Economy, Agrarian, Environmental and Regional Policy and the Committee on Public Expenditure and Audit. He ran for the European Parliament on the United List ticket in 2024, but was not elected.

During his time in parliament, Kulbergs has criticized the implementation of the Rail Baltica infrastructure project, such as the postponed "Riga Loop" portion of the track (which spans from the main track through the Riga Central Station and Riga Airport), predicting that the project might become the "problem of the century". As a member of opposition, he expressed criticism of the Latvian government's emergency loan for flag carrier AirBaltic during the 2026 Strait of Hormuz crisis, favoring a complete restructuring of the company.

During the 2025 debate over whether to withdraw from the Istanbul Convention on women's rights, which had been ratified by Saeima just two years prior, Kulbergs initially expressed support for withdrawal but then abstained from voting due to health issues. In response to Latvian national awakening leader Dainis Īvans's comments attacking parliamentarians who voted in favor of withdrawal, Kulbergs disparaged him on social media. He is the only member from United List who has expressed public support for same-sex marriage in Latvia.

== Prime Minister ==
Two days after the resignation of former Prime Minister Evika Siliņa on 14 May 2026, Kulbergs was nominated as candidate for Prime Minister of Latvia by President Edgars Rinkēvičs for the remaining five months until the 2026 Latvian parliamentary election. On 20 May, representatives from Kulbergs's United List as well as the New Unity, National Alliance, and Union of Greens and Farmers parties/alliances announced a four-party coalition had been agreed to in principle. The new government kept in place a number of ministers from the previous Siliņa cabinet. The new government was confirmed on 28 May 2026 with 66 votes in parliament.

=== Domestic Policy ===
==== Finance ====
While a candidate for prime minister, Kulbergs expressed the need to review the current state budget, noting that due to disruptions such as the Strait of Hormuz crisis expenses must be cut in the short term. On 10 June 2026, Kulbergs announced that changes must be made to a new state financing model for municipal governments that had been developed by the previous government but the implementation of which had been paused due to objections of municipal leaders.

==== Transportation ====
As prime minister, Kulbergs has continued his criticism of the business practices of the majority state-owned flag carrier Air Baltic, saying that "not a single cent" of government money would be invested in the airline until a more robust long-term business plan had been developed. On 14 September 2026, Air Baltic announced that it had filed for Chapter 11 bankruptcy protection in the United States, with Kulbergs offering to declassify all previous government decisions regarding the airline. Later that month, Kulbergs claimed that the airline had "gambled" by filing for bankruptcy, pointing out that a strategic partner still needed to be found.

He also remained devoted to implementing reforms in the Rail Baltica project, criticizing Estonian officials of being overly optimistic about timelines and suggesting cost-reduction solutions such as reducing the speed of the trains. Kulbergs offered to take a leadership role, claiming that out of the other Baltic leaders he was the most technically knowledgeable person about the project. During a meeting on 1 October 2026, Kulbergs's government approved a 20 million per kilometer ceiling for the Rail Baltic project in Latvia.

=== Foreign policy ===
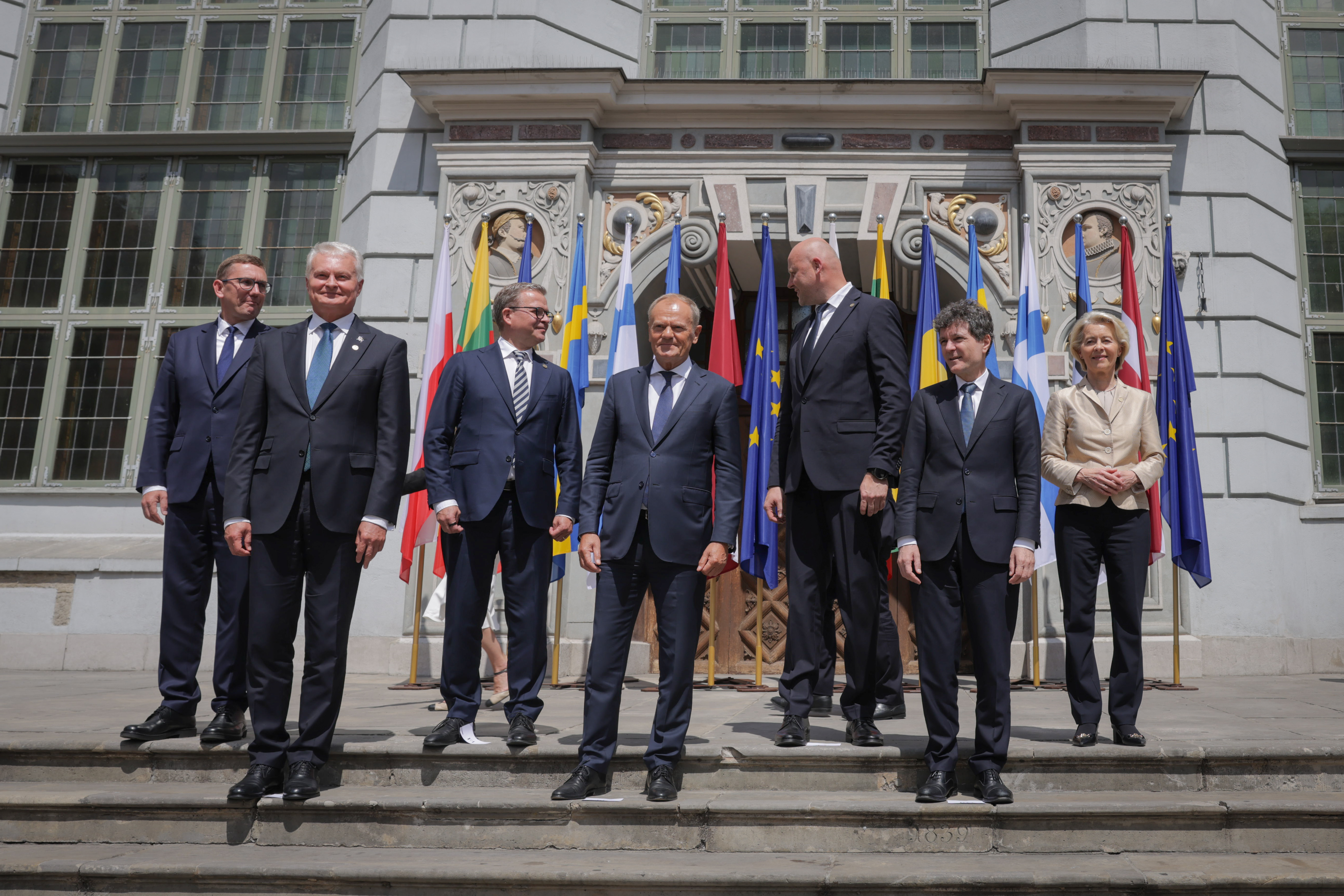
Kulbergs participating in the Ukraine Recovery Conference (URC 2026) in Poland

On 26 May, Kulbergs announced that Baiba Braže would be one of five ministers from the previous coalition who would continue working in the new government, signaling that there would not be a departure from the western-oriented foreign policy taken by previous governments. As have previous prime ministers, Kulbergs made his first foreign visit as prime minister to Estonia on 9 June 2026.

==== Russia ====
In the Kulbergs government declaration announced on 18 May 2026, the implementation of "measures to weaken and isolate Russia" was outlined as a priority. On 2 June 2026, Kulbergs instructed foreign minister Baibe Braže to find a solution in coordination with the European Union to halt imports and exports with Russia, however adding that exceptions might be made in certain sectors such as pharmaceuticals. In June 2026, Kulbergs announced plans for a joint Latvian-Ukrainian drone-producing facility in eastern Latvia. Russian State Duma Defense Committee member Andrei Kolesnik threatened that Russia might fire upon on such a facility due to it producing weapons seen as intending to target the Russian Armed Forces.

==== Ukraine ====
Like his predecessors, Kulbergs has expressed strong support for Ukraine in the ongoing Russo-Ukrainian war, signing a comprehensive defense cooperation agreement between Latvia and Ukraine with president Volodymyr Zelenskyy on 9 June 2026. On 29 June 2026, Kulbergs announced the opening of a joint drone factory with Ukraine in the region of Latgale near the borders of Russia and Belarus. Kulbergs has expressed support for Ukrainian ascension into NATO, calling the Ukrainian military one of the world's strongest.

==== United States ====
In July, 2026, Kulbergs welcomed a bipartisan group of members from the House of Representatives, thanking them for US military presence in Latvia and commitment to protecting the country. In September 2026, Latvia along with the other Baltic states were not invited to an upcoming meeting between the United States and other NATO allies over the future of the alliance, raising alarm over commitment to protecting the Latvia against potential aggression from Russia. Kulbergs urged calm, claiming that the United States' defense relationship with the Baltic States was already being discussed in "other formats."

=== 2026 parliamentary election ===
Graphical summary of opinion polling between the 14th and 15th Saeima elections. United List experienced a significant boost upon Kulbergs becoming prime minister, rising from 5th to 1st place in the polls.

On the 15 May 2026, it was announced at a United List party meeting that Kulbergs would be the party's nominee for the post of prime minister in both the ongoing coalition formation process as well as in the 2026 Latvian parliamentary election. Since assuming the post of prime minister later that month, United List experienced a significant boost in polling, consistently coming in first place in all major polls that were conducted during his term. During the campaign, Kulbergs featured heavily in United List marketing, using the phrase "Kulbergs is the solution" in social media posts. United List came in first place with 35.288% of the vote and won 41 seats, the highest percentage of votes since the Saeima election of 1920 and the highest amount of seats by a single ticket in the history of Saeima.

== Personal life ==
Kulbergs is married to Anna Kulberga, with whom he has three children. An automotive fan, Kulbergs publicly disclosed in 2022 upon election to Saeima that he owns 11 automobiles. In 2022 after suffering an automobile accident that temporarily required him to use a wheelchair, he advocated for infrastructure improvements to the streets and sidewalks of Riga to be better accessible for those with special needs. When his second child was born in 2023, it was reported by Latvian media sources how he drove his wife and baby home in a rally car, which has been a family tradition for two generations.
