= Desiree Becker =

German politician (born 1994)

Member of the Bundestag
- Incumbent
- Assumed office 2025
- Constituency: Hesse

Personal details
- Born: 27 January 1994 (age 32) St. Wendel, Germany
- Party: The Left
- Website: desiree-becker.eu

Desiree Becker (born 27 January 1994) is a German politician and member of the Bundestag. A member of The Left, she has represented Hesse since 2025.

Becker was born on 27 January 1994 in St. Wendel. She has stated that she joined the CDU in her early years due to a lack of alternatives in St. Wendel. She has been co-leader of The Left in Hesse since October 2024. She was The Left's candidate in Gießen (constituency 172) at the 2025 federal election but was not elected. She was however elected to the Bundestag on The Left's state list in Hesse.

In 2025 Becker made a speech in the Bundestag on behalf of The Left group opposing a resolution that would extend the Bundeswehr's involvement in Kosovo as peacekeepers. She argued that the involvement did not achieve its stated goal of increasing stability between Kosovo and Serbia and that the peacekeeping mission in Kosovo would continue to miss its goals as long as the EU remained silent about Serbian president Vučić's war crime denial and support for Serbian ethnonationalism.
