= Riga Business School =

Coordinates: 56.9533866°N 24.082283°E

- Rīgas Biznesa Skola
- Motto: We share success
- Type: Public
- Established: 1991
- Director: Inese Muzikante
- Location: Riga, Latvia
- Website: http://www.rbs.lv/
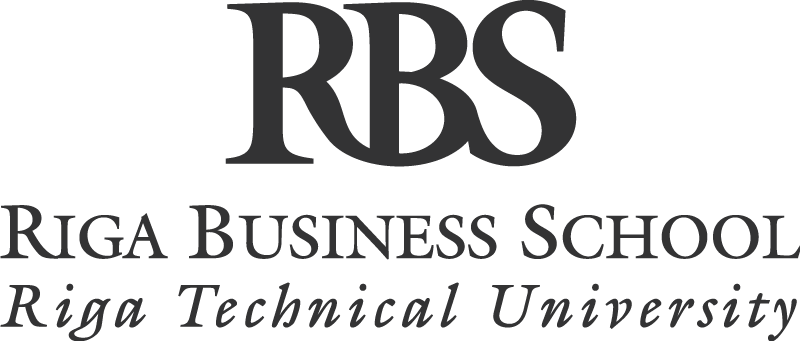

Riga Business School (Latvian: RTU Rīgas Biznesa Skola; abbreviated as RBS) is a higher education institution within the Riga Technical University, located in Riga, Latvia. Established in 1991 through the cooperation of Riga Technical University, the State University of New York at Buffalo (SUNY Buffalo) in the United States, and the University of Ottawa in Canada, RBS was the first institution in the Baltics to offer English only MBA programs.

Since 2012, Riga Business School has been offering a Bachelor of Management in International Business in collaboration with the BI Norwegian Business School. RBS operates with two admission periods annually: fall and spring semesters. The school employs both local and international faculty, including professors from North America and other countries.

Since summer 2025, Riga Business School is located at Ķīpsalas iela 6, on the RTU student campus in Riga.

== History ==
Riga Business School was founded in 1991 by Riga Technical University and SUNY Buffalo. In 1992 RBS began a student exchange program with the University of Ottawa. In 1993, Riga Technical University, SUNY Buffalo, and the University of Ottawa formed a three-sided partnership and founded the RBS Language Center, the school's library, a computer class, and MBA courses with instructors from North America.

Riga Business School holds several accreditations and recognitions, such as an International Quality Assurance (IQA) accreditation from the Central and East European Management Development Association, making it the first state institution of higher education in Latvia to receive this award.

RBS maintains cooperative relationships with the State University of New York at Buffalo and the University of Ottawa.
