= 2026 French consular elections =

Election for advisers to French people living abroad

- 22 to 27 May 2026 (Internet voting); 30 and 31 May 2026 (in-person voting)

433 consular councillors 77 consular delegates
- Registered: 1,784,975

French people living outside France were called upon to elect, for the third time, 433 advisers to French people living abroad (also called consular councillors) and 77 consular delegates in May 2026.

== Consular delegates and advisors ==
The 433 advisers to French people living abroad are the elected officials who represent French citizens residing abroad in consulates and embassies, in consular councils. Seventy-seven consular delegates are elected at the same time as the advisers to rectify the population disparities between constituencies.

These two groups of officials serve, alongside the 11 deputies representing French citizens residing abroad, form the electoral college to elect the 12 senators representing French citizens residing abroad. The advisers also elect the 90 members to the Assembly of French Citizens Abroad

== Electoral system ==
The 442 advisers to French people abroad are elected through universal suffrage in each consular constituency, each electing between 1 and 9 advisers depending on the population of the constituency.

The voting system used is either a first-past-the-post vote for single-member constituencies, or party-list proportional representation for constituencies electing multiple advisors.

== See also ==
- Elections in France
