= Andreas Lichert =

German politician (born 1975)

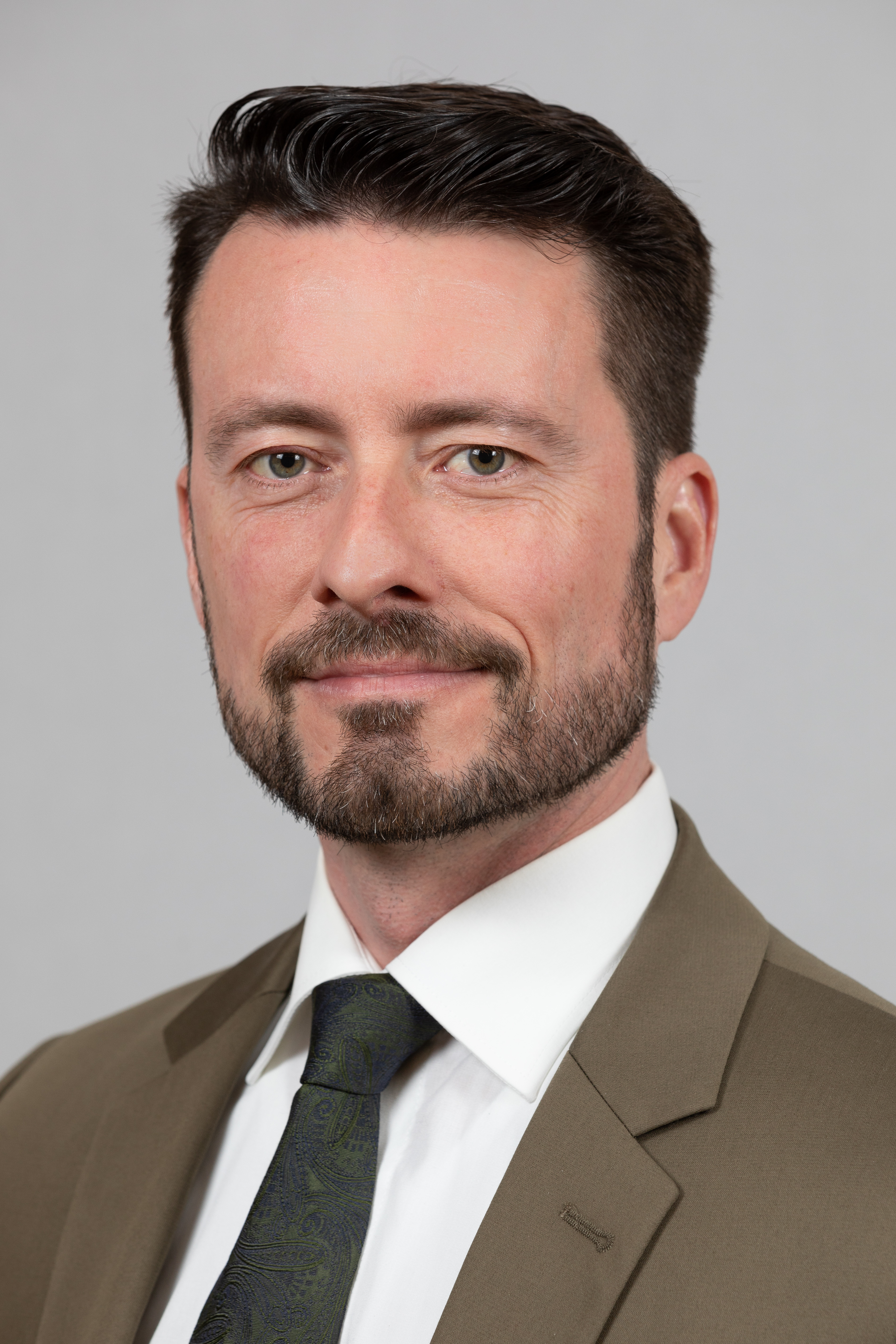
- Lichert in 2019

Member of the Landtag of Hesse
- Incumbent
- Assumed office 18 January 2019

Personal details
- Born: 19 September 1975 (age 50) Bad Homburg vor der Höhe
- Party: Alternative for Germany (since 2013)

Andreas John Lichert (born 19 September 1975 in Bad Homburg vor der Höhe) is a German politician serving as a member of the Landtag of Hesse since 2019. He has served as co-chairman of Alternative for Germany in Hesse since 2021.
