= Baiba Broka (politician) =

Latvian lawyer and politician

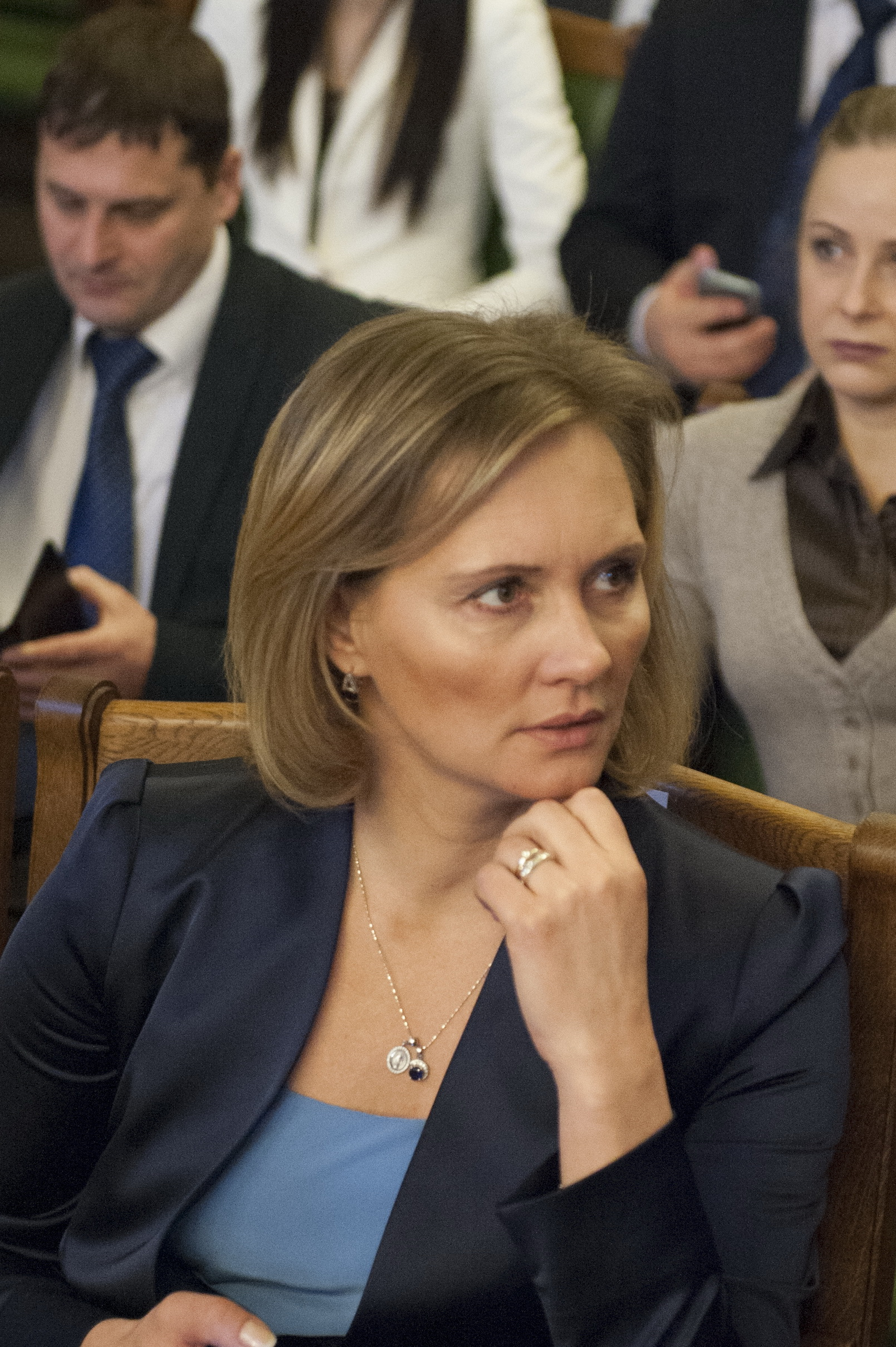

Minister of Justice of Latvia
- In office 22 January 2014 – 6 August 2014
- President: Andris Bērziņš
- Preceded by: Jānis Bordāns
- Succeeded by: Gaidis Bērziņš

Personal details
- Born: 2 October 1975 (age 50) Madona, Latvian SSR (now Latvia)
- Party: TB/LNNK (2006–2011); National Alliance (2011–2019)
- Education: University of Latvia

Baiba Broka (born 2 October 1975 in Madona, Latvia) is a Latvian lawyer, academic, former politician, former Minister of Justice of Latvia from the National Alliance.

Broka has an academic career since 1998 in The University of Latvia Faculty of Law teaching Law of Obligations, Consumer Law and Legal Writing. She has been a visiting lecturer in Tulane University (USA, Summer School), Concordia University of Estonia, The Northwestern School of Law of Lewis & Clark (Portland, OR, USA), Federal University of Mato Grosso (Brazil), Federal University Flumeinense (Rio de Janeiro, Brazil). Together with Professor Steven Johansen from The Northwestern School of Law of Lewsi&Clark she wrote a book "Legal Writing". In 2009 she was a Chairman of the Supervisory Council of the Riga International Airport and later became a member of the Board of Latvian Air Navigation Service Provider SJSC "Latvijas gaisa satiksme". In 2012 Broka was nominated a candidate for the office of mayor of Riga in the Riga City Council election. In 2017 Riga City Council election she was nominated a second time as a candidate for the office of mayor of Riga from National Alliance. In 2014 she was Minister of Justice of Latvia in the First Straujuma cabinet. Since 2008 elected as a member of the Governing Council of the International Institute for the Unification of Private Law (UNIDROIT). She has more than 30 scientific research papers in the field of Private Law (Contract Law, Consumer protection, Construction, Public Private Partnership, Aviation Law, Digital Currencies and Smart Contracts). Since June 2014 Baiba Broka is a President of Latvian Biathlon Federation and became a member of the Legal Committee of the International Biathlon Union (IBU). She has been a member of the executive committee of the Latvian Olympic Committee since 2017. Now she is a vice-chairperson of the Senate of the University of Latvia and Head of Rector's Office, deputy in Riga City Council and member of the board of the Riga Freeport Authority.

On 8 July 2019, she was detained by the Latvian corruption watchdog KNAB on suspicion of fraud in her role as University of Latvia deputy rector for legal affairs. At a press conference on 12 July 2019, Broka denied the accusations and stated she would suspend her activities as a member of the National Alliance party during the investigation. In late July 2019, Broka resigned from her post at the University of Latvia. All the members of the Latvian Biathlon Federation expressed unified support to Broka, and entrusted her and her team to lead the Latvian Biathlon federation. Broka continues to be a President of the Latvian Biathlon Federation, and in the season of 2020/2021 top Latvian biathletes -Andrejs Rastorgujevs 3rd time became a European Champion ( gold medalist) International Biathlon Union – IBU Baiba Bendika 1st International Biathlon Union – Athlete profile for Baiba BENDIKA time became a European Champion ( gold medalist) in the IBU Open European Championships. Great results are directly related to the leadership of B.Broka. Broka continues her academic career and restarted her professional activities providing financial and legal services, actively participates in the congresses and seminars with presentations in the field of international business transactions, investments, blockchain, decentralised finance.
