= United List =

Latvian political alliance

United List Apvienotais saraksts
- Abbreviation: AS
- Leader: Andris Kulbergs
- Chairman: Edvards Smiltēns; Edgars Tavars
- Founder: Uldis Pīlēns
- Founded: 1 July 2022
- Split from: Union of Greens and Farmers
- Headquarters: Riga
- Ideology: Regionalism; Green conservatism
- Political position: Centre to centre-right
- European Parliament group: European Conservatives and Reformists Group
- Members: Latvian Association of Regions; Latvian Green Party; Liepāja Party; NGO "Restart of Latvia"
- Saeima: 41 / 100
- European Parliament: 1 / 9

Website
- apvienotaissaraksts.lv

The United List (Latvian: Apvienotais saraksts, AS) is a regionalist and green conservative political alliance in Latvia established ahead of the 2022 parliamentary election. The list was formed by the Latvian Green Party, the Latvian Association of Regions, and the Liepāja Party, together with the "United List of Latvia" (Latvian: Apvienotais Latvijas saraksts) association led by Liepāja construction contractor Uldis Pīlēns.

== History ==
The idea for the electoral alliance, developed from May 2022 onwards, initially used the name "United List of Latvia" (Latvijas apvienotais saraksts). Initiated by Uldis Pīlēns, it sought to bring together political parties and non-partisan professionals in a common electoral list based on the earlier experience of the United List of Liepāja (Liepājas apvienotais saraksts). The non-governmental association created to support the project was scheduled to hold its founding event on 1 July and was to be named United List of Latvia (Apvienotais Latvijas saraksts).

One of the catalysts in the origins of the alliance was the refusal of the Green and Liepāja parties to work with their former Union of Greens and Farmers partners who had continued to promote Aivars Lembergs as its prime ministerial candidate despite his criminal conviction.

The alliance's joint candidate list for the 2022 Latvian parliamentary election was registered on 26 July 2022, with Didzis Šmits as the lead candidate, followed by Edvards Smiltēns, Edgars Tavars, Māris Kučinskis, and Juris Viļums. Pīlēns was announced as the alliance's candidate for Prime Minister, although he did not run as a parliamentary candidate. The United List received 100,631 votes (11.01%) and won 15 seats in the Saeima, becoming the third-largest parliamentary group.

On 6 December 2022, the United List announced its ministerial candidates as part of the coalition government formation process with New Unity and the National Alliance. Its nominees included the non-affiliated Līga Meņģelsone for Health Minister, Didzis Šmits for Agriculture Minister, Māris Kučinskis for Interior Minister, and Māris Sprindžuks for Minister for Environmental Protection and Regional Development.

The "United List of Latvia" NGO was renamed "U18" in December 2023 and to Restart of Latvia (or Latvian Restart, Latvijas Restarts) in February 2026. By this time, automotive businessman and Saeima member Andris Kulbergs had become its leader and chairman of the board, while not being a member of any of the parties within the alliance.

After the downfall of the Siliņa cabinet in May 2026, Kulbergs managed to form a temporary cabinet for the four months remaining until the next election. With Kulbergs leading the campaign, the United List won the 2026 Latvian parliamentary election with 283,750 votes (35.77%), winning 41 seats, the largest number of seats any party has won since the first Saeima election in 1922.

== Ideology and political position ==
The alliance places national security, effective state administration, and the development of a green economy among its main priorities. Its programme highlights the importance of the defence industry and a stronger NATO presence in the region. It also supports greater use of local renewable energy resources and sustainable economic development. In addition, the alliance advocates making referendums easier to initiate.

The alliance also emphasizes cooperation with European Union partners. Its economic priorities include reducing regional inequalities and promoting more balanced development across the country, particularly by supporting rural development and increasing political accountability to municipalities. It is also generally pro-Ukraine in foreign affairs.

The alliance has variously been described as centrist, centre-right and right-wing.

== Members ==
Party	Ideology	Position	Leader	Saeima	MEPs
Latvian Association of Regions; Latvijas Reģionu apvienība	Centrism; Regionalism	Centre	Edvards Smiltēns	18 / 100	0 / 9
Latvian Green Party; Latvijas Zaļā partija	Green politics; Social conservatism	Centre-right	Edgars Tavars	13 / 100	0 / 9
Liepāja Party; Liepājas partija	Localism; Liepāja interests	Centre	Uldis Sesks	3 / 100	0 / 9
Independents: NGO Restart of Latvia (Latvijas Restarts), led by Andris Kulbergs				6 / 100	1 / 9

Associate members

- Izaugsme (cooperation agreement with LRA since at least 2026, 1 seat in the Saeima)

== Election results ==
=== Legislative elections ===
Election	Leader	Performance					Rank	Government
Election	Leader	Votes	%	± pp	Seats	+/–	Rank	Government
2022	Uldis Pīlēns	100,631	11.01	New	15 / 100	New	3rd	Coalition (2022–2023)
2022	Uldis Pīlēns	100,631	11.01	New	15 / 100	New	3rd	Opposition (2023–2026)
2022	Uldis Pīlēns	100,631	11.01	New	15 / 100	New	3rd	Coalition (2026)
2026	Andris Kulbergs	283,892	35.76	▲24.75	41 / 100	▲26	1st	Coalition

=== European Parliament elections ===
Election	Party leader	Performance					Rank	EP Group
Election	Party leader	Votes	%	± pp	Seats	+/–	Rank	EP Group
2024	Reinis Pozņaks	42,551	8.27	New	1 / 9	New	4th	ECR
