= Uldis Pīlēns =

Latvian businessman, politician and architect

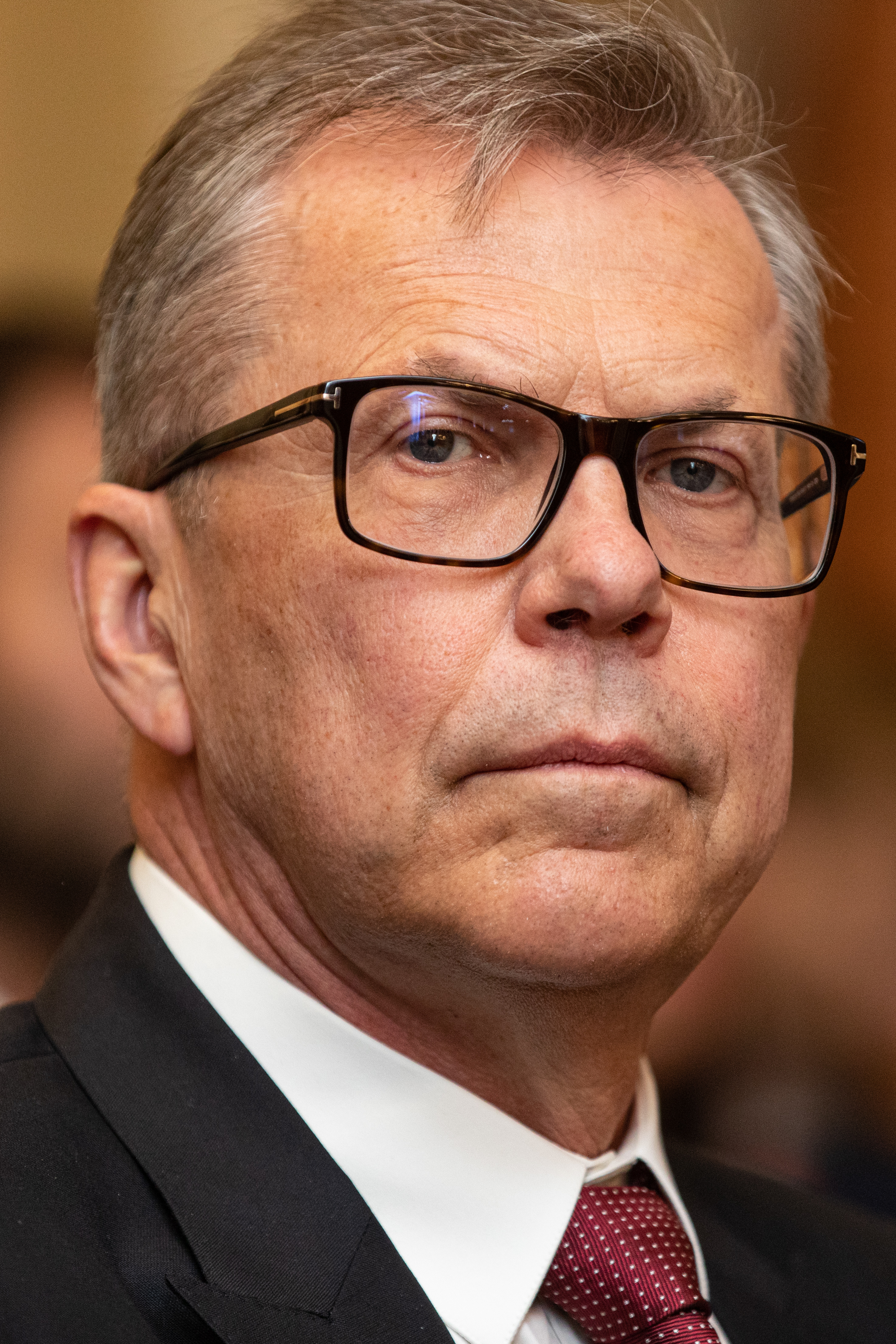
- Pīlēns in 2023

Personal details
- Born: 2 October 1956 (age 70) Liepāja, Latvian Soviet Socialist Republic, USSR (now Latvia)
- Party: United List (since 2022)
- Other political affiliations: People's Party (1998–2009)
- Education: Riga Technical University
- Occupation: Architect, businessman, politician.

Uldis Pīlēns (born 2 October 1956) is a Latvian architect, businessman and politician.

== Early life and education ==
He was born on 2 October 1956 in Liepāja. He studied at the 5th secondary school in Liepāja, in 1974 he started as a judge at the Faculty of Architecture of the Riga Technical University, which he continued at the Weimar School of Architecture and Construction (1976–1980) in the then East Germany.

== Architectural career ==
After returning to Latvia, Uldis Pīlēns worked at the Institute of Scientific-Technical Information and Technical-Economic Research of the Latvian SSR as the head of the design center (1981–1983), he was a member of the Bureau of Technical Aesthetics Problems Council of the State Plan Committee of the Latvian SSR. In 1983, he was admitted to the Association of Young Artists of the Union of Artists of the USSR.

From 1983 to 1988, Pīlēns was the chief architect of the city of Liepāja.

During the regaining of Latvia's independence in 1990, he founded the architectural cooperative V–10, and in 1991, SIA "Arhitekta U. Pīlēna birojs" (UPB). He was the president of the V-10 club (1995–2006).

In 1997, U. Pīlēns became chairman of the board of AS UPB, chairman of the board of Liepāja SEZ and freelance adviser to the chairman of Liepāja city council, in 1999 a trustee and deputy chairman of Latvenergo.

In 2001, he left the position of Liepaja SEZ board member and worked in private business, was chairman of the board of JSC UPB (1997–2015), then chairman of the board, founder and long-time manager of UPB Holding, as well as chairman of the board of JSC MBD (2001–2018), SIA Member of the board of AILE R (2003–2005), chairman of the board of AS MB Betons (2007–2015), then deputy chairman of the board, chairman of the board of AS Ola Foundation.

From 2017 to 2020, he was a member of the board of SIA "Integral Education Institute".

== Political career ==
Participated in the foundation of the Liepāja region branch of the People's Party, was a member of the board of the People's Party (1998–2008), deputy of the Liepāja City Council (2005–2009).

In May 2022, Pīlēns announced the establishment of the "Latvian United List" election association, and in July, the establishment of the "United List of Latvia" association, which became a member of the United List alliance.

== Books ==
- Mans uzņēmēja kods. Rīga: Apgāds Zvaigzne ABC, 2018
