= Dzintars Rasnačs =

Latvian politician

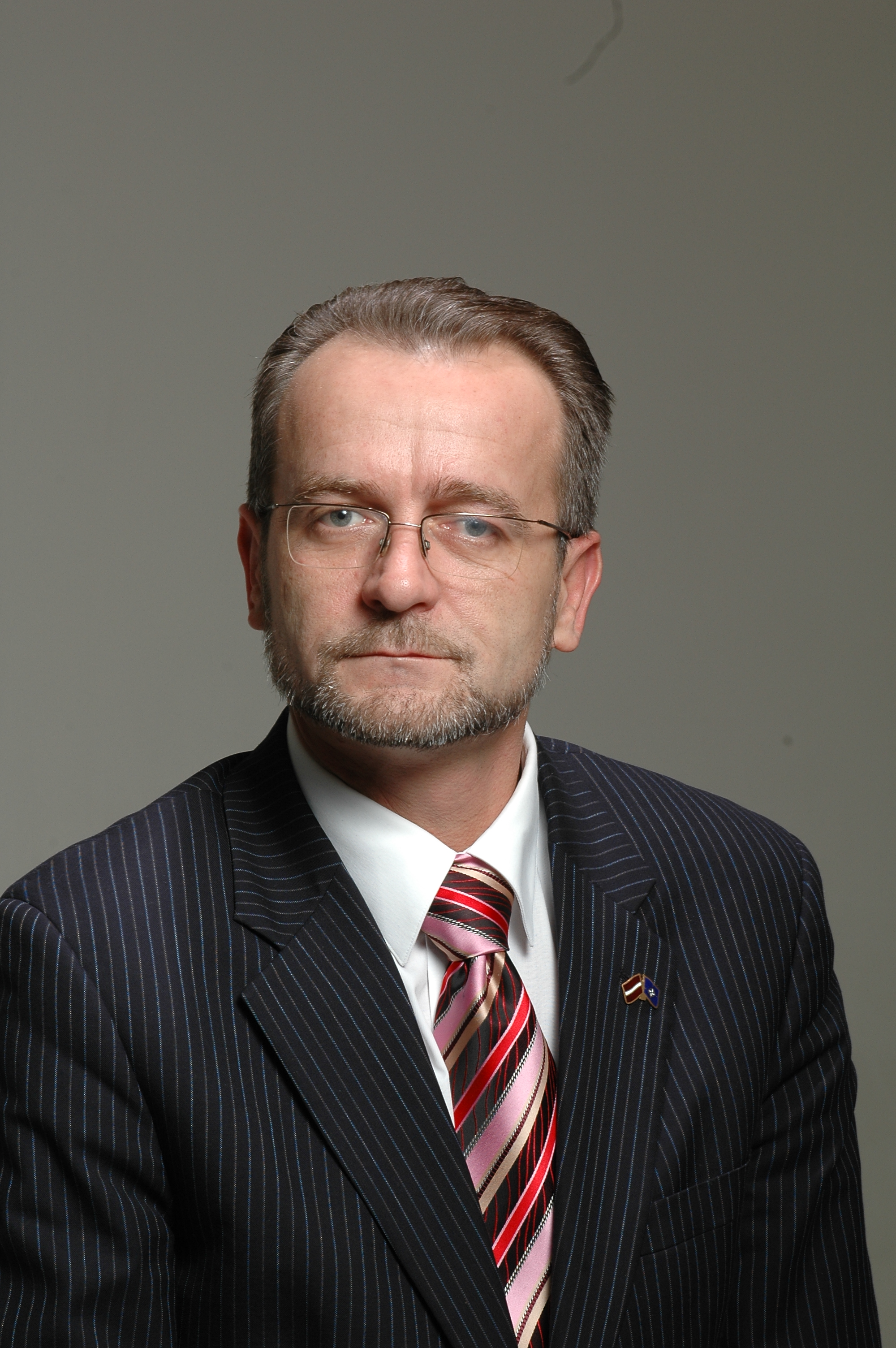

Deputy of the Saeima

Personal details
- Born: 17 July 1963 (age 63) Jūrmala, Latvian SSR
- Party: National Alliance
- Education: University of Latvia
- Profession: Lawyer

Dzintars Rasnačs (born 17 July 1963) is a Latvian politician. He is a member of the National Alliance Party and a deputy of the 11th Saeima (Latvian Parliament). He began his current term in parliament on 17 October 2011. He has graduated from the University of Latvia.

From 1995 to 1998 and 2014 to 2019, he was Minister of Justice.
