= Gaiziņkalns Nature Park =

Protected landscape area

Gaizinkalns Nature Park
- IUCN category II (national park)
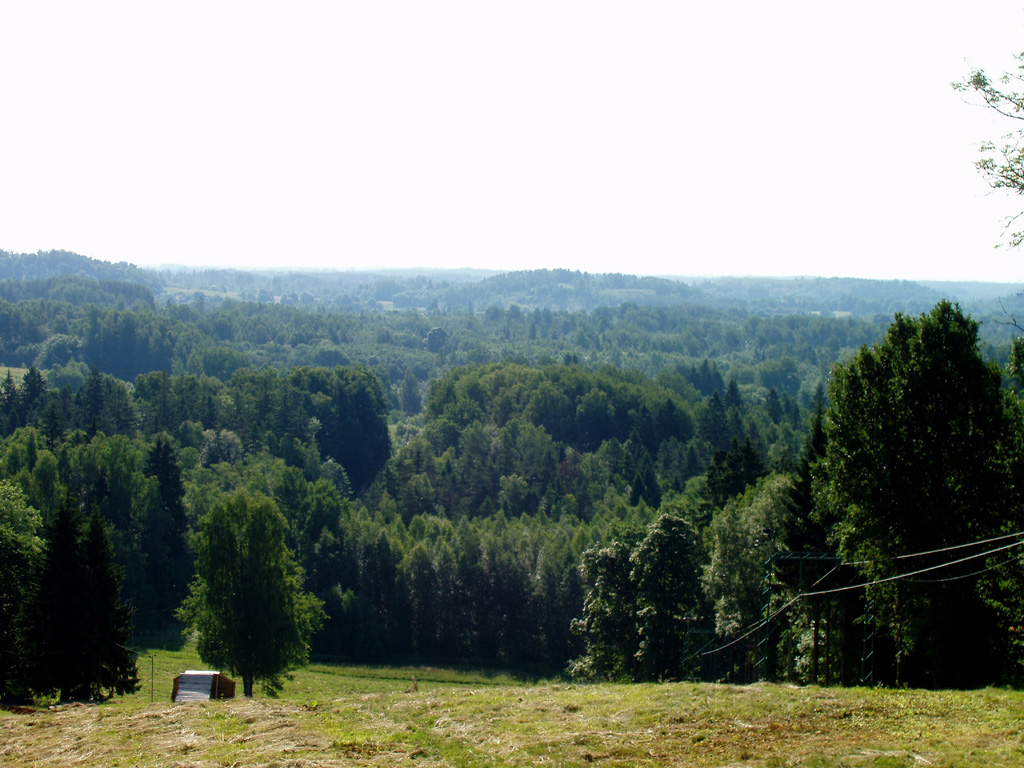
- Southeast slope of Gaizinkalns

- Location within Latvia
- Location: Latvia, Latgalia
- Coordinates: 56°53′00″N 25°57′00″E
- Area: 20.00 km^{2} (7.72 sq mi)
- Established: 1957

Gaiziņkalns Nature Park can be found in Latvia in Madona Municipality Vestienas, Aronas and Bērzaunes parishes, Natura 2000 territory. The territory of the park covers Vidzeme Uplands around Gaizinkalns, Lake Talejas and Lake Viešūrs (Lake Kaķīša), as well as several small lakes. Here is the highest place in Latvia - Gaizinkalns - 311.94 m.

== Characteristics ==
Gaiziņkalns and the surrounding hills have steep slopes overgrown with forest. The forest covers 70% of the park territory. These are mainly spruce or small oak and birch groves. Half of the 25 highest peaks of Latvia, which exceed 270 meters above sea level, are located in the park or near it territory. Gaizinkalns Nature Park belongs to the Vestiena Protected Landscape.

== History ==
The summit of Gaizinkalns has been protected since 1957, while the entire hill has been protected since 1977. Gaizinkalns Nature Park in its current area (2026 ha) was founded in 1987. The current status of the nature park is determined by the "Regulations on Nature Parks" adopted by the Cabinet of Ministers of the Republic of Latvia on 2 March 1999. On 14 December 2012, the 45 meter high Gaizinkalns observation tower, which has been built during the Soviet era in Latvia, was blown up.

== Flora ==
Among the protected plant species are Androsace filiformis, Corallorhiza trifida, Dactylorhiza incarnata, Cardamine bulbifera, Myriophyllum alterniflorum, Salix myrtilloides, Agrimonia pilosa, Conioselinum tataricum, Primula farinosa, Iris sibirica, Gladiolus imbricatus, Platanthera chlorantha, Dactylorhiza maculata, Dactylorhiza majalis subsp. baltica and Dactylorhiza incarnata. Lichens such as Pleurosticta acetabulum and Arthonia vinosa also grow there.

== Fauna ==
Among the mammals there are wolves, lynxes, badgers, red deer, squirrels, wild boars, wild goats, elk, stoats, Eurasian otters, beavers, common shrew and Eurasian pygmy shrew. Many species of bats live in the protected area, such as brown long-eared bat, pond bat, northern bat, Daubenton's bat, common pipistrelle and the Nathusius's pipistrelle. Among the birds that live there are species of white stork, black stork, common merganser, common goldeneye, black grouse, common crane, corn crake, hazel grouse, grey partridge, common tern, black-headed gull, European nightjar, red-backed shrike, black woodpecker, white-backed woodpecker, Eurasian three-toed woodpecker and red-breasted flycatcher.

== See also ==
- Gaiziņkalns
- Vidzeme Upland
