= Vestiena Protected Landscape =

Protected area in Latvia

- IUCN category V (protected landscape/seascape)
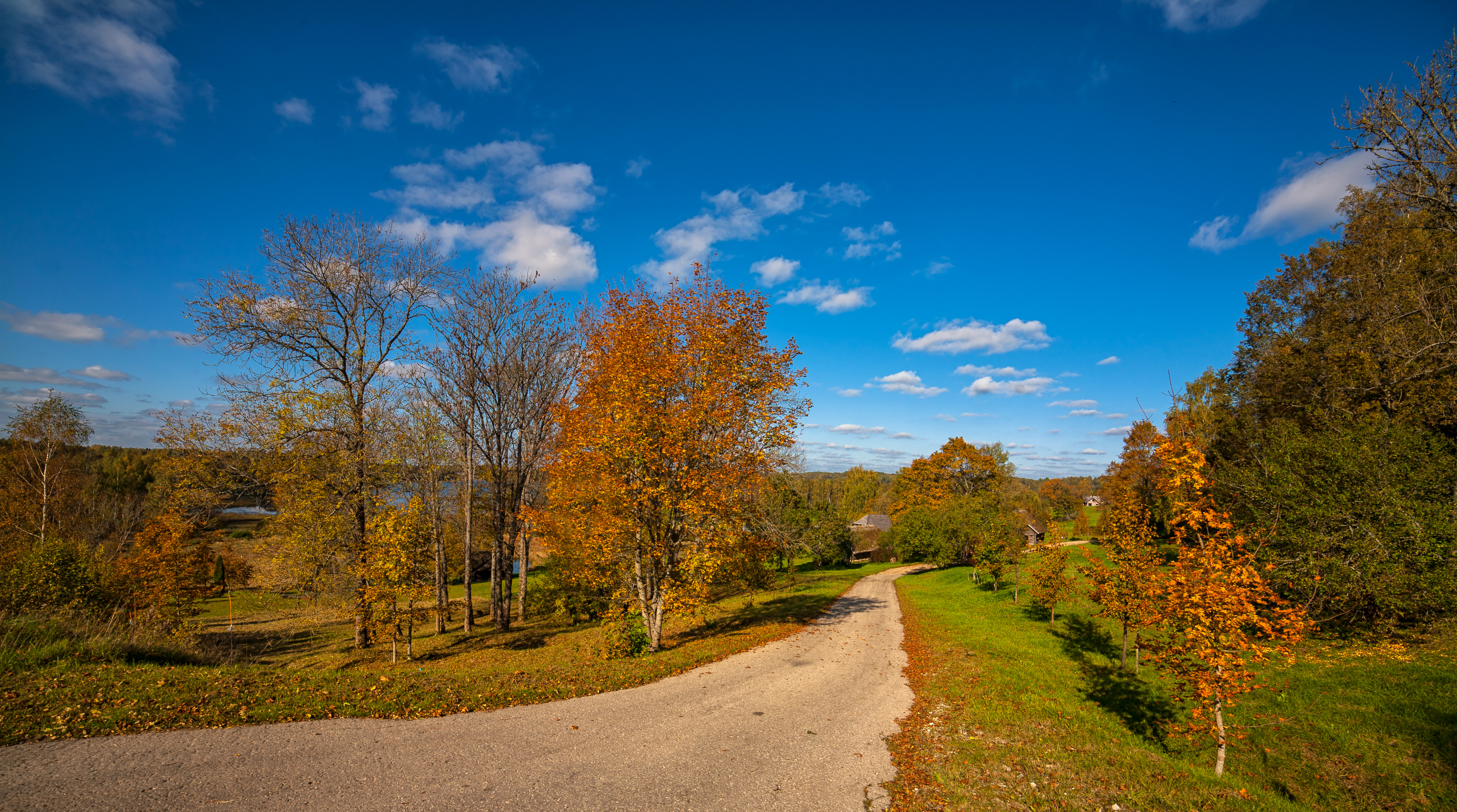

- Location within Latvia
- Interactive map of Vestiena Protected Landscape
- Location: Latvia
- Coordinates: 56°52′49″N 25°54′58″E Latvia, Ērgļi Municipality Ērgļi Parish, Jumurda parish, Madona Municipality Arona parish, Bērzaune parish, Vestiena parish.
- Area: 271.15 km^{2} (104.69 sq mi)
- Established: 1977
- Governing body: Environmental Protection Board

Vestiena is protected landscape in Ērgļi Municipality and Madona Municipality, approximately from Ērgļi Parish in the west to village Zelgauska in the east. The territory was established to preserve and protect the Vidzeme Highlands landscape and natural diversity. This is a Natura 2000 site.

== Geography ==
The Vestiena Protected Landscape Area includes the central part of the Vidzeme Highlands with the highest peak in Latvia - Gaiziņkalns - as well as other surrounding large hills, the height of which exceeds 270 meters above sea level (Sirdskalns hill, Abrienas hill, Bolēnu hill and others). The territory includes both scenically and biologically valuable group of Vestiena lakes - lake Kāla, lake Talejas, lake Ilziņa and others.

The territory includes Gaizinkalns Nature Park, nature reserves Lake Ilzina and Kala lake islands, nature monuments Bolēnu spring, as well as Vestiena manor alley.

== Flora ==
A large number of protected plant species can be found here: broomrape (Orobanche pallidiflora), hairy agrimony (Agrimonia pilosa), gladiolus (Gladiolus imbricatus), early marsh-orchid (Dactylorhiza incarnata).

== Fauna ==
Protect fauna species can be found here: beetle (Graphoderus bilineatus), large white-faced darter (Leucorrhinia pectoralis), butterfly purple emperor (Apatura iris), land snail (Ena montana), spined loach (Cobitis taenia), European bullhead (Cottus gobio), brook lamprey (Lampetra planeri), lesser spotted eagle (Aquila pomarina), corn crake (Crex crex), European nightjar (Caprimulgus europaeus), woodlark (Lullula arborea), barred warbler (Sylvia nisoria), Eurasian otter (Lutra lutra), pond bat (Myotis dasycneme).

== See also ==
- List of protected areas of Latvia
