= Lake Viešūrs =

Lake in Latvia

Viešūrs
- Kaķīša ezers, Viešurs, Vesenberga ezers, Viesienas ezers, Tulderu ezers
- Viešūrs (Latvian)
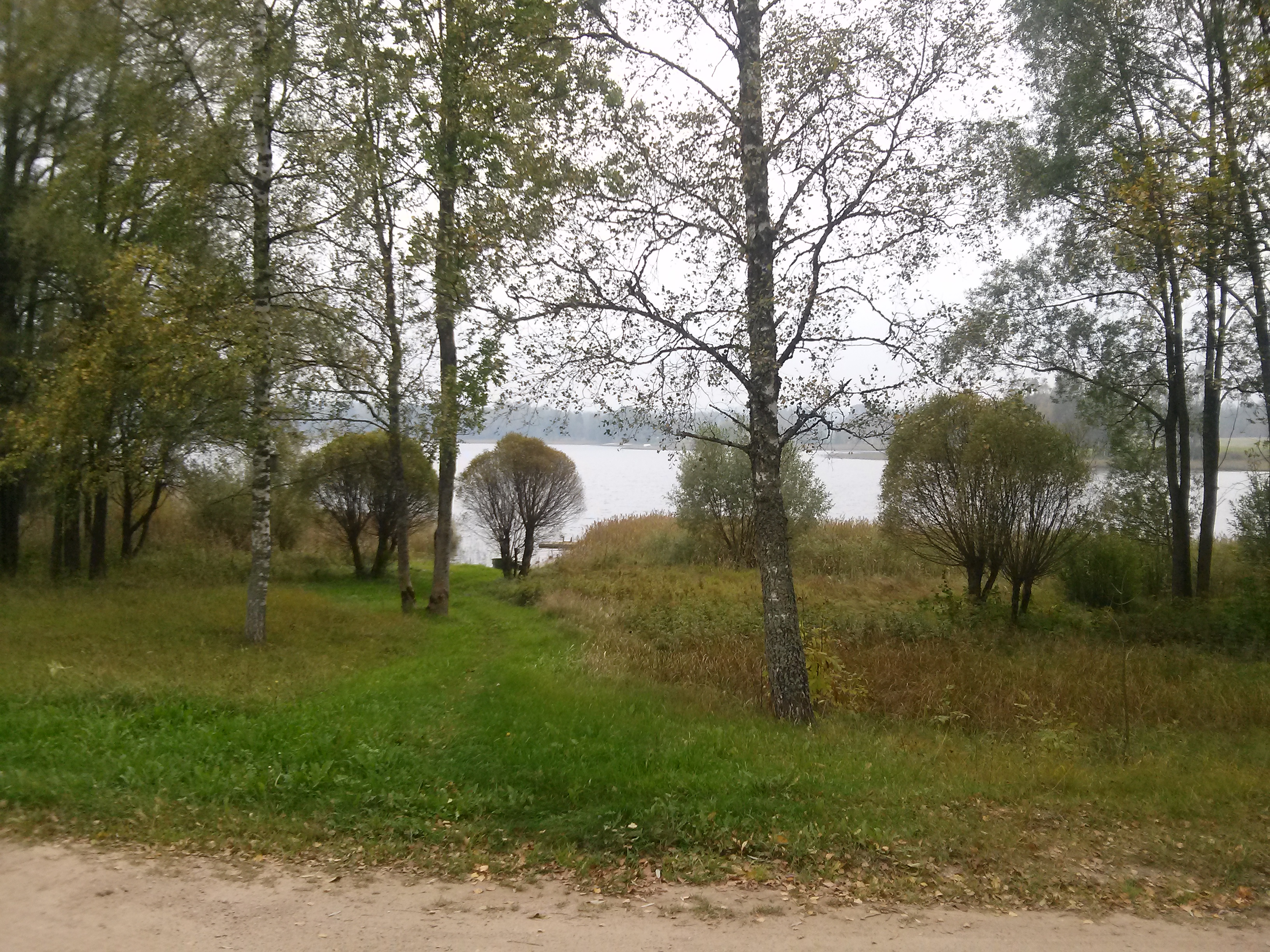

- Location within Latvia
- Location: Vestiena Parish, Madona Municipality
- Coordinates: 56°53′51″N 25°58′9″E
- Type: Glacial
- Primary inflows: 7 small inflows, underwater springs
- Primary outflows: Viešupe
- Catchment area: 11.5 km^{2} (4.4 sq mi)
- Basin countries: Latvia
- Designation: Gaizinkalns Nature Park
- Max. length: 2.4 km (1.5 mi)
- Surface area: 1.76 km^{2} (0.68 sq mi)
- Average depth: 5.2 m (17 ft)
- Max. depth: 35.0 m (114.8 ft)
- Surface elevation: 221.6 m (727 ft)
- Islands: Cepurīte, Kaķu sala
- Settlements: Devēna, Tropeles
- References: www.ezeri.lv

Viešūrs (also Kaķīša ezers, Viešurs, Vesenberga ezers, Viesienas ezers, Tulderu ezers, etc.) is a lake in Vestiena Parish, Madona Municipality, Latvia. It is located on the border with Arona Parish, 3 kilometres (1.9 mi) north of Gaiziņkalns. It is a lake of glacial origin and is included in the Gaiziņkalns Nature Park. The lake bed is springy and sandy, with a layer of mud and sapropel up to 3 meters (9.8 ft) thick in some places. The shores are mostly steep. Viešupe flows out from the northern part of the lake towards Lielais Līdēris lake. There is a dam on the Viešupe. The lake has seven small inflows. Publicly accessible swimming areas are located on the southeastern shore near Kalnmuiža Bay. An anoxic (oxygen-free) zone begins at a depth of 9.5 meters (31 ft). Twelve species of fish have been recorded in the lake.

An unusual spring, Laparts, flows into the lake bed and is said to operate every seven years. The Tropeles burial ground is located on the northwestern coast, and the Kalnamūžu Velnakmens (Kalnamūža Devil's Stone) is in the southeast. The park of Devēna Manor and a forest trail are located on the eastern shore.

== Toponyms of Viešūrs ==
- Cepurīte — a small island in the central-northern part (0.15 ha)
- Devēnas līcis (Devēna Bay) — in the southwestern part
- Dietlāvju līcis (Dietlāvji Bay) — in the northeast
- Kaķu sala (Cat Island) — in the southwestern part (0.15 ha)
- Kalnmuižas līcis / Kalnamūžu līcis (Kalnmuiža Bay) — in the southern part
- Sesku līcis (Polecat Bay) — in the northwest
