= List of protected areas of Latvia =

The Baltic nation of Latvia is home to several protected areas, which receive protection because of their environmental, cultural or similar value.

The total area of Latvia’s protected terrestrial territories is 11,726 km^{2} (4,527 sq mi), which amounts to approximately 18.18% of the country’s territory. In addition 4,631 km^{2} (1,788 sq mi) of marine area protected, or 16.04% of the country’s territorial waters. Total number of protected areas — 1118. In Latvia there are 4 Strict Nature Reserves, 4 National Parks, 261 Managed Nature Reserves, 325 Natural Monuments, 6 Ramsar sites and 9 Protected Landscape.

== Managed Reserves ==
In Latvia there are 294 Managed Nature Reserves.

== Ramsar sites ==
In Latvia there are 6 Ramsar Sites.

- Lake Engure (Latvian: Engures ezers),
- Lake Kaņieris (Latvian: Ķemeru Nacionālā parka teritorija),
- Lubana wetland complex (Latvian: Lubāna mitrājs),
- Northern Bogs (Latvian: Ziemeļu purvi),
- Pape Wetland Complex (Latvian: Pape),
- Teiči and Pelecare bogs (Latvian: Teiču purvs, Latvian: Pelečāres purvs).

== Protected Landscapes ==
In Latvia there are 9 Protected Landscapes.

- Ādaži
- Augšdaugava
- Augšzeme
- Kaučers
- Nīcgales Meži
- Veclaicene
- Vecpiebalga
- Vestiena
- Ziemeļgauja

== See also ==
- List of national parks of Latvia
- Environmental issues in Latvia
