= Vestiena Manor =

Manor house in Latvia

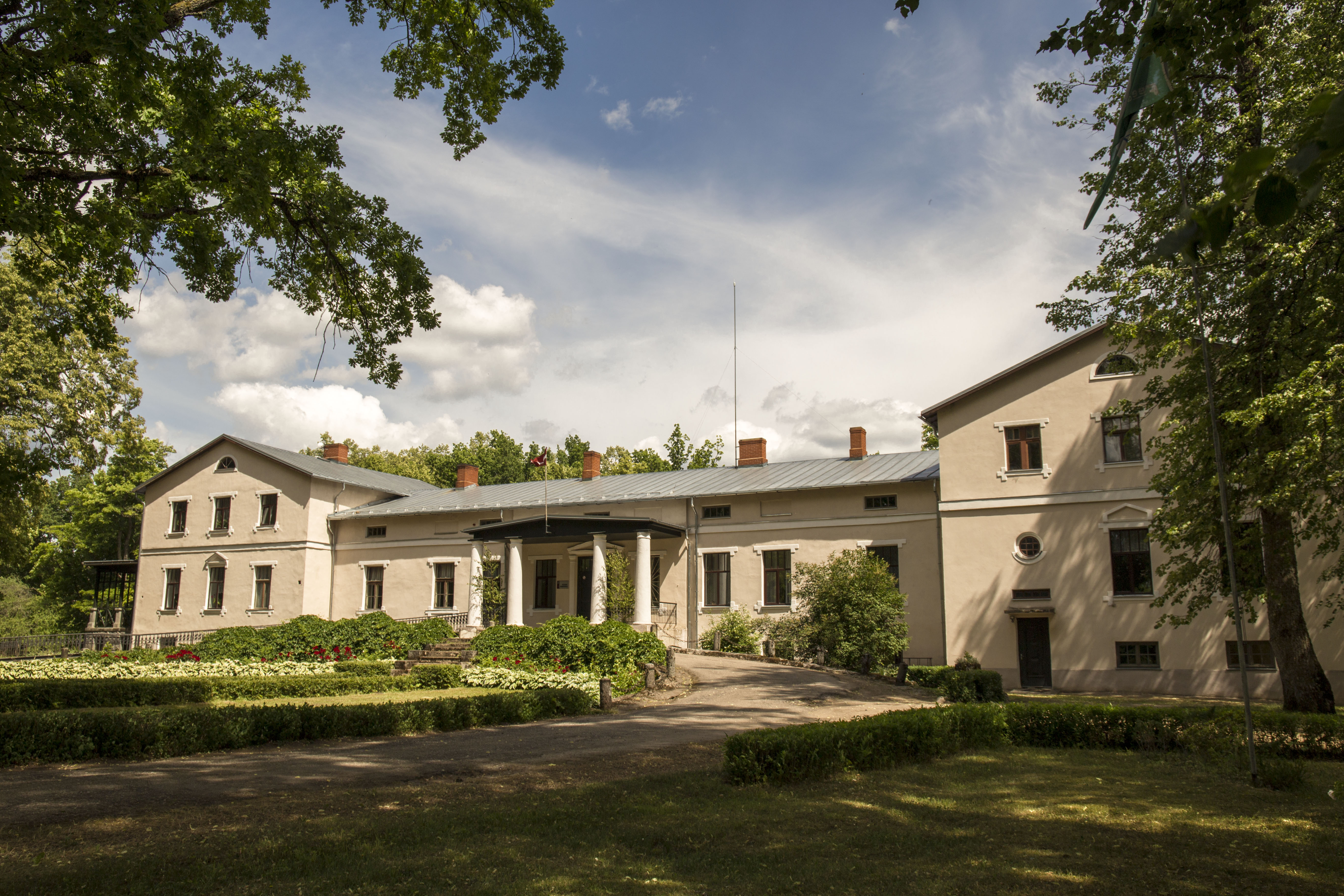

- Location within Latvia

General information
- Location: Vidzeme, Latvia
- Coordinates: 56°52′00″N 25°52′26″E
- Client: Tiesenhausen family

Vestiena Manor (Latvian: Vestienas muižas pils) is a manor house in the Vestiena Parish of Madona Municipality in the Vidzeme region of Latvia.

== History ==
Vestiena Manor was first mentioned in historical records in 1452 under the name Heinrich Tolka Manor at fortification. Archbishopric of Riga owned territory with all three neighboring manors - Vestiena, Tolka and Deven — from the 14th to the 16th century. Riga's Archbishops vassal E. Tīzenhauzen was managing Vestiena Manor since 1452. Tīzenhauzens family, reigned next 168 years. They were the first of nine noble families that owned the Vestiena manor over the years. The last private owner of Vestiena Manor was Aleksandrs Rušmanis, a Latvian citizen who bought it after 1905 fire and partly restored.

== Conversion from military bastion into manor house ==
In 18th century former rural fortification — bastion — was replaced with Vestiena Manor complex, which didn't have any military purpose. Bastion's moats were converted into picturesque ponds. Main manor house was again modernized in the first half of the 19th century with additions of hulls and porch, which gave it appearance of late Classical architecture style. After the 1905 fire, manor house was rebuilt one more time. From the 1920s manor house hosted agricultural school, then agricultural mechanization school. Since 1960 it has housed the Vestiena primary school.

== See also ==
- List of palaces and manor houses in Latvia
