= Haanja (disambiguation) =

Haanja (Võro: Haani; German: Hahnshof) is a village in Estonia.

Haanja may also refer to:

- Haanja Parish, Estonia
- Haanja Upland, Estonia
