= List of extreme points of Latvia =

Extreme points of Latvia

The extreme points of Latvia are the points on Latvia's land territory that are furthest north, south, east and west.

== Latitude and longitude ==
- North: (58.085137°N 25.199204°E) Ipiķi Parish, Valmiera Municipality
- South: (55.674971°N 26.597214°E) Demene Parish, Augšdaugava Municipality
- West: (56.353934°N 20.970154°E) Cape Bernāti, Nīca Parish, South Kurzeme Municipality
- East: (56.276911°N 28.241043°E) Pasiene Parish, Ludza Municipality

=== Latvija saules zīmē ===
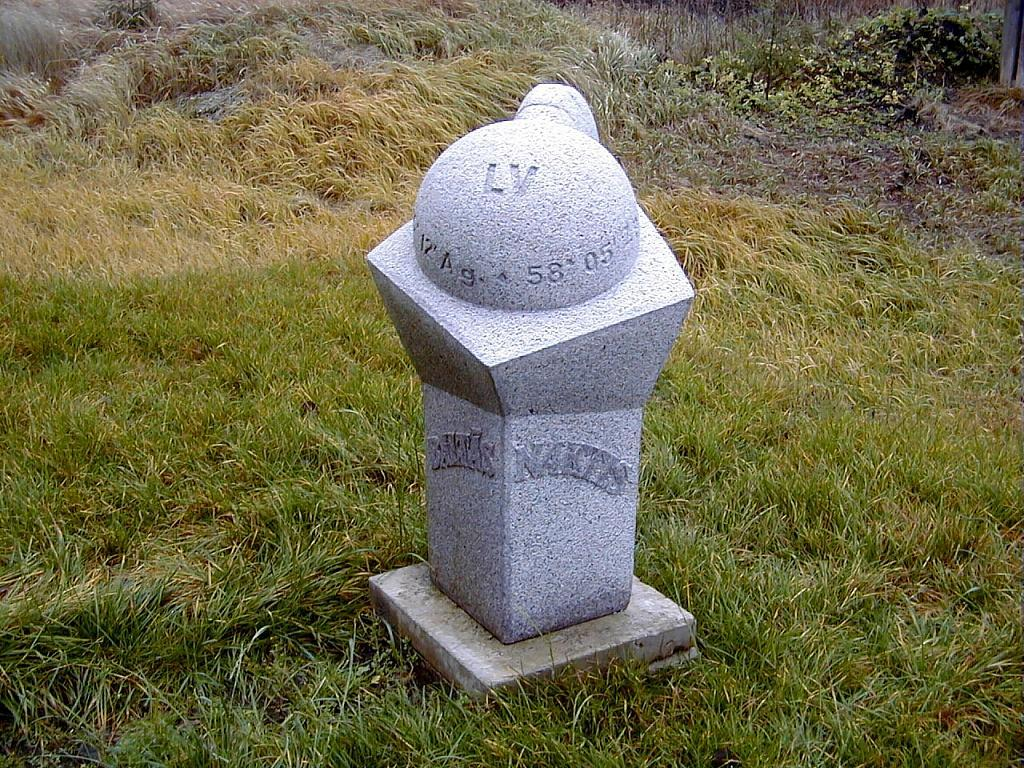
Baltās naktis

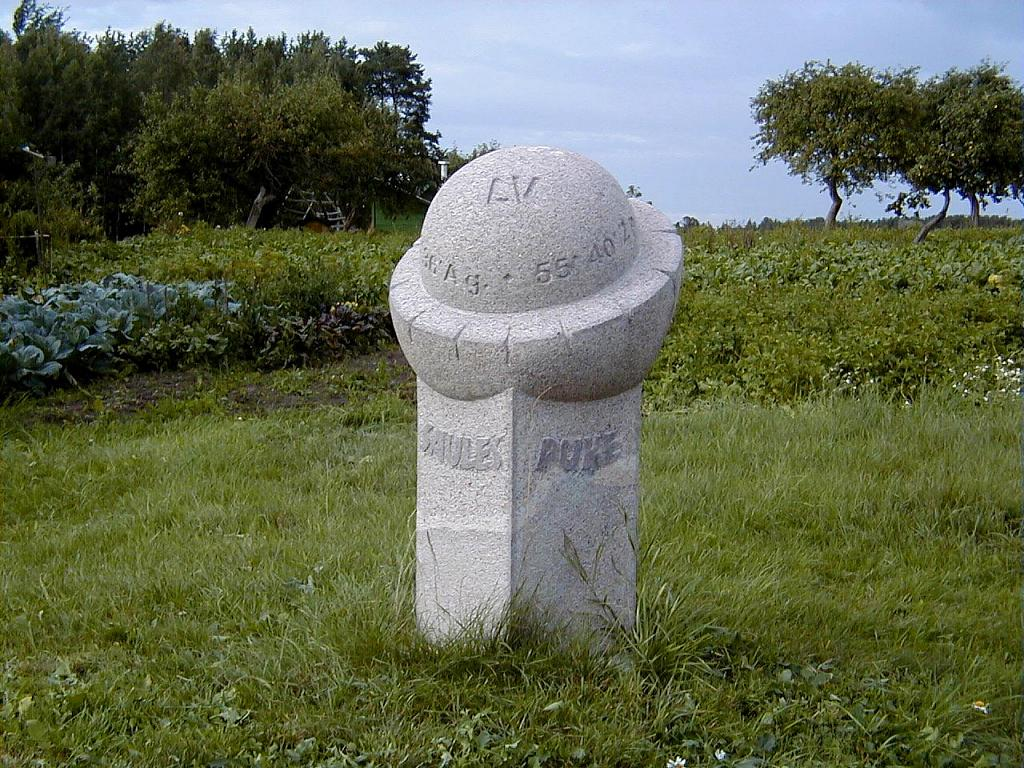
Saules puķe

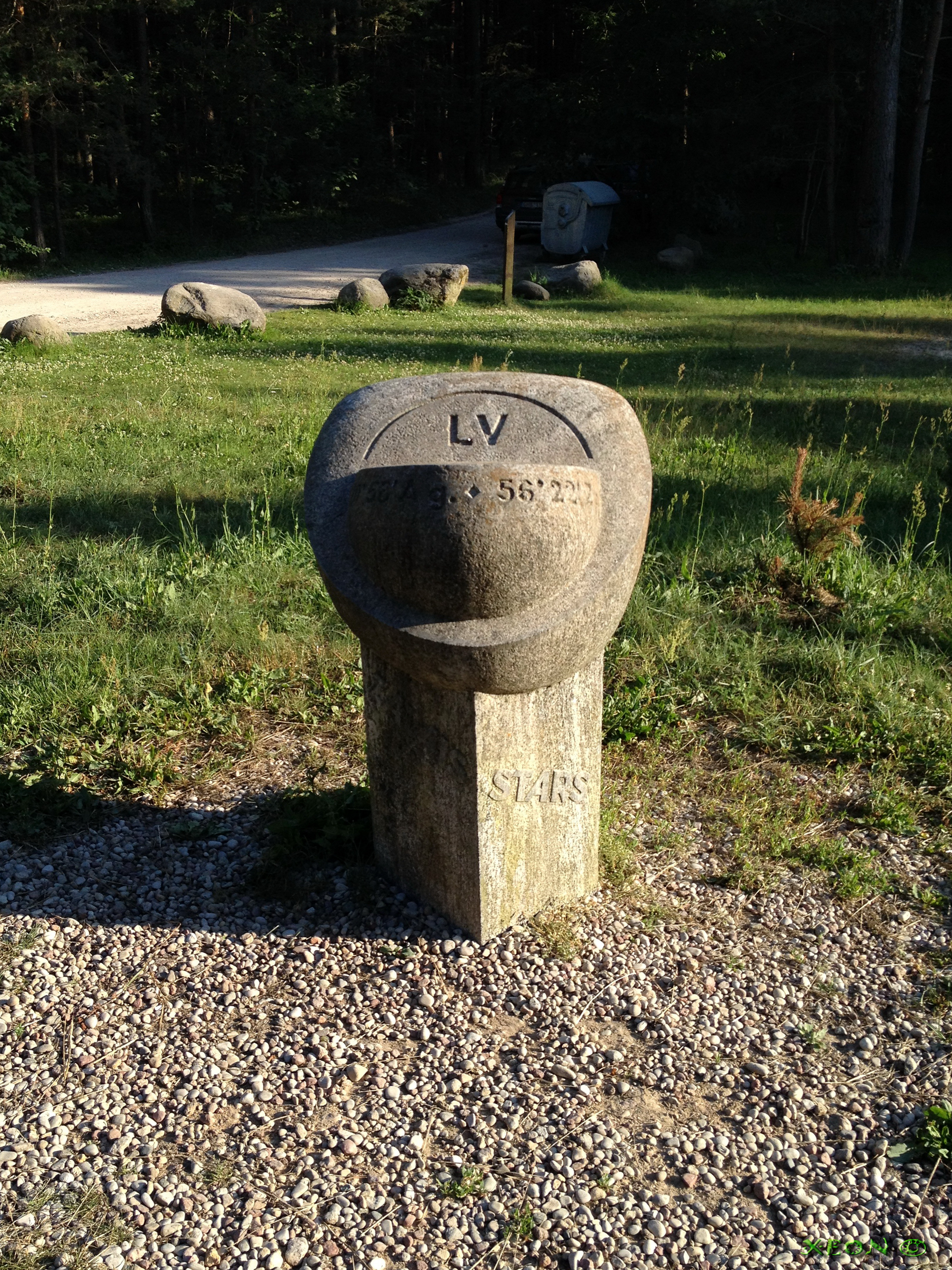
Zaļais stars

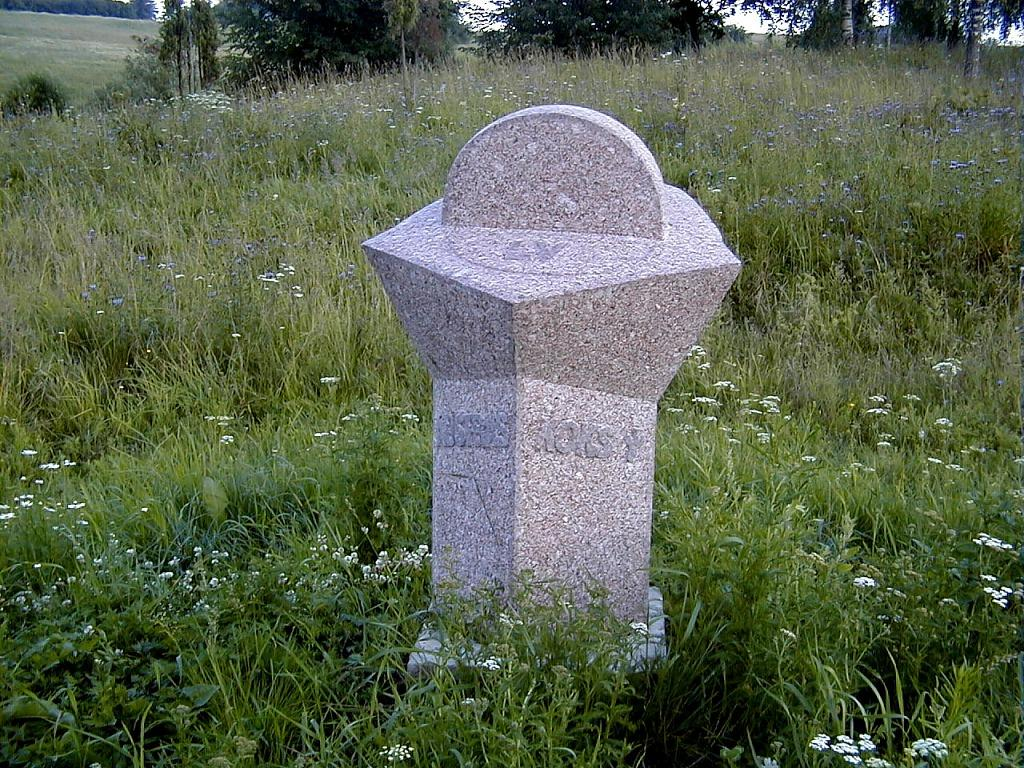
Austras koks

In 1998 and 1999, in honour of the 80th anniversary of Latvia's independence, four granite sculptures by Vilnis Titāns (1944–2006) were placed near each of Latvia's extreme points. The project was called Latvija saules zīmē, "Latvia in the Sun sign". The names and locations of the individual sculptures are as follows:

- North: (58.078378°N 25.190973°E) Baltās naktis ("White nights")
- South: (55.675561°N 26.582125°E) Saules puķe ("Sunflower")
- West: (56.377257°N 20.978954°E) Zaļais stars ("Green ray")
- East: (56.174953°N 28.094401°E) Austras koks ("Tree of Dawn")

== Extremes in elevation ==
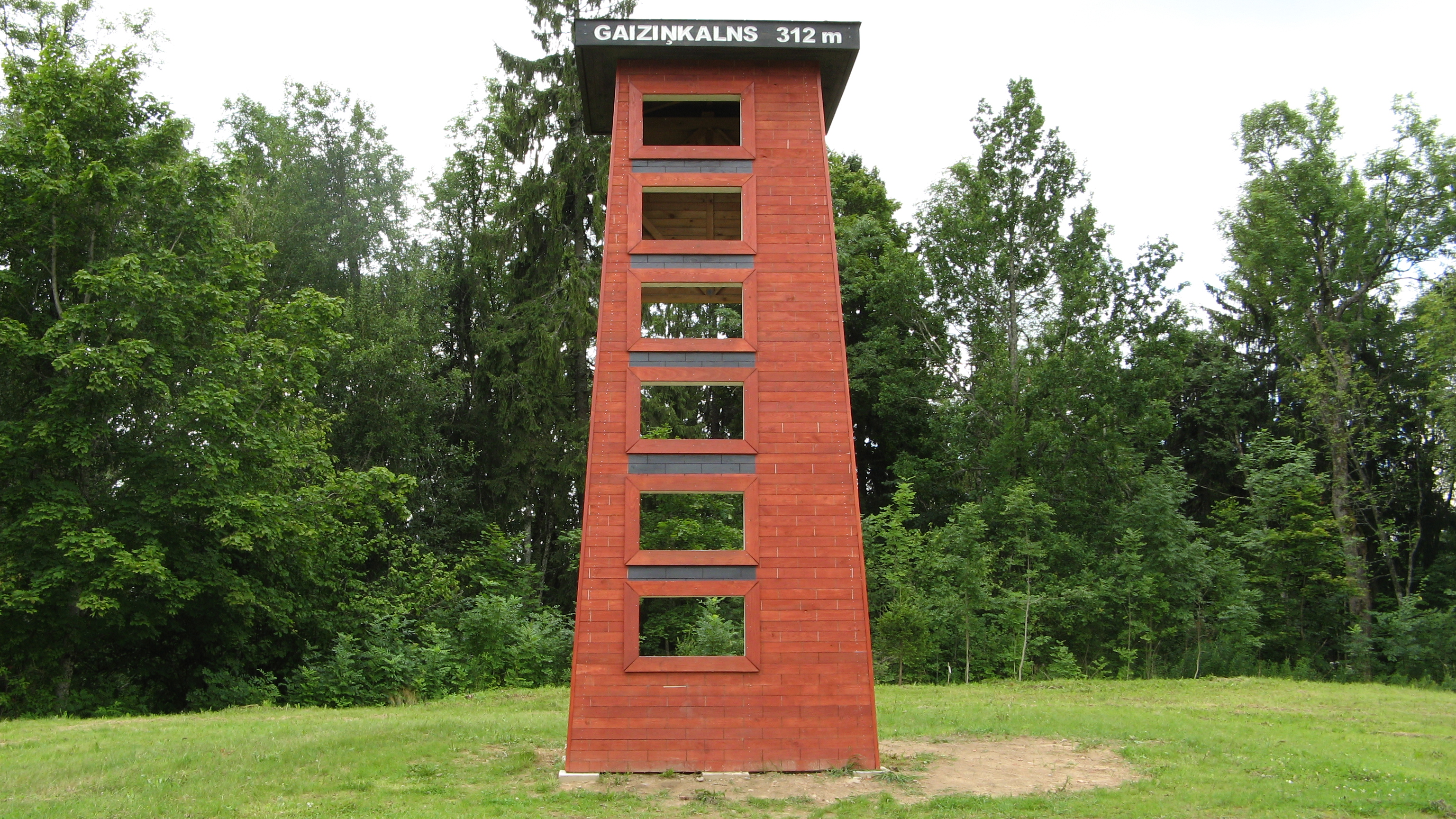
Monument at summit of Gaiziņkalns, the highest point in Latvia. It is a model of the observation tower that stood on top of Gaiziņkalns until it was demolished in 2012.

- Maximum: Gaiziņkalns (56.870134°N 25.95751°E), 312 metres (1,024 ft)
- Minimum: Baltic Sea, 0 meters

== See also ==
- Geography of Latvia
- Extreme points of Earth
