= Geography of Latvia =

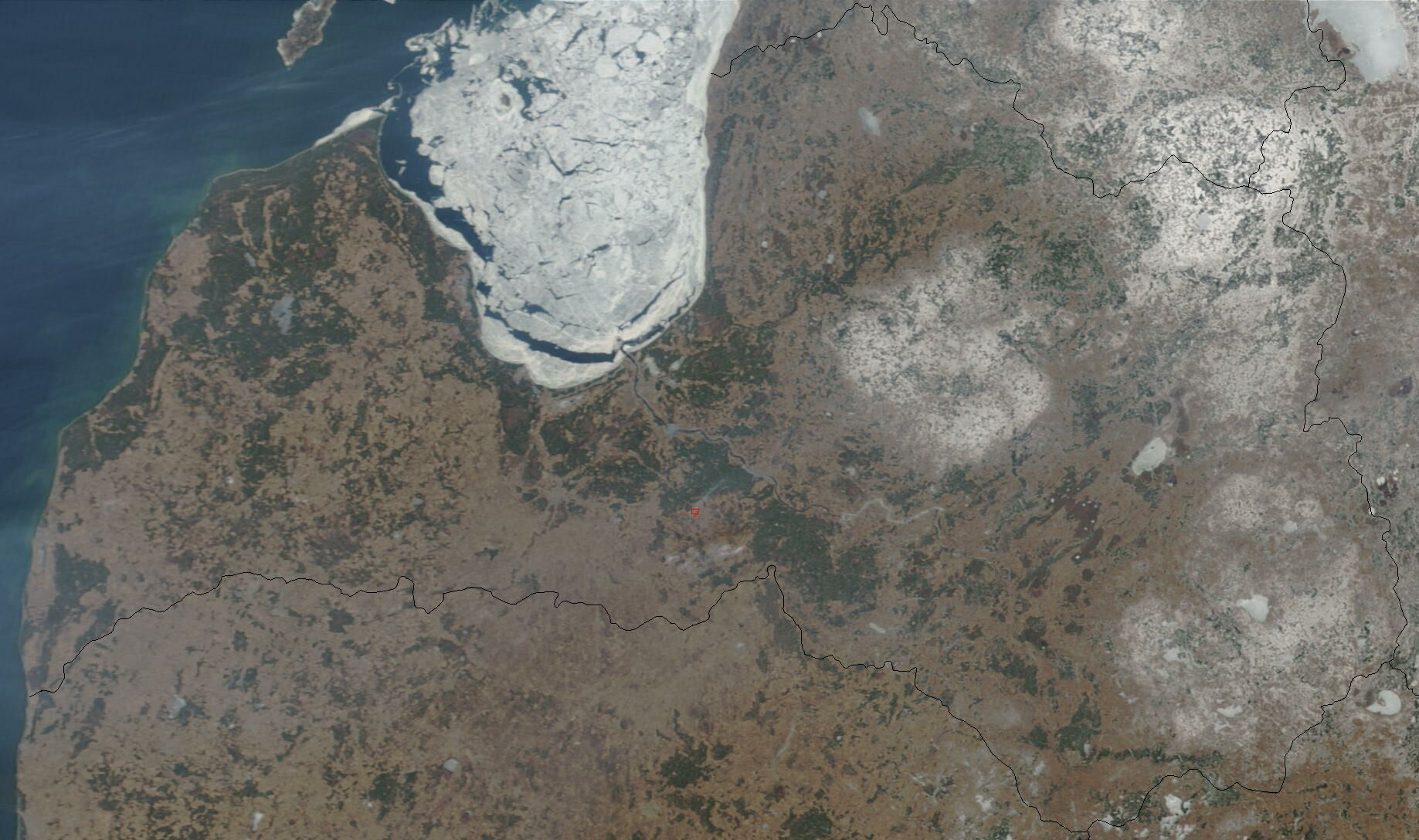
- Continent: Europe
- Region: Northern Europe
- Area
  - Total: 64,559 km^{2} (24,926 sq mi)
  - Land: 96.38%
  - Water: 3.62%
- Coastline: 498 km (309 mi)
- Borders: Total land borders: 1,382 km (859 mi)
- Highest point: Gaizinkalns; 312 m (1,024 ft)
- Lowest point: Baltic Sea; 0 meters
- Longest river: Gauja River; 452 km (281 mi)
- Largest lake: Lake Lubāns; 25 km^{2} (9.7 mi^{2})
- Exclusive economic zone: 28,452 km^{2} (10,985 mi^{2})

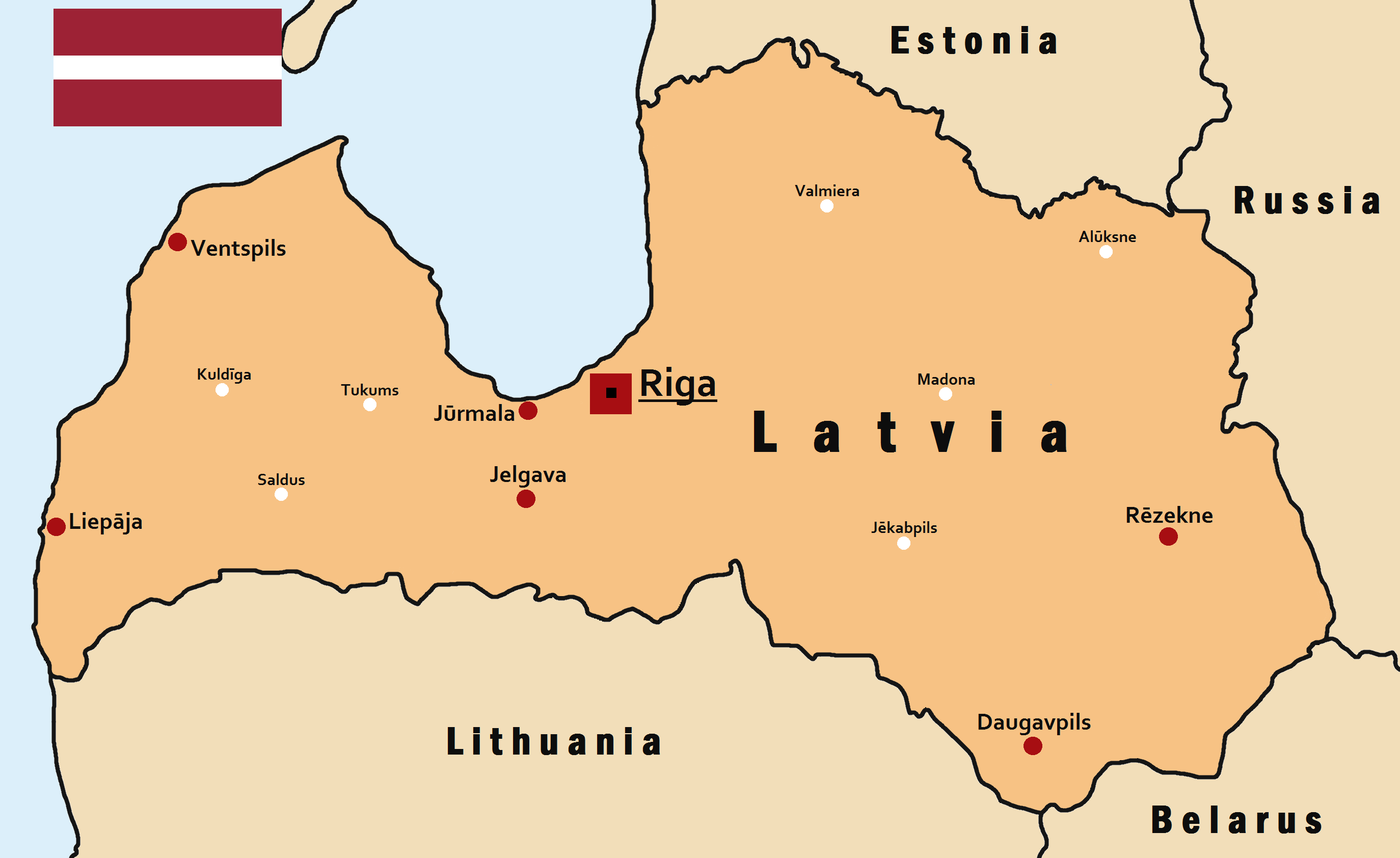
Political map of Latvia

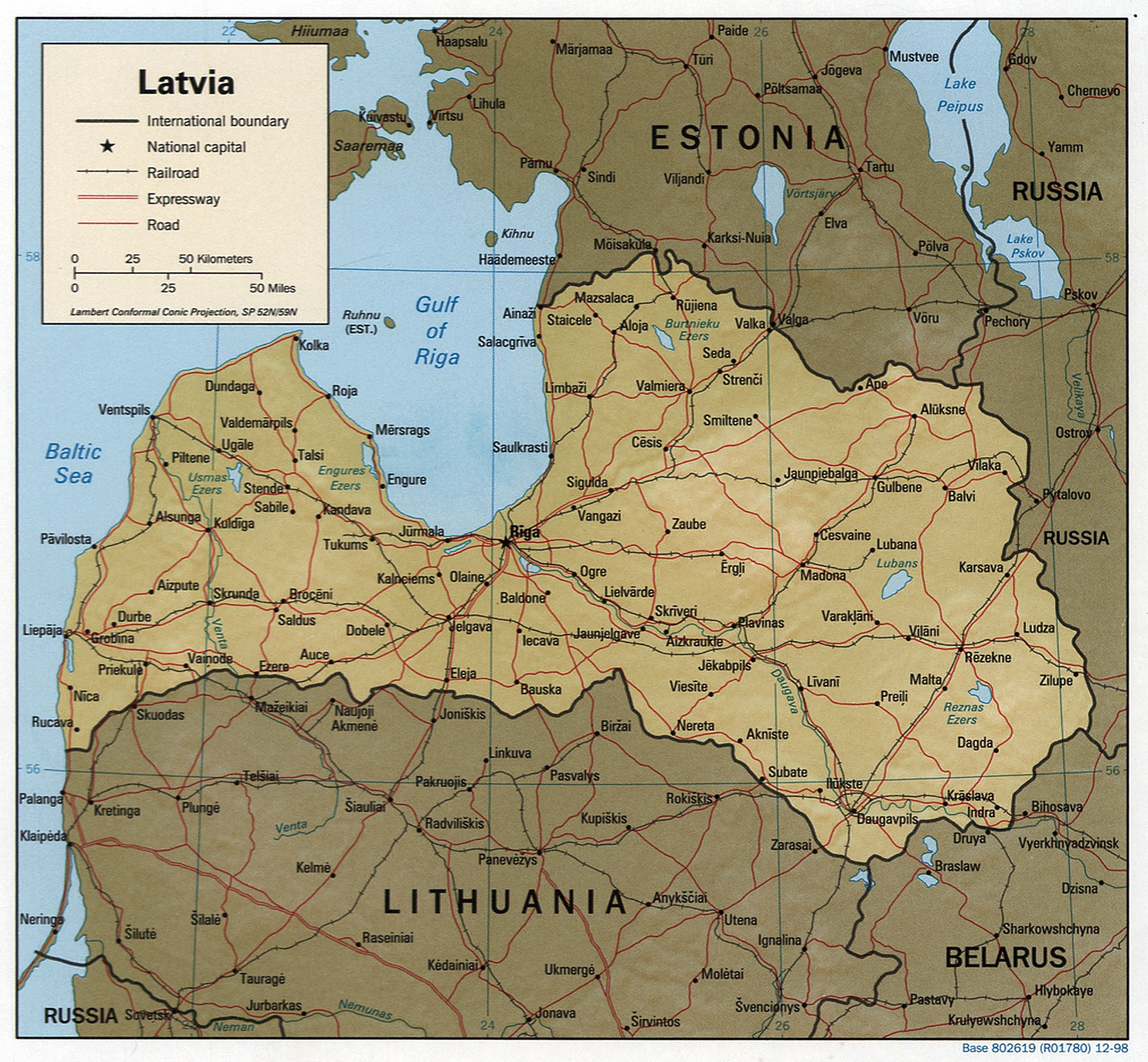
Detailed map of Latvia

Latvia lies on the eastern shores of the Baltic Sea on the level northwestern part of the rising East European platform, between Estonia and Lithuania. About 98% of the country lies under 200 m (656 ft) elevation. With the exception of the coastal plains, the ice age divided Latvia into three main regions: the morainic Western and Eastern uplands and the Middle lowlands. Latvia holds over 12,000 rivers, only 17 of which are longer than 100 km (60 mi), and over 3,000 small lakes, most of which are eutrophic. The major rivers include the Daugava, the Lielupe, the Gauja, the Venta and the Salaca. Woodlands cover around 52% of the country (Pine – 34%, Spruce – 18%, Birch – 30%). Other than peat, dolomite, and limestone, natural resources are scarce. Latvia has 504 km (313 mi) of sandy coastline, and the ports of Liepāja and Ventspils provide important warm-water harbors for the Baltic coast.

Latvia is a small country with a land size of 64,559 km^{2} (24,926 mi^{2}). However, it is larger than many other European countries (Albania, Belgium, Bosnia and Herzegovina, Croatia, Cyprus, Denmark, Estonia, Luxembourg, North Macedonia, Malta, Montenegro, Netherlands, Slovakia, Slovenia or Switzerland). Its strategic location has instigated many wars between rival powers on its territory. As recently as 1944, the USSR granted Russia the Abrene region, which Latvia contested after the dissolution of the Soviet Union.

== Physical environment ==
Latvia encompasses 64,589 square kilometers and is an extension of the East European Plain. Its flat terrain differs little from that of its surrounding neighbors. Latvia's only distinct border is the Baltic Sea coast, which extends for 496 kilometers. Its neighbors include Lithuania on the south (453 kilometers of common border), Estonia on the north (267 kilometers), Russia on the east (217 kilometers), and Belarus on the southeast (141 kilometers). Prior to World War II, Latvia bordered eastern Poland, but as a result of boundary changes by the Soviet Union, this territory was attached to Belarus.

== Geographic features ==
The physiography of Latvia and its neighboring areas was formed, to a large degree, during the Quaternary period and the Pleistocene ice age, when soil and debris were pushed by glaciers into mounds and hills. Undulating plains cover 75% of Latvia's territory and provide the main areas for farming; 25% of the territory lies in uplands of moderate-sized hills. About 27% of the total territory is cultivable, with the central Zemgale Plain south of Riga being the most fertile and profitable. The three main upland areas, in the provinces of Kurzeme (western Latvia), Vidzeme (central Latvia, Vidzeme Upland and Aluksne Upland), and Latgale (eastern Latvia), provide a picturesque pattern of fields interspersed with forests and numerous lakes and rivers. In this area, the extensive glacial moraines, eskers, and drumlins have limited the profitability of agriculture by fragmenting fields and presenting serious erosion problems.

About 10% of Latvian territory consists of peat bogs, swamps, and marshes, some of which are covered by stunted forest growth. Forests are the outstanding feature of Latvia, claiming 42% of the territory. Over the past 100 years the amount of forest territories in Latvia has doubled, and the process is still ongoing. Forest territories are expanding naturally, as well as due to intentional afforestation of barren land and land that cannot be used for agricultural purposes. More than half of the forests consist of Scots pine or Norway spruce.

Nearly all forests in Latvia are publicly accessible, and therefore one of the most widespread pastimes of the population is picking bilberries, cranberries, mushrooms, and other bounties of the natural environment.

Latvia's legislation on forestry is among the strictest in Europe firmly regulating wood harvesting. Each year the forests produce 25 million cubic meters of timber, while only about 12–13 million cubic meters are felled, therefore the amount of mature and old forests continue to increase.

Thanks to the significant amount of forest resources, Latvia has a well-developed wood processing industry, therefore timber and wood products are among the country's most important exports. Latvian wood processing companies are important players in many European markets.

The traditional Latvian approach to forestry with its small system of clear-cut areas combined with the network of forest territories that have seen little human influence, as well as the outflow of people from rural areas to urban ones have facilitated the emergence of a unique biological diversity in forests which home animal and bird species, that have died out or are very rare elsewhere in Europe.

According to a World Wildlife Fund study in 1992, Latvia has sizable populations of black stork, lesser spotted eagle, Eurasian otter, European beaver, Eurasian lynx, and grey wolf. Also in great numbers are red deer and roe deer (total 86,000), wild boar (32,000), elk (25,000) and red fox (13,000).

The variegated and rapidly changing physiography of glacial moraines and lowlands has also allowed temperate flora, such as oaks, to grow within a few hundred meters of northern flora, such as bog cotton and cloudberries. This variety and the rapid change in natural ecosystems are among the unique features of the republic.

The Soviet system left behind another windfall for naturalists. The Latvian western seacoast was a carefully guarded border region. Almost all houses near the sea were razed or evacuated. As a result, about 300 kilometers of undeveloped seashore are graced only by forests of pine and spruce and ecologically unique sand dunes. The temptation for fast profit, however, may foster violation of laws that clearly forbid any construction within one kilometer of the sea. This could lead to one of the last remaining wild shorelines in Europe becoming non-existent.

The seashore adjoining the population centers around Riga was a major focus of tourism during the Soviet era. Jūrmala has many sanitoriums and tourist accommodations, tall pines, sandy beaches, and antique architecture.

Latvia has an abundant network of rivers, contributing to the visual beauty and the economy of the country. The largest river is the Daugava, which has been an important route for several thousand years. It has been used by local tribes as well as by Vikings, Russians, and other Europeans for trade, war, and conquest. With a total length of 1,020 kilometers, the Daugava (or Zapadnaya Dvina in its upper reaches) originates in the Valday Hills in Russia's Tver' Oblast, meanders through northern Belarus, and then winds through Latvia for 352 km (219 mi) before emptying into the Gulf of Riga. It is about 180 meters wide when it enters Latvia, increasing to between 650 and 750 meters at Riga and its opening in Baltic sea.

The river carries an average annual flow of 21 cubic kilometers. Its total descent within Latvia of ninety-eight meters has made it an attractive source of hydroelectric power production. The first hydroelectric station—Ķegums Hydro Power Plant—was built during Latvia's independence period. The second dam—Pļaviņas Hydro Power Plant—aroused an unusual wave of protest in 1958. Most Latvians opposed the flooding of historical sites and a particularly scenic gorge with rare plants and natural features, such as the Staburags, a cliff comparable in cultural significance to the Lorelei in Germany. The construction of the dam was endorsed in 1959, however, after the purge of relatively liberal and nationally oriented leaders under Eduards Berklavs and their replacement by Moscow-oriented, ideologically conservative cadres led by Arvīds Pelše. The third dam—Riga Hydroelectric Power Plant—just above Riga, did not provoke much protest because of the seeming hopelessness of the cause. The proposed fourth dam, at the town of Daugavpils on the Daugava River, became the rallying point for protest in 1986-87 by hundreds of thousands of Latvians. This dam was not constructed, in spite of the vast expenditures already poured into the project.

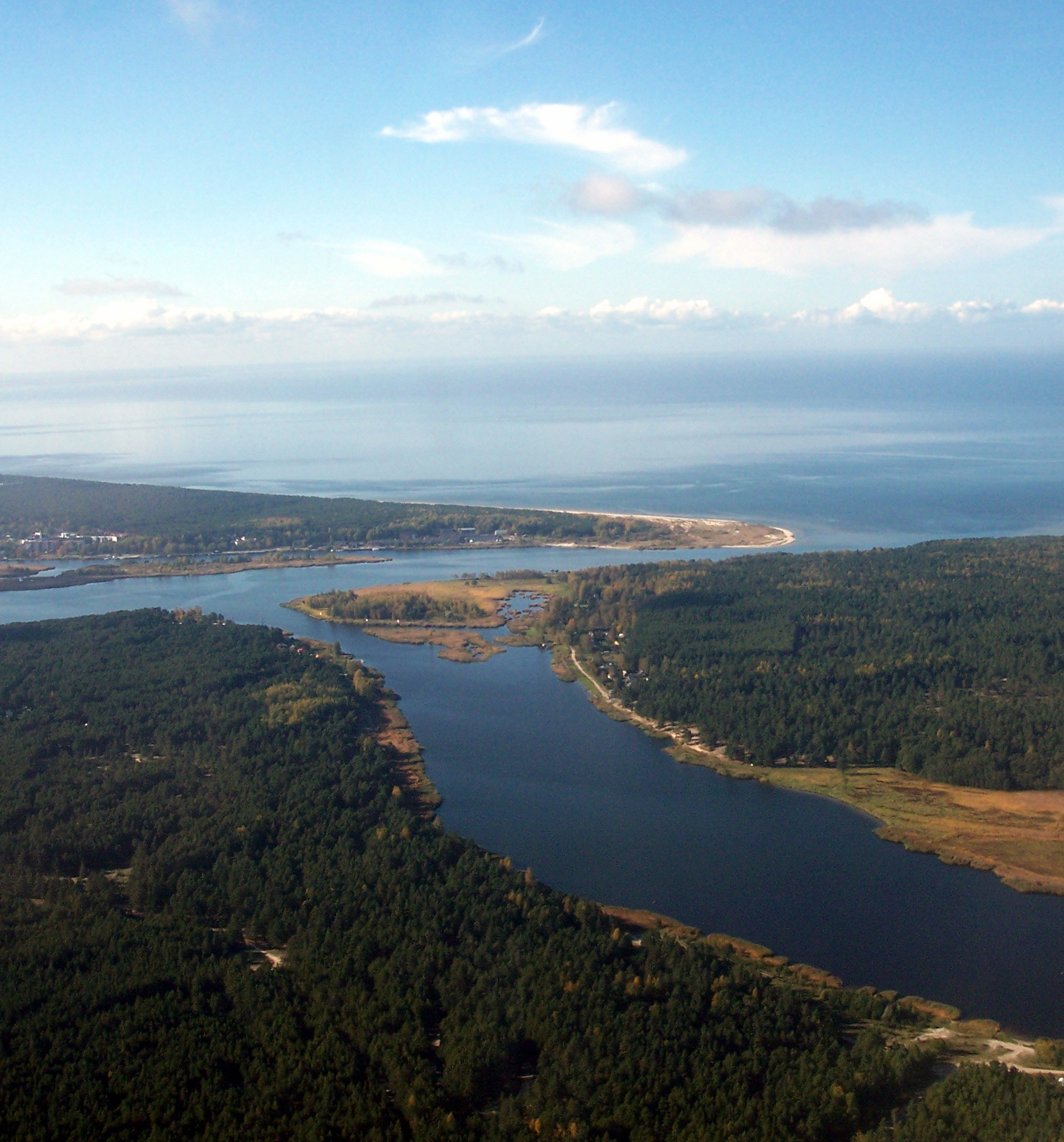
The Lielupe flows into the Baltic Sea in the Gulf of Riga, while the Buļļupe branch flows towards the Daugava River to the west.

Smaller rivers include the Lielupe, in central Latvia, with an average annual flow of 3.6 cubic kilometers; the Venta, in the west, with 2.9 cubic kilometers; the Gauja, in the northeast, with 2.5 cubic kilometers; and the Aiviekste, in the east, with 2.1 cubic kilometers. Very little hydroelectric power is generated by their waters, although planners are now thinking of reactivating some of the abandoned older dams and turbines. The Gauja is one of Latvia's most attractive, relatively clean rivers and has an adjoining large Gauja National Park along both of its banks as one of its notable features. Its cold waters attract trout and salmon, and its sandstone cliff and forest setting are increasingly a magnet for tourists interested in the environment.

More than 60% of the annual water volume of Latvia's six largest rivers comes from neighboring countries, mainly from Belarus and Lithuania. These adjoining resources create obvious needs for cooperation, especially in pollution control. The dangers from a lack of cooperation were brought home to Latvians in November 1990, when a polymer complex in Navapolatsk, Belarus, accidentally spilled 128 tons of cyanide derivatives into the Daugava River with no warning to downstream users in Latvia. Only the presence of numerous dead fish alerted Latvian inhabitants to the danger.

== Climate ==
Köppen–Geiger climate classification map at 1-km resolution for Latvia 1991–2020

In the summer, daylight hours are long and in the winter short. In December it is still pitch dark at 9:00 A.M., and daylight disappears before 4:00 P.M. The climate is tempered by the Gulf Stream flowing across the Atlantic Ocean from Mexico. Average temperatures in winter are reasonably mild, ranging in January from −1.7 °C (28.9 °F) in Liepāja, on the western coast, to −6.6 °C (20.1 °F) in the southeastern town of Daugavpils. July temperatures range from 17.4 °C (63.3 °F) in Liepāja to 17.6 °C (63.7 °F) in Daugavpils. Latvia's proximity to the sea brings high levels of humidity and precipitation, with average annual precipitation of 633 millimeters (24.9 in) in Riga. There, an average of 180 days per year have precipitation, forty-four days have fog, and only seventy-two days are sunny. Continuous snow cover lasts eighty-two days, and the frost-free period lasts 177 days.

This precipitation has helped provide the abundant water for Latvia's many rivers and lakes, but it has created many problems as well. A large part of agricultural land requires drainage. Much money has been spent for land amelioration projects involving the installation of drainage pipes, the straightening and deepening of natural streams, the digging of drainage ditches, and the construction of polder dams. During the 1960s and 1970s, drainage work absorbed about one-third of all agricultural investments in Latvia. Although accounting for only one-third of 1% of the territory, Latvia was responsible for 11% of all artificially drained land in the former Soviet Union.

An additional problem associated with precipitation is the difficulty of early mechanized sowing and harvesting because of waterlogged fields. Heavy precipitation occurs, especially during harvest time in August and September, requiring heavy investment outlays in grain-drying structures and ventilation systems. In 1992 Latvia experienced the driest summer in recorded weather history, but unusually heavy rains in the preceding spring kept crop damage below the extent expected. The moist climate has been a major factor orienting Latvian agriculture toward animal husbandry and dairying. Even most of the field crops, such as barley, oats, and potatoes, are grown for animal feed.

Climate data for Riga (1991−2020 normals, extremes 1885-present)
Month	Jan	Feb	Mar	Apr	May	Jun	Jul	Aug	Sep	Oct	Nov	Dec	Year
Record high °C (°F)	10.2 (50.4)	13.6 (56.5)	20.5 (68.9)	27.9 (82.2)	30.5 (86.9)	34.0 (93.2)	34.5 (94.1)	33.9 (93.0)	29.4 (84.9)	23.4 (74.1)	17.2 (63.0)	11.8 (53.2)	34.5 (94.1)
Mean daily maximum °C (°F)	−0.1 (31.8)	0.3 (32.5)	4.8 (40.6)	11.9 (53.4)	17.8 (64.0)	21.3 (70.3)	23.8 (74.8)	22.7 (72.9)	17.3 (63.1)	10.5 (50.9)	4.8 (40.6)	1.4 (34.5)	11.4 (52.5)
Daily mean °C (°F)	−2.1 (28.2)	−2.0 (28.4)	1.5 (34.7)	7.4 (45.3)	13.0 (55.4)	16.7 (62.1)	19.3 (66.7)	18.3 (64.9)	13.4 (56.1)	7.5 (45.5)	3.0 (37.4)	−0.3 (31.5)	8.0 (46.4)
Mean daily minimum °C (°F)	−4.5 (23.9)	−4.6 (23.7)	−1.7 (28.9)	2.9 (37.2)	8.2 (46.8)	12.4 (54.3)	14.9 (58.8)	14.1 (57.4)	9.8 (49.6)	4.9 (40.8)	1.1 (34.0)	−2.4 (27.7)	4.6 (40.3)
Record low °C (°F)	−33.7 (−28.7)	−34.9 (−30.8)	−30.3 (−22.5)	−13.1 (8.4)	−5.5 (22.1)	−2.3 (27.9)	4.0 (39.2)	0.0 (32.0)	−4.1 (24.6)	−9.5 (14.9)	−20.5 (−4.9)	−31.9 (−25.4)	−34.9 (−30.8)
Average precipitation mm (inches)	46.5 (1.83)	40.1 (1.58)	34.1 (1.34)	35.0 (1.38)	47.5 (1.87)	65.0 (2.56)	79.5 (3.13)	77.9 (3.07)	67.1 (2.64)	75.6 (2.98)	56.3 (2.22)	50.2 (1.98)	674.8 (26.58)
Average snowfall cm (inches)	25.0 (9.8)	23.6 (9.3)	15.7 (6.2)	5.2 (2.0)	0.0 (0.0)	0.0 (0.0)	0.0 (0.0)	0.0 (0.0)	0.0 (0.0)	1.2 (0.5)	7.0 (2.8)	22.0 (8.7)	99.7 (39.3)
Average precipitation days (≥ 1.0mm)	9.4	7.0	8.2	8.0	7.7	8.9	11.2	10.9	12.3	11.6	12.5	12.2	119.9
Average relative humidity (%)	87.9	85.2	79.4	69.7	67.7	72.0	74.2	76.7	81.1	85.1	90.2	89.4	79.9
Mean monthly sunshine hours	36.6	64.2	141.2	203.6	286.7	282.2	291.2	250.4	166.7	95.5	36.1	24.4	1,878.8
Average ultraviolet index	0	1	2	3	5	6	5	5	3	1	0	0	3
Source 1: Latvian Environment, Geology and Meteorology Agency (temperature, precipitation and sunshine)
Source 2: NOAA (precipitation days 1961-1990), Weather Atlas, and World Weather Online (snowfall)

Climate data for Ventspils (1991−2020 normals, extremes 1873−present)
Month	Jan	Feb	Mar	Apr	May	Jun	Jul	Aug	Sep	Oct	Nov	Dec	Year
Record high °C (°F)	8.9 (48.0)	14.2 (57.6)	18.6 (65.5)	26.1 (79.0)	31.7 (89.1)	33.1 (91.6)	34.8 (94.6)	37.8 (100.0)	30.2 (86.4)	22.6 (72.7)	15.1 (59.2)	12.5 (54.5)	37.8 (100.0)
Mean daily maximum °C (°F)	1.2 (34.2)	1.0 (33.8)	3.7 (38.7)	8.9 (48.0)	13.9 (57.0)	17.7 (63.9)	20.9 (69.6)	21.1 (70.0)	16.8 (62.2)	11.1 (52.0)	6.1 (43.0)	3.1 (37.6)	10.5 (50.8)
Daily mean °C (°F)	−0.5 (31.1)	−1.1 (30.0)	1.3 (34.3)	5.6 (42.1)	10.4 (50.7)	14.5 (58.1)	17.8 (64.0)	17.8 (64.0)	13.8 (56.8)	8.6 (47.5)	4.2 (39.6)	1.3 (34.3)	7.8 (46.0)
Mean daily minimum °C (°F)	−2.6 (27.3)	−3.3 (26.1)	−1.1 (30.0)	2.8 (37.0)	7.3 (45.1)	11.5 (52.7)	14.7 (58.5)	14.5 (58.1)	10.8 (51.4)	6.0 (42.8)	2.2 (36.0)	−0.7 (30.7)	5.2 (41.3)
Record low °C (°F)	−31.6 (−24.9)	−29.5 (−21.1)	−26.7 (−16.1)	−12.7 (9.1)	−4.3 (24.3)	0.5 (32.9)	4.2 (39.6)	2.6 (36.7)	−2.9 (26.8)	−8.5 (16.7)	−15.0 (5.0)	−25.0 (−13.0)	−31.6 (−24.9)
Average precipitation mm (inches)	59.3 (2.33)	46.3 (1.82)	38.9 (1.53)	31.6 (1.24)	36.8 (1.45)	49.6 (1.95)	63.5 (2.50)	75.9 (2.99)	64.4 (2.54)	84.8 (3.34)	70.6 (2.78)	71.2 (2.80)	692.9 (27.27)
Average precipitation days (≥ 1 mm)	13	9	10	7	7	8	8	10	10	14	14	14	124
Mean monthly sunshine hours	21.2	50.4	128.1	174.4	322.2	268.8	270.4	149.2	127.6	103.3	24.4	25.1	1,665.1
Source 1: LVĢMC
Source 2: NOAA (precipitation days 1981-2010), infoclimat.fr (sunshine 1991-2020)

Climate data for Liepaja (1991–2020 temp and precipitation, 1961–1990 sun and humidity, extremes 1895-present)
Month	Jan	Feb	Mar	Apr	May	Jun	Jul	Aug	Sep	Oct	Nov	Dec	Year
Record high °C (°F)	14.3 (57.7)	15.5 (59.9)	19.0 (66.2)	27.0 (80.6)	32.3 (90.1)	36.5 (97.7)	36.9 (98.4)	36.1 (97.0)	30.7 (87.3)	24.9 (76.8)	16.5 (61.7)	13.7 (56.7)	36.9 (98.4)
Mean maximum °C (°F)	5.7 (42.3)	5.9 (42.6)	10.8 (51.4)	20.5 (68.9)	25.7 (78.3)	26.9 (80.4)	29.1 (84.4)	28.2 (82.8)	23.2 (73.8)	17.2 (63.0)	10.9 (51.6)	7.2 (45.0)	30.4 (86.7)
Mean daily maximum °C (°F)	0.9 (33.6)	1.1 (34.0)	4.2 (39.6)	10.4 (50.7)	15.4 (59.7)	18.6 (65.5)	21.6 (70.9)	21.6 (70.9)	17.1 (62.8)	11.2 (52.2)	5.9 (42.6)	2.6 (36.7)	11.0 (51.8)
Daily mean °C (°F)	−1.0 (30.2)	−1.2 (29.8)	1.3 (34.3)	6.5 (43.7)	11.2 (52.2)	14.8 (58.6)	17.9 (64.2)	17.7 (63.9)	13.8 (56.8)	8.5 (47.3)	4.1 (39.4)	0.9 (33.6)	8.0 (46.4)
Mean daily minimum °C (°F)	−3.0 (26.6)	−3.4 (25.9)	−1.6 (29.1)	2.5 (36.5)	7.0 (44.6)	11.0 (51.8)	14.1 (57.4)	13.8 (56.8)	10.3 (50.5)	5.8 (42.4)	2.2 (36.0)	−0.8 (30.6)	4.9 (40.8)
Mean minimum °C (°F)	−14.8 (5.4)	−13.2 (8.2)	−9.2 (15.4)	−3.6 (25.5)	0.2 (32.4)	4.5 (40.1)	8.3 (46.9)	7.8 (46.0)	3.3 (37.9)	−2.2 (28.0)	−5.2 (22.6)	−10.2 (13.6)	−18.0 (−0.4)
Record low °C (°F)	−32.9 (−27.2)	−31.6 (−24.9)	−23.8 (−10.8)	−10.1 (13.8)	−4.3 (24.3)	0.5 (32.9)	4.0 (39.2)	3.0 (37.4)	−1.7 (28.9)	−7.3 (18.9)	−17.5 (0.5)	−25.8 (−14.4)	−32.9 (−27.2)
Average precipitation mm (inches)	61.0 (2.40)	43.3 (1.70)	42.3 (1.67)	42.9 (1.69)	38.8 (1.53)	51.5 (2.03)	70.9 (2.79)	83.4 (3.28)	77.5 (3.05)	89.0 (3.50)	83.5 (3.29)	79.7 (3.14)	755.6 (29.75)
Average precipitation days	13.51	9.80	10.04	7.05	7.15	8.24	8.51	9.95	11.11	13.68	15.04	15.15	127.69
Average relative humidity (%)	87.2	85.8	82.8	76.3	75.7	77.4	78.9	78.5	80.5	82.9	87.4	86.9	81.7
Mean monthly sunshine hours	34	64	130	187	273	295	279	248	173	103	43	28	1,857
Source 1: NOAA (sun 1961–1990)
Source 2: Weatherbase (humidity) Source #3: Météo Climat

Climate data for Daugavpils (1991−2020 normals, extremes 1891-present)
Month	Jan	Feb	Mar	Apr	May	Jun	Jul	Aug	Sep	Oct	Nov	Dec	Year
Record high °C (°F)	11.1 (52.0)	13.1 (55.6)	18.4 (65.1)	27.4 (81.3)	31.8 (89.2)	33.1 (91.6)	35.1 (95.2)	33.5 (92.3)	31.3 (88.3)	23.6 (74.5)	16.3 (61.3)	10.6 (51.1)	35.1 (95.2)
Mean daily maximum °C (°F)	−1.8 (28.8)	−1.1 (30.0)	4.0 (39.2)	12.2 (54.0)	18.1 (64.6)	21.4 (70.5)	23.7 (74.7)	22.5 (72.5)	17.0 (62.6)	9.9 (49.8)	3.6 (38.5)	−0.2 (31.6)	10.8 (51.4)
Daily mean °C (°F)	−4.1 (24.6)	−4.1 (24.6)	0.0 (32.0)	6.7 (44.1)	12.2 (54.0)	15.8 (60.4)	18.1 (64.6)	16.8 (62.2)	11.9 (53.4)	6.3 (43.3)	1.5 (34.7)	−2.2 (28.0)	6.6 (43.8)
Mean daily minimum °C (°F)	−7.0 (19.4)	−7.7 (18.1)	−4.3 (24.3)	1.1 (34.0)	5.7 (42.3)	9.7 (49.5)	12.1 (53.8)	11.0 (51.8)	7.0 (44.6)	2.7 (36.9)	−0.8 (30.6)	−4.5 (23.9)	2.1 (35.8)
Record low °C (°F)	−42.7 (−44.9)	−43.2 (−45.8)	−32.0 (−25.6)	−18.6 (−1.5)	−5.5 (22.1)	−1.3 (29.7)	2.1 (35.8)	−1.5 (29.3)	−5.0 (23.0)	−14.7 (5.5)	−24.1 (−11.4)	−38.7 (−37.7)	−43.2 (−45.8)
Average precipitation mm (inches)	40.3 (1.59)	38.7 (1.52)	35.5 (1.40)	34.6 (1.36)	61.6 (2.43)	74.2 (2.92)	72.9 (2.87)	71.7 (2.82)	56.1 (2.21)	58.6 (2.31)	48.4 (1.91)	42.8 (1.69)	635.4 (25.03)
Average precipitation days (≥ 1.0 mm)	9.6	7.7	8.5	8.0	9.2	9.9	11.1	10.2	11.7	9.8	11.4	11.9	119.0
Mean monthly sunshine hours	35.1	62.2	133.4	195.1	270.2	271.9	277.2	244.5	156.4	87.9	30.5	24.9	1,789.3
Source 1: LVĢMC
Source 2: NOAA (precipitation days 1961-1990)

== Natural resources ==
Latvia cannot claim valuable natural resources. Nevertheless, the abundant presence of such materials as limestone for cement (6 billion cubic meters or 8 billion cubic yards), gypsum (165 million cubic meters or 216 million cubic yards), high-quality clay (375 million cubic meters or 490 million cubic yards), dolomite (615 million cubic meters or 804 million cubic yards), peat (480,000,000 metric tons (470,000,000 long tons; 530,000,000 short tons)), and construction materials, including gravel and sand, satisfy local needs. Fish from the Baltic Sea is another potential export resource. Amber, million-year-old chunks of petrified pine pitch, is often found on the beaches of the Baltic Sea and is in high demand for jewelry. It has also had a symbolic impact on the country, which is often called Dzintarzeme, or Amberland. The future may hold potentially more valuable resources if oil fields are discovered in Latvian territorial waters, as some geologists have predicted. Latvia has an Exclusive Economic Zone of 28,452 km^{2} (10,985 mi^{2}).

== Area and boundaries ==
Area:
total: 64,589 km^{2} (24,938 sq mi)
land: 62,249 km^{2} (24,034 sq mi)
water: 2,340 km^{2} (900 sq mi)

Land boundaries:
total: 1,382 km (859 mi)
border countries: Belarus 171 km (106 mi), Estonia 343 km (213 mi), Lithuania 576 km (358 mi), Russia 292 km (181 mi)

Coastline: 498 km (309 mi)

Maritime claims:
territorial sea: 12 nmi (22.2 km; 13.8 mi)
exclusive economic zone: 28,452 km^{2} (10,985 mi^{2}) with 200 nmi (370.4 km; 230.2 mi)
continental shelf: 200 m (660 ft) depth or to the depth of exploitation

Extreme points:

- North : (58.085137°N 25.199203°E)
- South : (55.674971°N 26.597213°E)
- West : (56.353933°N 20.970153°E)
- East : (56.276911°N 28.241043°E)

Elevation extremes:
lowest point: Baltic Sea 0 m
highest point: Gaizinkalns 312 m (1,024 ft)

== Resources and land use ==
Natural resources: peat, limestone, dolomite, amber, hydropower, timber, arable land

Land use:
arable land: 17.96%
permanent crops: 0.11%
other: 81.93% (2011)

Irrigated land: 8.3 km^{2} (3.2 sq mi)
note: land in Latvia is often too wet and in need of drainage not irrigation; approximately 16,000 km^{2} (6,200 sq mi) or 85% of agricultural land has been improved by drainage (2007)

Total renewable water resources:
35.45 km^{3} (2011)

== Environmental concerns ==
Natural hazards: none

Environment - current issues: Latvia's environment has benefited from a shift to service industries after the country regained independence; the main environmental priorities are improvement of drinking water quality and sewage system, household, and hazardous waste management, as well as reduction of air pollution; in 2001, Latvia closed the EU accession negotiation chapter on environment committing to full enforcement of EU environmental directives by 2010

Environment - international agreements:
party to: Air Pollution, Air Pollution-Persistent Organic Pollutants, Biodiversity, Climate Change-Kyoto Protocol, Endangered Species, Hazardous Wastes, Law of the Sea, Ozone Layer Protection, Ship Pollution, Wetlands
signed, but not ratified: none of the selected agreements

== See also ==
- Cultural regions of Latvia
- Dobele crater
