= Ošupe Parish =

Parish in Madona Municipality, Latvia

- parish of Latvia
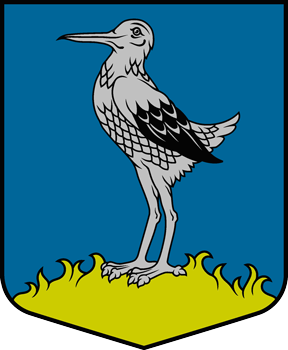
- Coat of arms

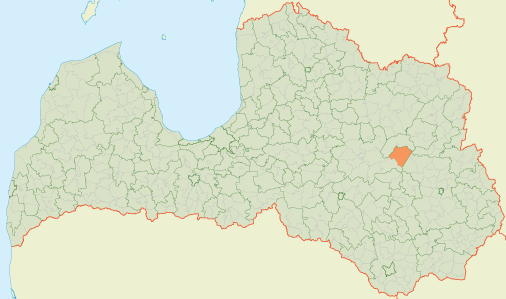
- 56°48′57″N 26°46′15″E

- Location within Latvia
- Country: Latvia

Area
  - Total: 229.92 km^{2} (88.77 sq mi)
  - Land: 190.91 km^{2} (73.71 sq mi)
  - Water: 39.01 km^{2} (15.06 sq mi)

Population (1 January 2026)
  - Total: 758
  - Density: 3.97/km^{2} (10.3/sq mi)

Ošupe Parish (Latvian: Ošupes pagasts) is an administrative unit of Madona Municipality, Latvia. The administrative center is the village of Degumnieki.

== Villages and settlements of Ošupe parish ==
- Degumnieki
- Ošupe
- Zvidziena
- Kalnagals
- Druvenieki
- Iecelnieki
- Stūramežs
