= Alūksne Upland =

Upland in Latvia

Coordinates: 57.5000°N 27.0000°E

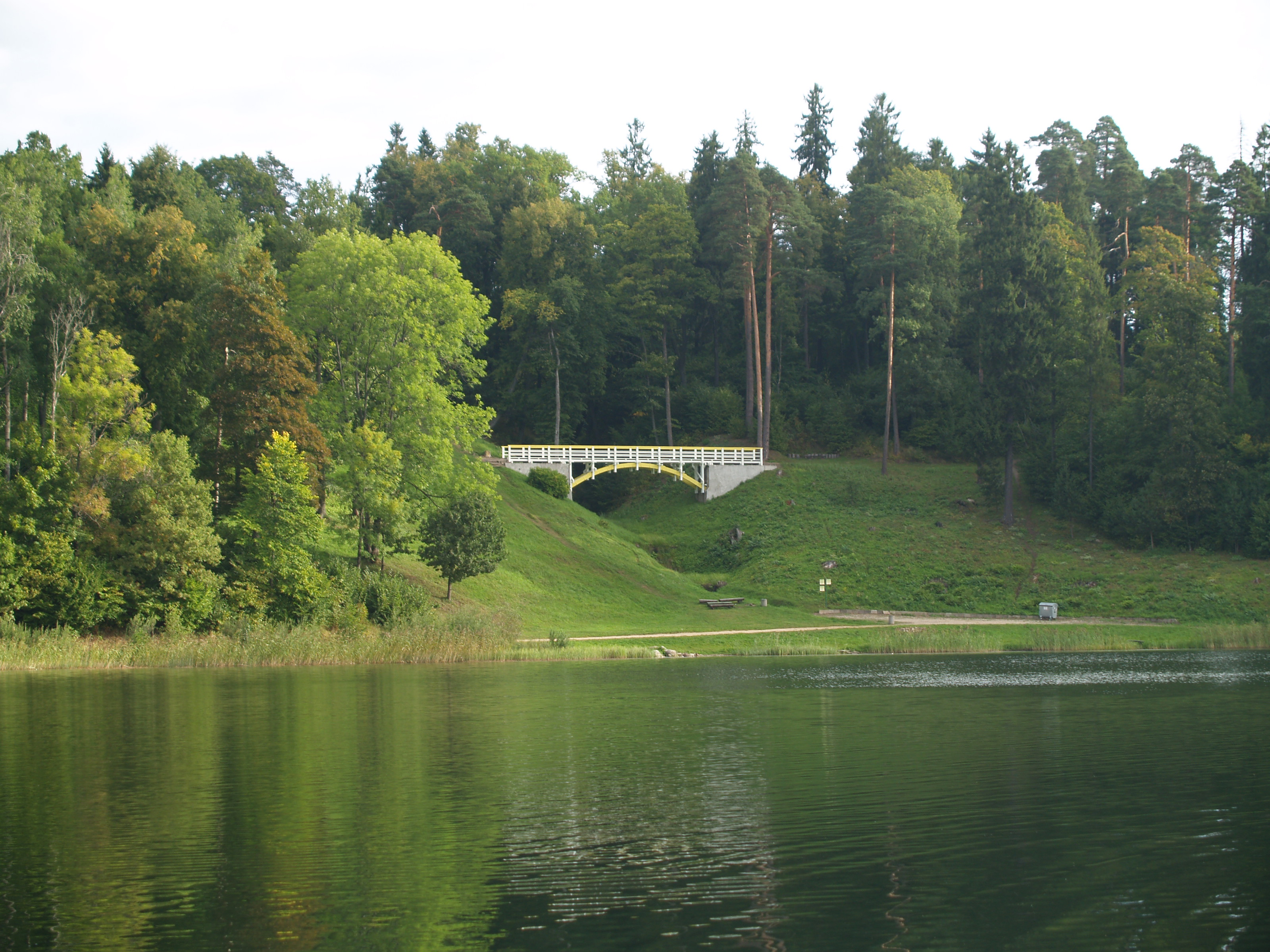
Bridge of the Sun (Päikese Sild) at Alūksne

Alūksne Upland (Alūksne Highland; Latvian: Alūksnes augstiene) is a hilly area of higher elevation in eastern Latvia, in the historical region of Vidzeme. Sometimes it is referred to as the East Vidzeme Upland, to distinguish it from another hilly area of Vidzeme, Vidzeme Upland, also known as the "Central Vidzeme Upland".

== Geography ==
The upland continues into the neighbouring Estonia as the Haanja Upland. The Alūksne Upland is part of the drainage divide between Gauja and Daugava river basins.

== Geology and geomorphology ==
The Alūksne Upland forms an "isometric insular" glacial upland that originated as a bedrock-cored plateau when converging ice lobes stalled and deposited till. Its summit plateau ranges from 190 to 230 m a.s.l., rising 20–40 m above adjacent lowlands, and is mantled by 6–8 m (locally up to 28.5 m) of glaciolacustrine clays and silts laid down in ice-dammed lakes during the final stages of the Weichselian deglaciation.

== Climate ==
The Alūksne Upland has a humid continental climate characterised by cool summers and cold winters. According to long-term records from the nearby Alūksne meteorological station (1922–2003), mean annual precipitation is about 728 mm, with roughly 242 mm falling from June to August and 143 mm from December to February. Over 1950–2003, annual precipitation at Alūksne showed a modest but statistically significant upward trend.

Regional temperature data from Rīga–University (1795–2002) show that mean winter temperatures have risen by approximately 1.9 °C and mean annual temperatures by 1.0 °C, with spring means up by 1.3 °C. Winters have thus become shorter and milder, contributing to a reduction in ice cover duration on upland streams by several days per decade and to higher winter discharge, especially during positive phases of the North Atlantic oscillation.
