= Teiči Nature Reserve =

Nature Reserve in Latvia

- IUCN category Ib (wilderness area)
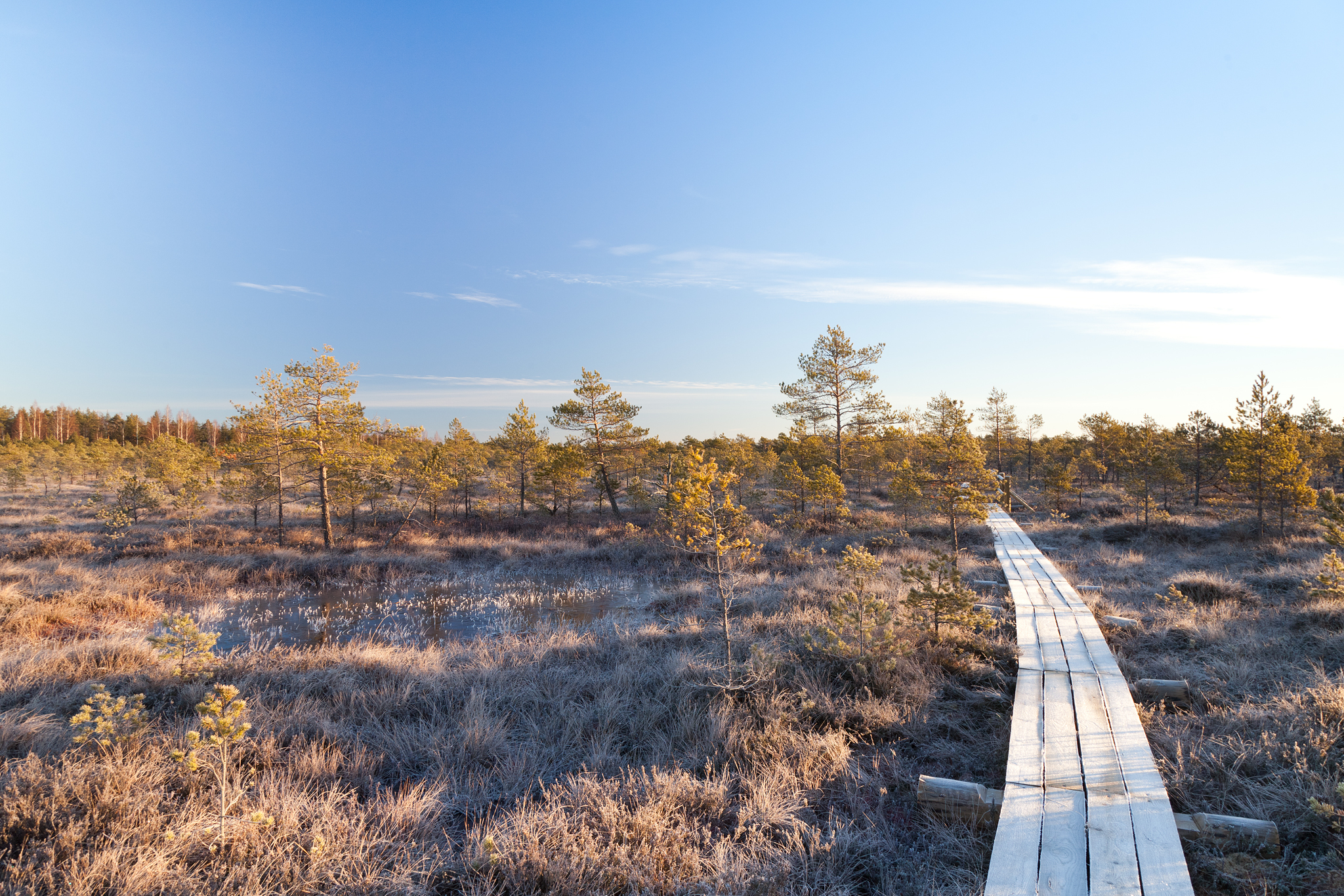

- Location within Latvia
- Location: Latvia
- Coordinates: 56°36′09″N 26°29′55″E
- Area: 19,772 ha (48,860 acres)
- Established: 1982

Ramsar Wetland
- Official name: Teiči and Pelecare bogs
- Designated: 25 July 1995
- Reference no.: 740

Teiči Nature Reserve (Latvian: Teiču dabas rezervāts) is a nature reserve situated in eastern Latvia, spread across Madona, Varakļāni and Jēkabpils municipalities.

== History ==
The nature reserve was created in 1982. Its purpose is to protect the eponymous bog, one of the largest in Latvia and the Baltic states. The nature reserve covers an area of 19,779 ha (48,870 acres), of which 13,681 ha (33,810 acres) is composed of Teiči bog. In this wet area, veritable little lakes have formed in places and there are in total 18 such lakes within the area, but in other places raised patches of firmer ground form little islands in the bog.

Forest occupies around 3,729 ha (9,210 acres) of the nature reserve. Teiči Nature Reserve forms one of the largest ecosystems of its kind in the Baltic area, and the bog itself is one of the largest in the Baltic states; according to information from Madona Municipality, the largest one.

== Geography ==
The area enjoys an unusually high degree of protection, being a "strict nature reserve" as defined by Latvian authorities. It is one of only four such nature reserves in Latvia (from a total of 683 specially protected nature areas). This is a designation reserved for areas with little or no human activity and rare or typical ecosystems. The bogs have been designated as a protected Ramsar site since 1995. Since 2004, it is part of the EU-wide Natura 2000-network.

Being a strict nature reserve, access to the area is regulated. It is divided into two parts, a regulated access area and a restricted access area. The access to the restricted access area is normally forbidden; only visits for scientific purposes may be conducted and requires a permit from the relevant authority. Access to the regulated access area is possible during a limited time of the year (1 June to 31 October), provided visitors are accompanied by a guide with the proper credentials. There is also an observation tower accessible without a guide located in the part of the nature reserve located in Krustpils Municipality.

== Flora and fauna ==
The reserve is home to a number of rare or threatened species, including 38 protected species of flowering plants and ferns and 24 protected species of moss. It is an important habitat also for animals, including invertebrates. It is an internationally important locale for both migratory and sedentary birds. Specimen of most of the birds known to inhabit Latvian wetlands can be found here, some in large numbers — for example cranes and geese.

On one of the islands in the nature reserve, Siksala, a small group of Old Believers live. Ethnic Russians, they arrived on Siksala island in the 17th century, escaping religious persecution, and still maintain their village.
