= Kaučers Protected Landscape =

Protected landscape area

- IUCN category V (protected landscape/seascape)
- Location within Latvia
- Location: Preiļi Municipality, Latgale, Latvia,
- Nearest city: Preiļi
- Coordinates: 56°16′17″N 26°51′30″E
- Area: 27.69 km^{2} (10.69 sq mi)
- Established: 2004

Kaučers Protected Landscape is located in Rušona Parish, Preiļi Municipality in the Latgale region of Latvia. The area is named after Lake Kaučers, which is located in the center of the protected area. There are six other lakes in the protected area: Lake Baiba, Esereits, Limins, Meirauka, Salmejs and Lake Stupon. The state highway V742 (Preiļi – Gaiļmuiža – Feimaņi) passes through the northern part of the territory. Next to it is Gaiļmuiža. This is an Natura 2000 site.

== Flora ==
There are a large number of protected plant species in the area: slender naiad (Najas flexilis), three-ranked spear-moss (Pseudocalliergon trifarium), wideleaf tortula moss (Tortula latifolia), yellow foxglove (Digitalis grandiflora).

== Fauna ==
Protected fauna species in the area include beetle ( Graphoderus bilineatus), large copper butterfly (Lycaena dispar), Geyer's whorl snail (Vertigo geyeri), Northern crested newt (Triturus cristatus), sand lizard (Lacerta agilis), corncrake (Crex crex), black woodpecker (Dryocopus martius), grey-headed woodpecker (Picus canus).
