= Haanja Upland =

Upland in Estonia

Coordinates: 57°50′06″N 27°00′54″E

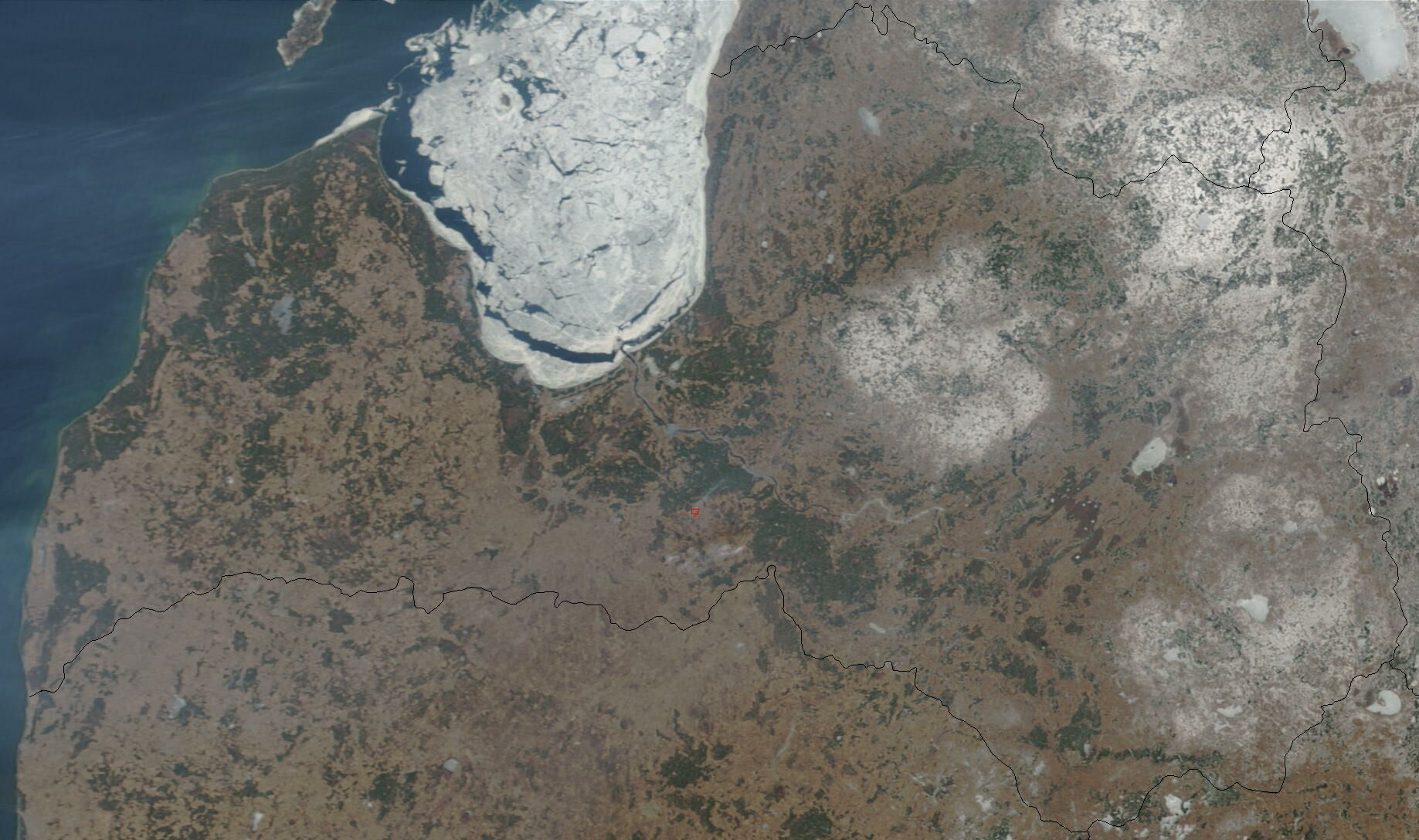
A satellite image of Latvia and part of Estonia

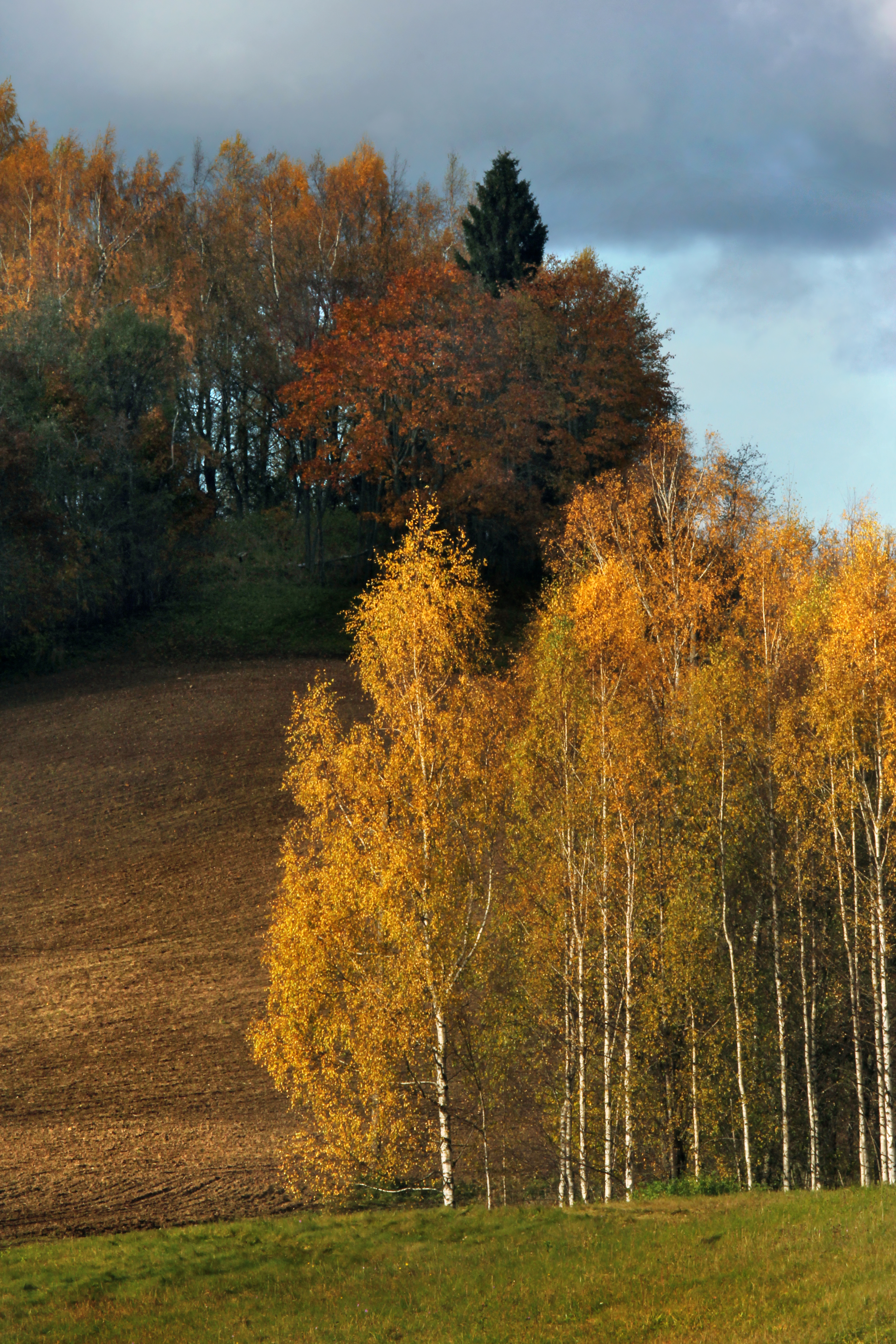
Haanja Upland

Haanja Upland (also Haanja Highland, Estonian: Haanja kõrgustik) is a hilly area of higher elevation in southern Estonia. It contains the highest point of Estonia, Suur Munamägi.

The upland continues into the neighboring Latvia as the Alūksne Upland.
