= Bērzaune Parish =

Parish of Latvia

- parish of Latvia
- Coat of arms

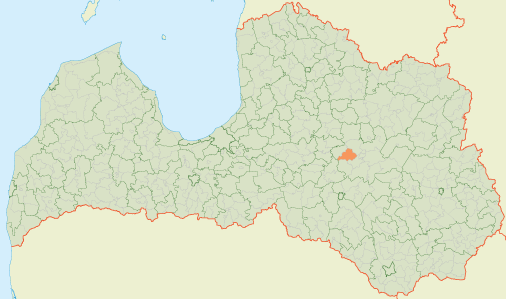
- 56°49′47″N 25°59′15″E
- Country: Latvia

Area
  - Total: 115.91 km^{2} (44.75 sq mi)
  - Land: 113.72 km^{2} (43.91 sq mi)
  - Water: 2.19 km^{2} (0.85 sq mi)

Population (1 January 2024)
  - Total: 1,293
  - Density: 11/km^{2} (29/sq mi)
- Website: www.berzaune.lv

Bērzaune parish (Latvian: Bērzaunes pagasts) is an administrative unit of Madona Municipality, Latvia. Close to the highest point in Latvia Gaiziņkalns, only 13 km (8.1 mi) away.

== Towns, villages and settlements of Bērzaune parish ==
- Bērzaune
- Dzirnaviņas
- Muižnieki
- Ozolkrogs
- Sauleskalns
