= Arona Parish =

Parish of Latvia

- parish of Latvia
- Coat of arms

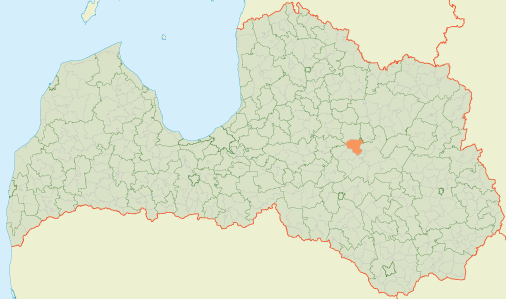
- 56°54′19″N 26°05′48″E
- Country: Latvia

Area
  - Total: 149.91 km^{2} (57.88 sq mi)
  - Land: 146.19 km^{2} (56.44 sq mi)
  - Water: 3.72 km^{2} (1.44 sq mi)

Population (1 January 2024)
  - Total: 1,190
  - Density: 7.9/km^{2} (21/sq mi)
- Website: www.aronaspagasts.lv

Arona Parish (Latvian: Aronas pagasts) is an administrative unit of Madona Municipality in the Vidzeme region of Latvia.
