= Gaiziņkalns =

Highest hill of Latvia

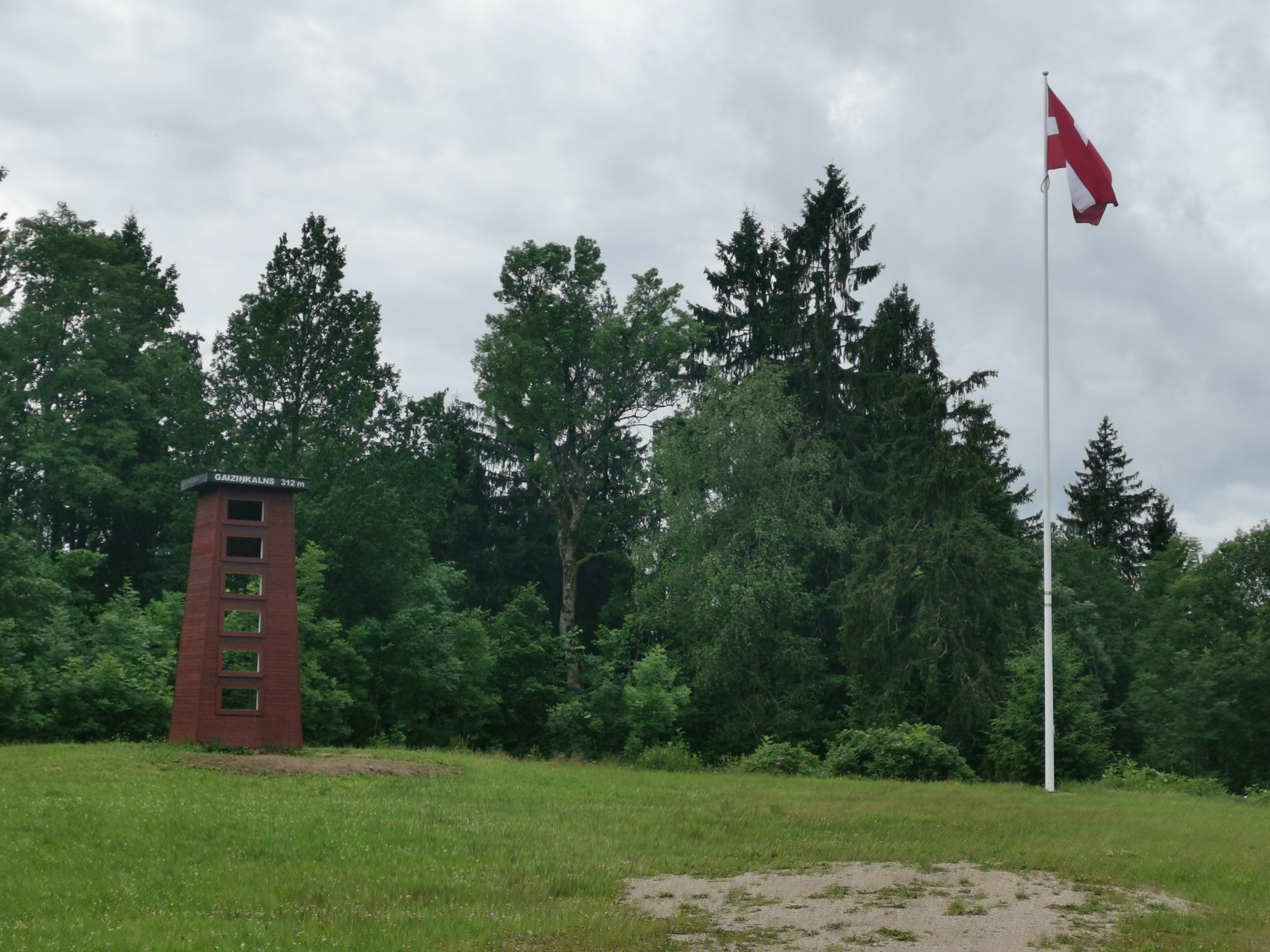
- A flagpole with a replica of the demolished tower.

Highest point
- Elevation: 312 m (1,024 ft)
- Isolation: 114.91 km (71.40 mi) to Suur Munamägi
- Listing: Country high point
- Coordinates: 56°52′12.93″N 25°57′33.68″E

Geography
- Location within Latvia
- Location: Bērzaune parish, Madona Municipality, Latvia

Gaiziņkalns (German: Mesenberg), at 312 m (1,024 feet) above sea level, is the highest point in Latvia. It is situated in the Vidzeme Upland, a short distance to the west of the town of Madona, central Vidzeme.

Although only relatively high, Gaiziņkalns has been developed into a skiing area with three slopes and several guesthouses. In order to rival Suur Munamägi - the highest point of neighbouring Estonia at 318 metres - a tower was built which exceeds the latter in height. Although the construction work was not finished, the tower became a popular tourist attraction, which led to its closure due to the serious risk to safety. The tower was demolished in December 2012, and the rubble was removed. There is a nearby multilingual sign marking the high point, but nothing at the natural summit itself.

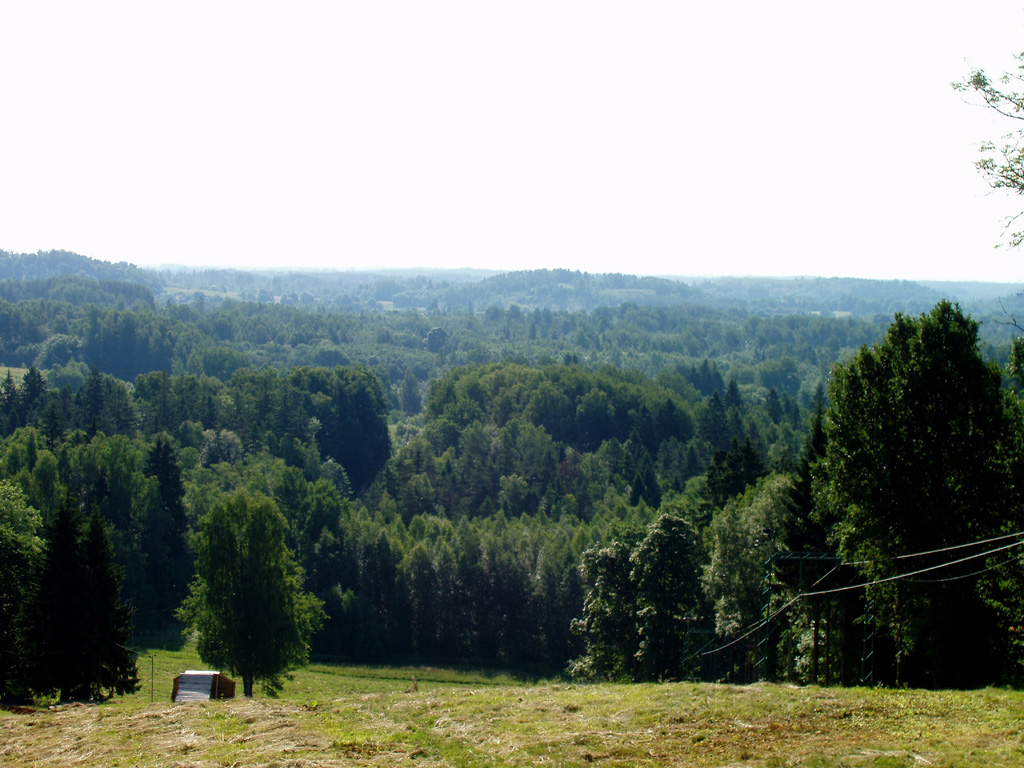
View from Gaiziņkalns

== See also ==
- Extreme points of Latvia
- List of highest points of European countries
