= Vidzeme Upland =

Mountain range and upland in Latvia

Coordinates: 56°52′12.93″N 25°57′33.68″E

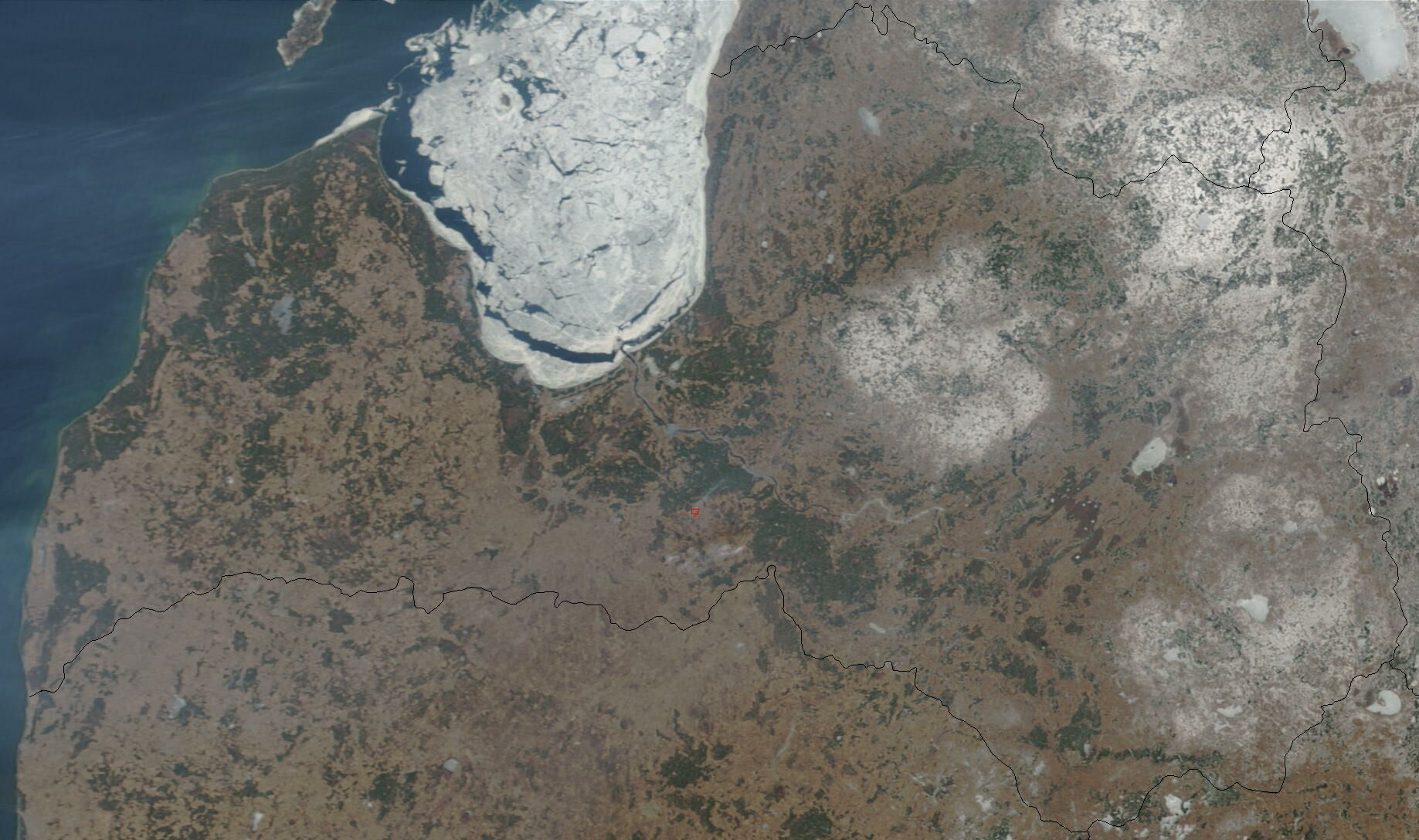
A satellite image of Latvia

The Vidzeme Upland or the Vidzeme Highland (Latvian: Vidzemes augstiene) is a hilly area of higher elevation in northeastern Latvia, named after the historical region of Vidzeme. Sometimes it is referred to as the Central Vidzeme Upland, to distinguish it from another hilly area of Vidzeme, Alūksne Upland, also known as the "East Vidzeme Upland".

== Geography ==
The Vidzeme Upland is part of the drainage divide between Gauja and Daugava river basins.

The upland contains the highest point of Latvia, the Gaiziņkalns hill.

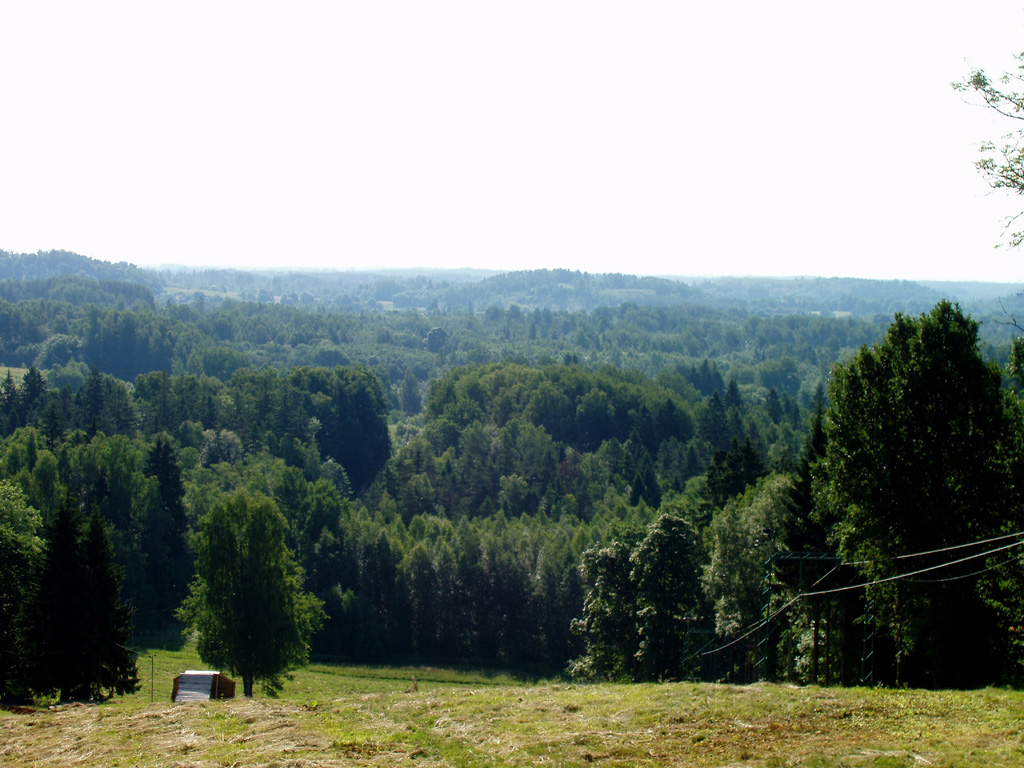
Gaizinkalns southeast slope

The plateau is based on a high elevation of bedrock, which is covered by the thickest Quaternary sediment cover in Latvia - on average 80 m, but in some places even up to 120–170 m thick. Therefore, the bedrock is exposed only in some places at the foot of the plateau. The average height of Vidzeme highlands is 250 m. There are several high peaks in the plateau:

- Gaizinkalns (311.5 m) - the highest peak in Latvia and the second highest Baltic States,
- Sirdskalns (296.8 m),
- Nesaules kalns (284 m),
- Klētskalns (269 m),
- Bākūžu kalns (272 m),
- Elkas kalns(261 m),
- Brežģa kalns (255 m).

Aumeisteru mound is a meridionally extended elevation of bedrock with a complex relief formed by two ridge-shaped ridges with a series of boggy depressions between them.

In the lower reaches of the Upper Gauja and Augšogres, the surface of the bedrock is flat, covered by a 70–100 m thick sedimentary cover. The relief is formed by small hills (chemists), between which there are swampy depressions.

In the territory of Vidzeme Highlands there are such cities and settlements as Madona, Cesvaine, Ērgļi, Smiltene and Līgatne. They are all located on the slopes of the Vidzeme highlands.
