= Vestiena Parish =

Parish of Latvia

- parish of Latvia
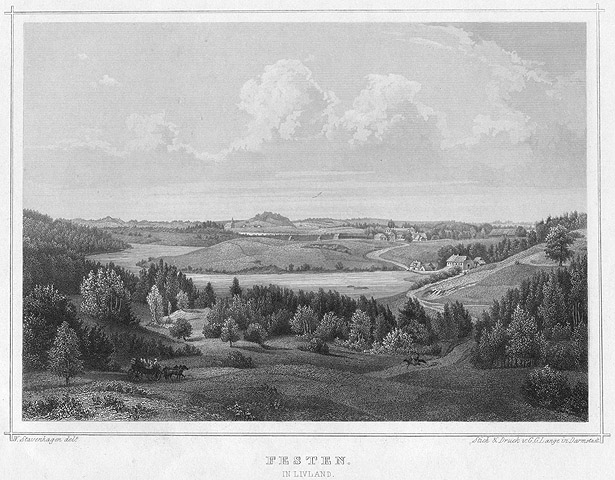

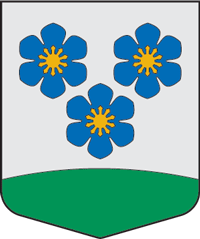
- Coat of arms

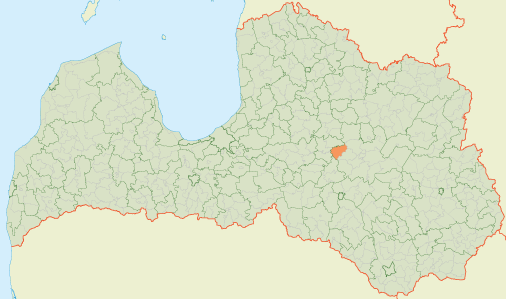
- 56°51′59″N 25°50′59″E
- Country: Latvia

Area
  - Total: 109.39 km^{2} (42.24 sq mi)
  - Land: 109.39 km^{2} (42.24 sq mi)
  - Water: 8.88 km^{2} (3.43 sq mi)

Population (1 January 2024)
  - Total: 504
  - Density: 4.6/km^{2} (12/sq mi)
- Website: www.vestiena.lv/index.php

Vestiena Parish (Latvian: Vestienas pagasts) is an administrative unit of Madona Municipality in the Vidzeme region of Latvia.
