= Madona Municipality =

Municipality of Latvia

Coordinates: 56°51′N 26°13′E

Madona Municipality Madonas novads
- Municipality
- Coat of arms

- Country: Latvia
- Formed: 2009
- Reformed: 2021
- Centre: Madona

Government
  - Council Chair: Agris Lungevičs (ZZS)

Area
  - Total: 3,354.71 km^{2} (1,295.26 sq mi)
  - Land: 3,204.79 km^{2} (1,237.38 sq mi)

Population (2026)
  - Total: 29,466
  - Density: 9.1944/km^{2} (23.813/sq mi)
- Website: www.madona.lv

Madona Municipality (Latvian: Madonas novads) is a municipality in Vidzeme, Latvia. The administrative center is Madona.

The total area of the municipality is 2,153.4 square kilometres (831.4 sq mi), and the population in January 2013 was 26,953. Of these, economically active people were ~ 15,800 in Madona Municipality and 32,000 economically active people in the closest region.

The Point of Inaccessibility (furthest point from any border) for Latvia lies in Madona Municipality at Latitude: 56° 47.5983'N Longitude: 26° 18.9867'E

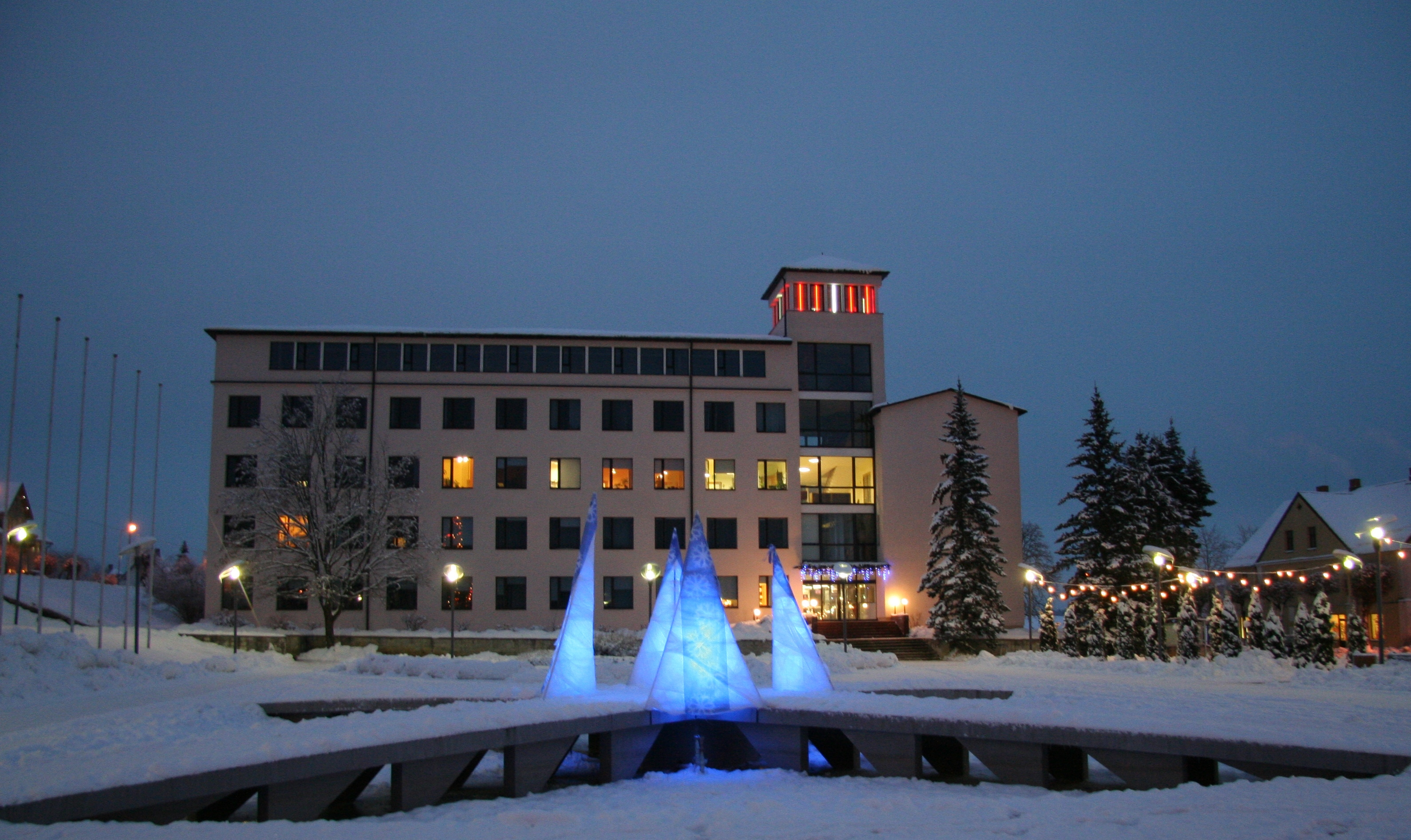
Saieta square, Madona

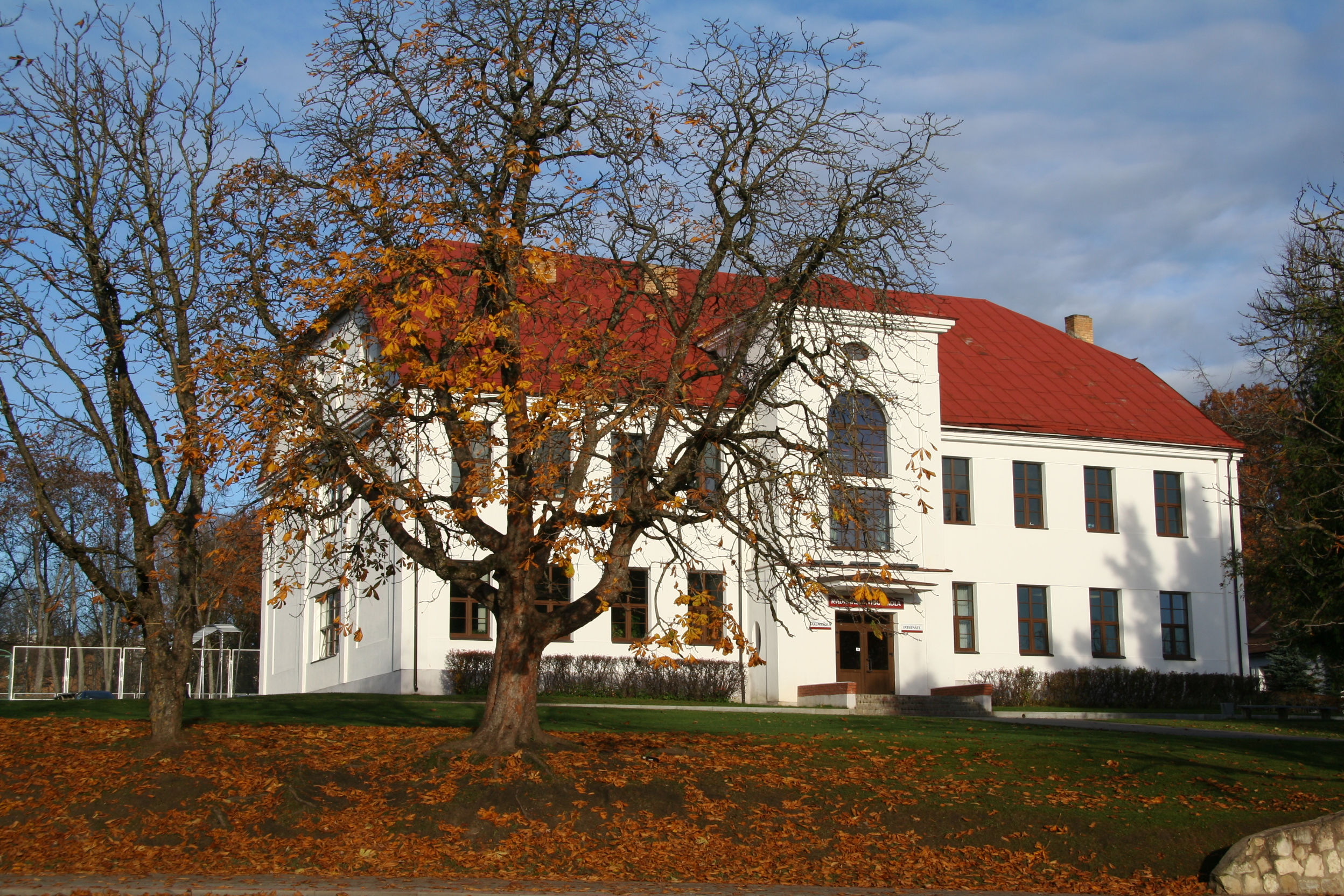
Skola street, Madona

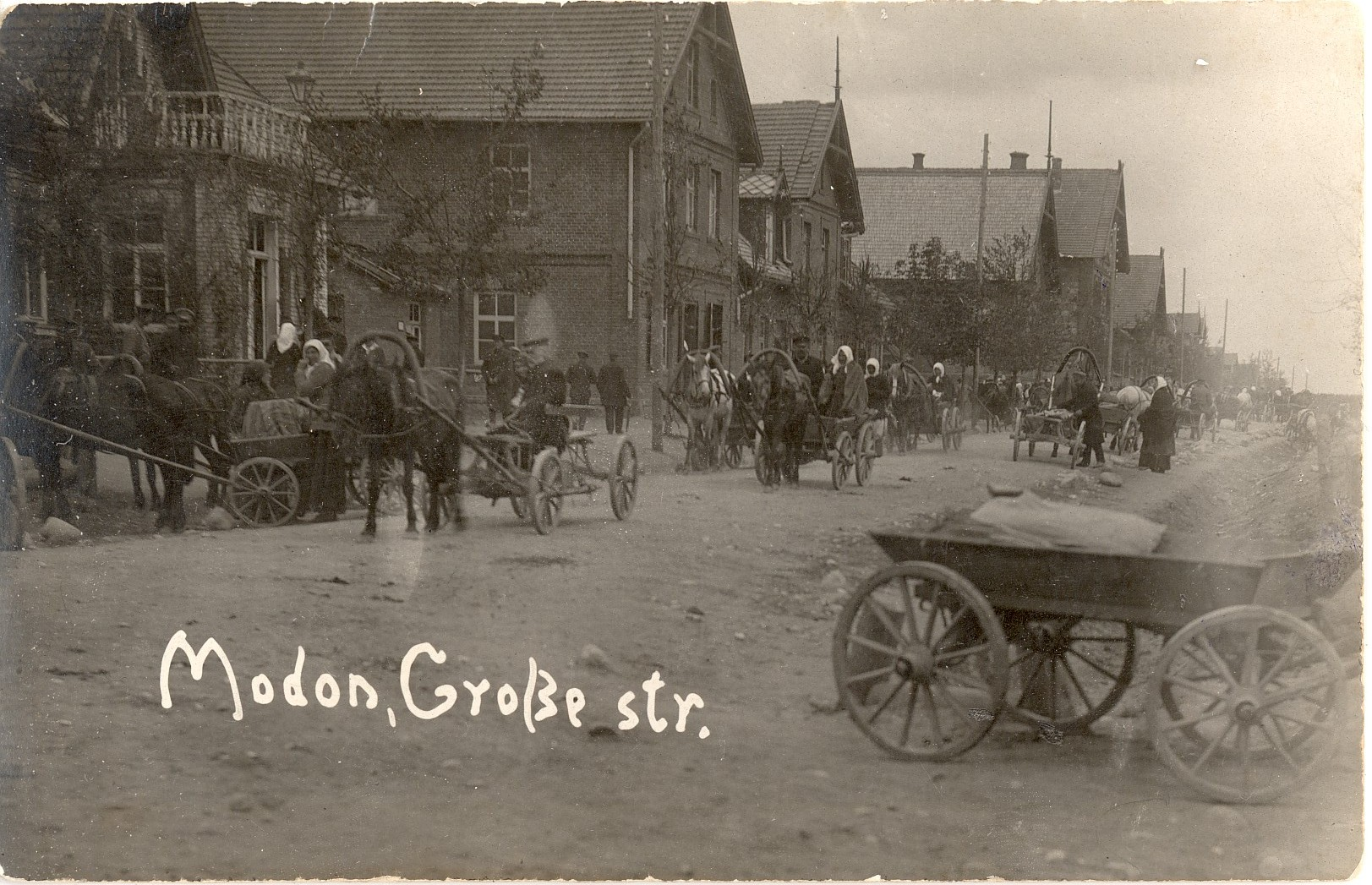
Main street, Madona in 1918

== Administrative divisions ==
The municipality was formed in 2009 by merging the subdivisions of Madona district – Arona parish, Barkava parish, Bērzaune parish, Dzelzava parish, Kalsnava parish, Lazdona parish, Liezēre parish, Ļaudona parish, Mārciena parish, Mētriena parish, Ošupe parish, Prauliena parish, Sarkaņi parish, Vestiena parish and the town of Madona.

As per the 2021 Latvian administrative reform, the municipalities of Madona, Cesvaine, Ērgļi and Lubāna were merged into the reformed Madona Municipality. In 2025 Varakļāni Municipality merged into Madona Municipality.

== Economy ==
On January 1, 2013 in Madona county were registered 2032 business units, from those 4,3% were sole proprietorships, 0,2% joint-stock companies, 35,8% limited liability companies, 0,4% affiliates, 0,2% general partnerships, 9,4% individual businesses, 48,6% farms and 1,1% cooperative societies. In 2012 the number of enterprises per 1000 population reached 78 enterprises, that is relatively higher than the average of Vidzeme region (71) and Latvia (69). During the period from 2009 the number of enterprises per 1000 population in Madona county has increased by 22%. On January 1, 2012 the majority – 94,7% of all economically active enterprises – are micro enterprises, 4,7% small and 6% medium- sized companies. The registered equity capital of enterprises registered in Madona county in January 2013 reached LVL 17'317'302,00, ranking Madona county in 92nd place out of 120.

Forests are one of the most important natural resources in the county. They take up about 45% (97'526,9 hectares) of county territory and 91,5% of the total forest land of county. In general, forest land covers 49% (106'572,1 hectares) of the county area. By the type of ownership, 60% are the private forest land, 38,8% are national forest land and 1,2% are local government forest land. The largest proportion of forests in Madona county is in Lazdona, Sarkaņi, Mārciena, Ļaudona and Liezēre parishes. Agricultural land covers about 39% of the county area. Most of the agricultural lands takes arable lands (63%), pastures (22%), grasslands (14%), fruit orchards (1%). The largest agricultural areas are located Ošupe, Barkava, Prauliena, Ļaudona un Liezēre parishes. Madona county is rich in mineral resources: peat, dolomite, clay, sand and sand-gravel, freshwater limestone, sapropel.

The available agricultural land and forest resource is the determining factor for main lines of business. The largest number of enterprises working in the agricultural and forestry sector (49%), trade and auto repair sectors (11%), manufacturing (6%), professional and technical services (6%). An important business sector in Madona county is tourism. The largest companies by turnover in 2011 are Ltd."Latvāņi", agricultural cooperative company "Barkavas arodi", Ltd. "Henis", JSC "Lazdonas Piensaimnieks", Ltd. "Baltic Eko Park", Ltd. "IMA Signāls", Ltd. "Turbo AK".
Madona county is proud of ecological and natural food producers: JSC "Lazdonas Piensaimnieks", farms "Līvi", "Sveķi", "Kalna Maruškas", "Aizupes", "Jāņkalni", Ltd. "Madonas Patērētāju biedrība" production unit "Madonas Maiznieks", sole trader "55 Mārītes", who in December 2012 set up the joint offer under the brand "Made in Madona county".

Madona county with a branched road network provides needs of the county population and the cargo transport of good through the county. Five national first-class roads, which intersect at the center of the county − in Madona, provides good connections to other regional centers − Cesvaine, Ērgļi, Cēsis, Gulbene, Varakļāni, Pļaviņas, and provides access to the main motorways A6 (Rīga -Daugavpils), A12 (Rīga-Rēzekne), A2 (Rīga - Pskov). Madona county is located in the hearth of East Latvia, there is the same distance to the neighbouring borders and the International Airport (RIX) and Port of Riga. Municipality location provides a solid base for logistics connections with the rest of the Baltic States in Europe as well as with Russia and other markets of CIS countries:

- Riga (Capital of Latvia, Port of Riga, Riga International Airport) − 160 km
- Estonia − 130 km
- Russia − 120 km
- Lithuania − 150 km

The Rīga−Madona−Gulbene railway line crosses Madona county.

Madona municipality has nine foreign cooperation partners in Germany, France, Sweden, Lithuania, Estonia, Russia and Belarus.

Following the total foreign direct investments in capital during the period from 01.01.1991. to 22.11.2012. Madona municipality is in the 38th place between the Latvian municipalities. Foreign direct investments draw up to 12.08% of the total authorized capital amount of companies registered in Madona county. Since 1991, 40 foreign investors invested in enterprises registered in Madona county. Approximately 50% of foreign investments are from European countries. States with the largest number of investors are Germany, Sweden, Denmark, and Italy. In terms of business activities, the largest foreign direct investments have been in farming, forestry, printing, and wholesale of food products. Countries with the largest amount of investments: Germany, Finland, Denmark, Netherlands, Italy.

The registered unemployment rate in Madona county on July 31, 2012 was 12,8% (2011 unemployed persons), of them 56% (1118) were women and 44% (893) men.

== Tourism ==
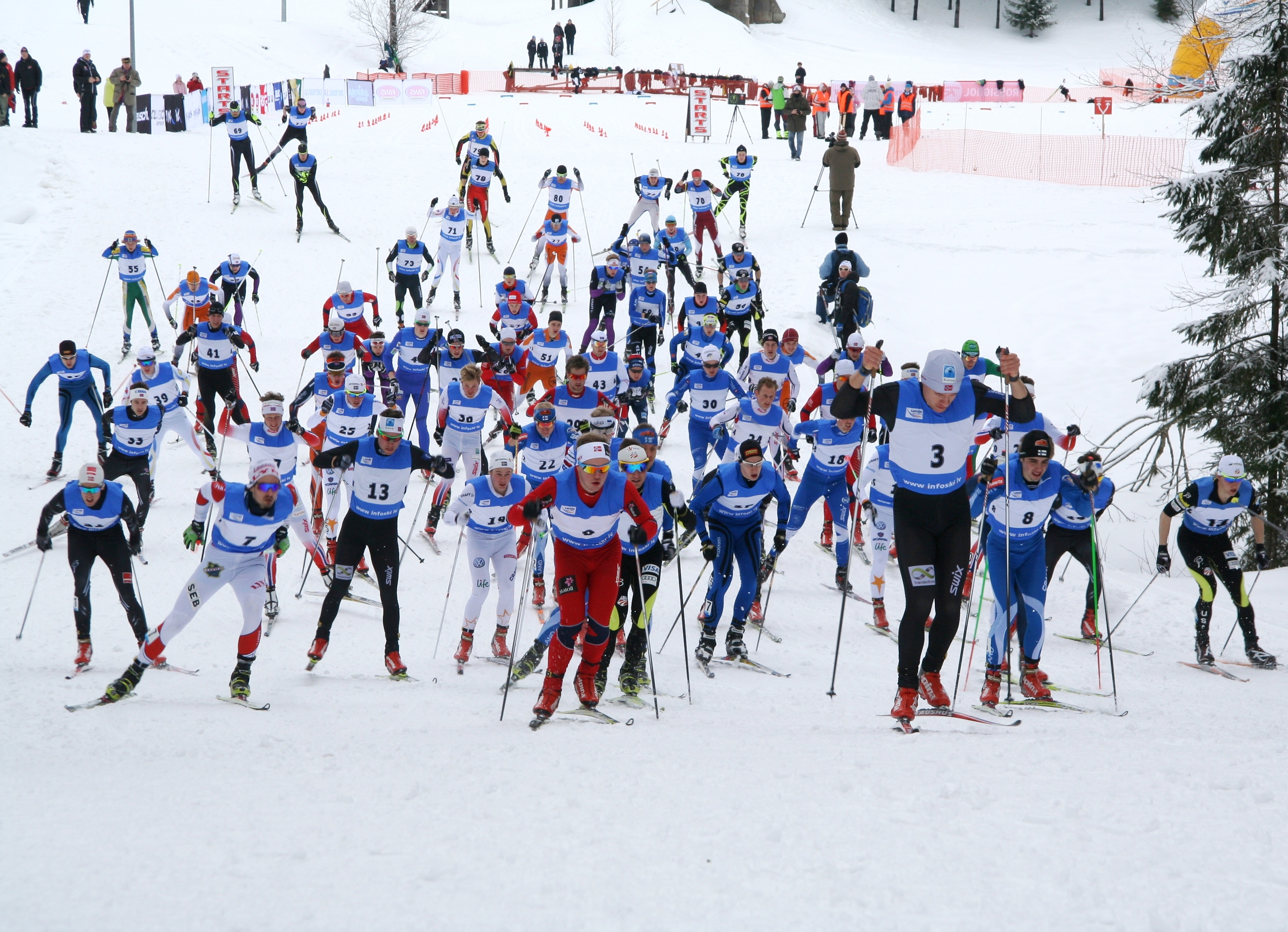
Scandinavian cup 2013 in Sport centre "Smeceres sils"

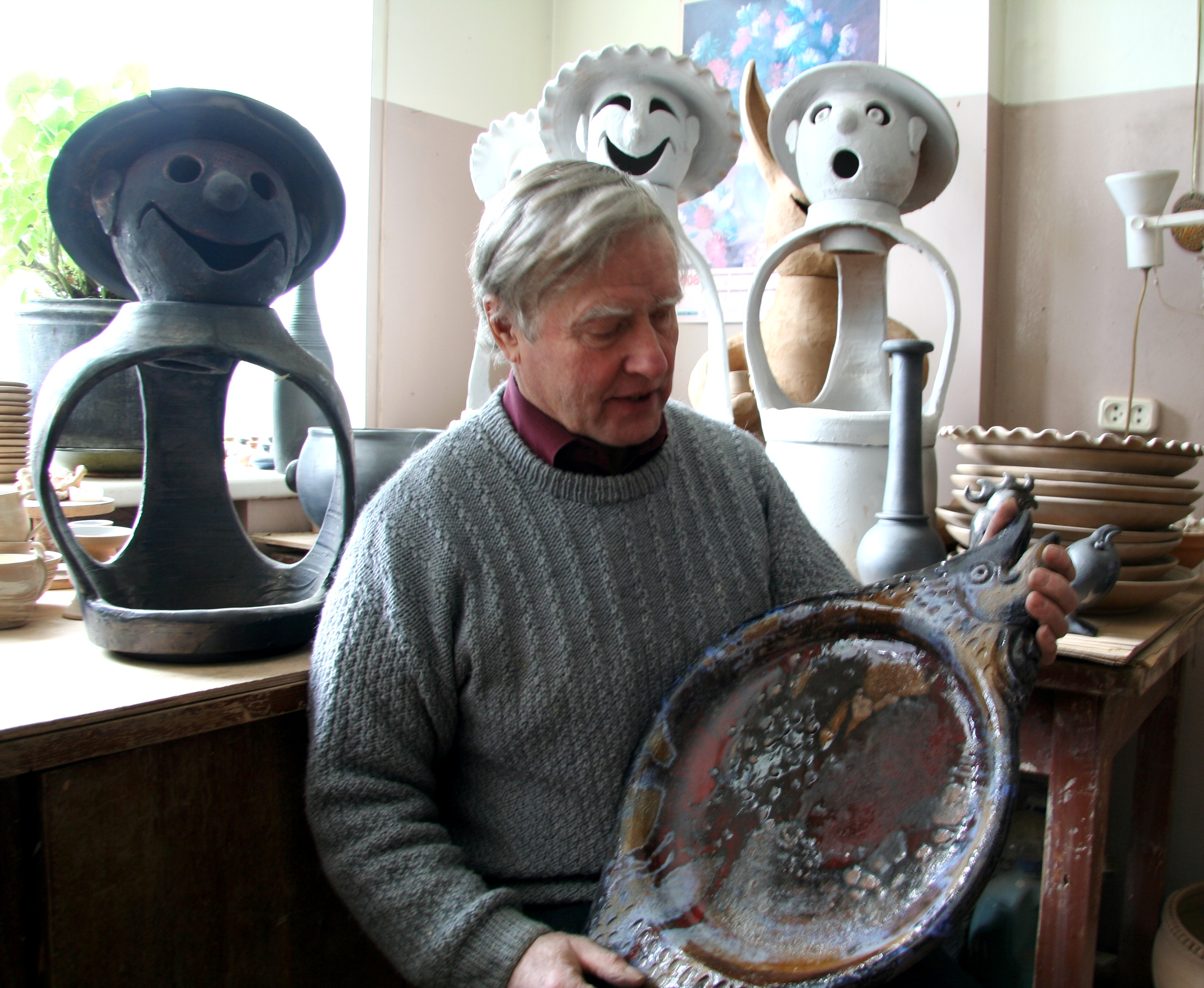
Ceramic Jānis Seiksts, Madona

Madona and its surroundings is one of the most popular Latvian winter recreation areas. This is supported by the hilly terrain and stability of natural snow cover, and well equipped ski resorts, where national and international competitions take place . In winter the snow cover is on average 20 cm thicker and winter lasts for a month longer than elsewhere in Latvia. Citizens can be proud that "Smeceres sils" hosted Worldcup Skiorienteering competitions 2013 and Nordic cross-country ski championship 2013. Sports and recreation centre "Smeceres sils" is specialized in the cross-country skiing and biathlon. There offer different class (from beginner to elite) tracks (4 tracks, length: 1–5 km, the 1,7 km -long track is illuminated). The tracks are prepared with snow motorcycle and modern retrack. In Madona district is the highest point of Latvia − hill Gaiziņkalns. Hill surrounding has evolved winter sports offer − comfortable skiing centers and accommodations. In winter Madona district offers alpine skiing tracks, equipment rentals, instructors, cross-country skiing, snowboarding, the tube-slope, winter activities and entertainment (for example: carnival on Gaiziņkalns hill). The area is hilly with beautiful landscape, wild nature and many lakes, where surroundings are developed for tourism infrastructure. The most popular nature objects are: Teiči and Krustkalni nature reserves. The aim of these reserves is to provide ecosystems with protection and natural development, to keep appropriate living conditions for the diverse species and to study the processes in nature. There is an opportunity for visitors with a guide to see these protected nature territories, use birds watchtower. The total area of the reserve is 19 657 ha and the swamp occupies an area more than 14,000 hectares (35,000 acres). Hill Gaiziņkalns is the highest point of Latvia. It is 311.6 metres (1,022 ft) above sea level. Visitors can take a walk over the 2 km-long walking trail with beautiful views. Kalsnava arboretum is the largest collection of decorative trees and bushes in the eastern part of Latvia. It offers nature trails, excursions, consultations about growing and breeding of trees and bushes, educational programs for children, seminar rooms and a viewing tower. Its total area is 130.37 hectares (322.2 acres). Lubāna lake – the part of largest lake in Latvia − is in Madona district. Along the lake is possible fishing, swimming, using bird watching tower, renting a telescope, and bike rentals.

More and more tourists are visiting interesting farms (thirteen are open for tourists), where there are different activities, for example: baking bread, tasting production of feta cheese, and tours through the farms. Most popular of them are: Rabbits and goats farm "Sveki", goat farm "Līvi", "Kucuri mill" (they offer a mill museum with a collection of antiques and wedding celebrations traditions).

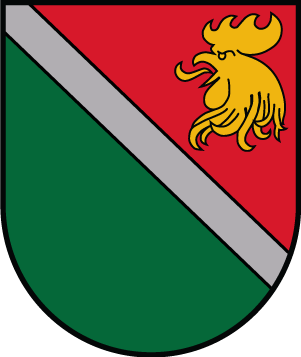
Coat of arms (2011–2021)

Madona district has developed cultural tourism and entertainment. Madona has a local history and art museum, where there are more than 20 exhibitions in a year. They offer the thematic and artistic exhibitions, district archaeological exhibitions and educational programs. Tourists working in different workshops of arts and crafts. Cultural events: Latvian symphonic music festival 29.07.2013., session of guitarist 24.03.2013., International Piano Festival, Fire Sculpture Festival 21.06.2013., Slager music Festival "Zelta Šlāgeris" 27.07.2013., and Madona town festival 07.06.-09.06.2013.

Madona district has well developed accommodations offering: 1 spa hotel, 5 hotels, 13 guest houses, 4 country houses, 11 holiday cottages, 4 hostels, and 6 campgrounds.

== See also ==
- Administrative divisions of Latvia
