= Outline of Latvia =

Country in the Baltic region in Northern Europe

The Flag of Latvia

The Coat of arms of Latvia

The location of Latvia

The following outline is provided as an overview of and topical guide to Latvia:

Latvia – sovereign country located in the Baltic region of Northern Europe. Latvia is bordered to the north by Estonia (343 km), to the south by Lithuania (588 km), and to the east both by Belarus (141 km) and the Russian Federation (276 km). Across the Baltic Sea to the west lies Sweden. The territory of Latvia covers 64,589 km^{2} and is influenced by a temperate seasonal climate.

The Latvians are a Baltic people closely related to the Lithuanians, with the Latvian language sharing many similarities to Lithuanian. Today the Latvians and Lithuanians are the only surviving members of the Baltic peoples and Baltic languages of the Indo-European family. The modern name of Latvia is thought to originate from the ancient Latvian name Latvji, which may have originated from the word Latve which is a name of the river that presumably flowed through what is now eastern Latvia.

Latvia is a democratic parliamentary republic and is divided into 26 districts. The capital and largest city is Riga. Latvia has been a member of the United Nations since 17 September 1991, of the European Union since 1 May 2004 and of NATO since 29 March 2004.

== General reference ==
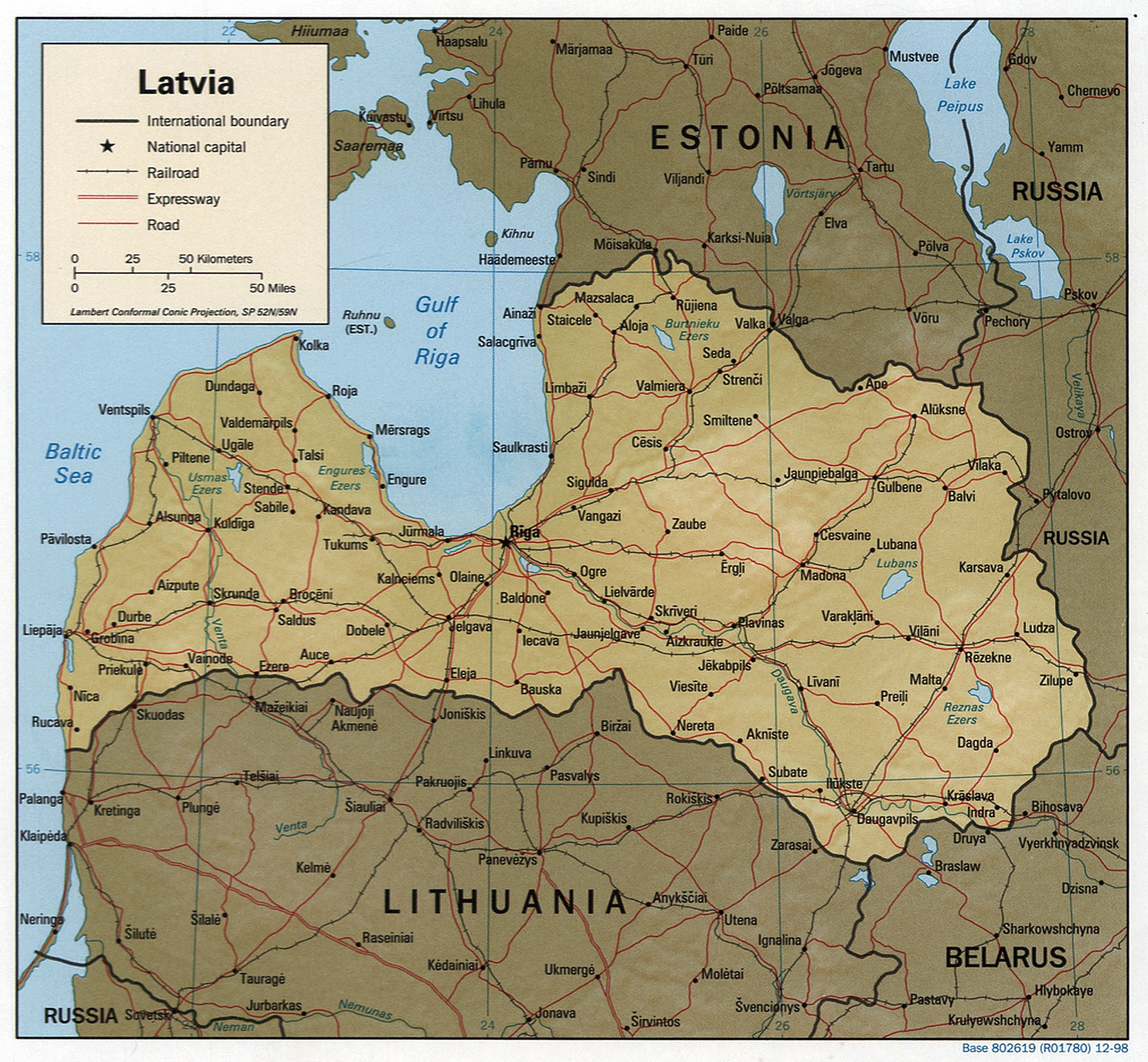
An enlargeable relief map of Latvia

- Pronunciation: /ˈlætviə/
- Common English country name: Latvia
- Official English country name: The Republic of Latvia
- Common endonym(s): Latvija
- Official endonym(s): Latvija
- Adjectival(s): Latvian
- Demonym(s): Latvian
- Etymology: Name of Latvia
- International rankings of Latvia
- ISO country codes: LV, LVA, 428
- ISO region codes: See ISO 3166-2:LV
- Internet country code top-level domain: .lv

== Geography of Latvia ==
- Latvia is: a country
- Location:
  - Northern Hemisphere and Eastern Hemisphere
  - Eurasia
    - Europe
      - Northern Europe
      - Eastern Europe
  - Time zone: Eastern European Time (UTC+02), Eastern European Summer Time (UTC+03)
  - Extreme points of Latvia
    - High: Gaizinkalns 312 m (1,024 ft)
    - Low: Baltic Sea 0 m
  - Land boundaries: 1,382 km

Lithuania 576 km
Estonia 343 km
Russia 292 km
Belarus 171 km

- Coastline: Baltic Sea 498 km

- Population of Latvia: 1,862,700 (1 May, 2024) - 146th most populous country
- Area of Latvia: 64,589 km^{2}
- Atlas of Latvia

=== Environment of Latvia ===
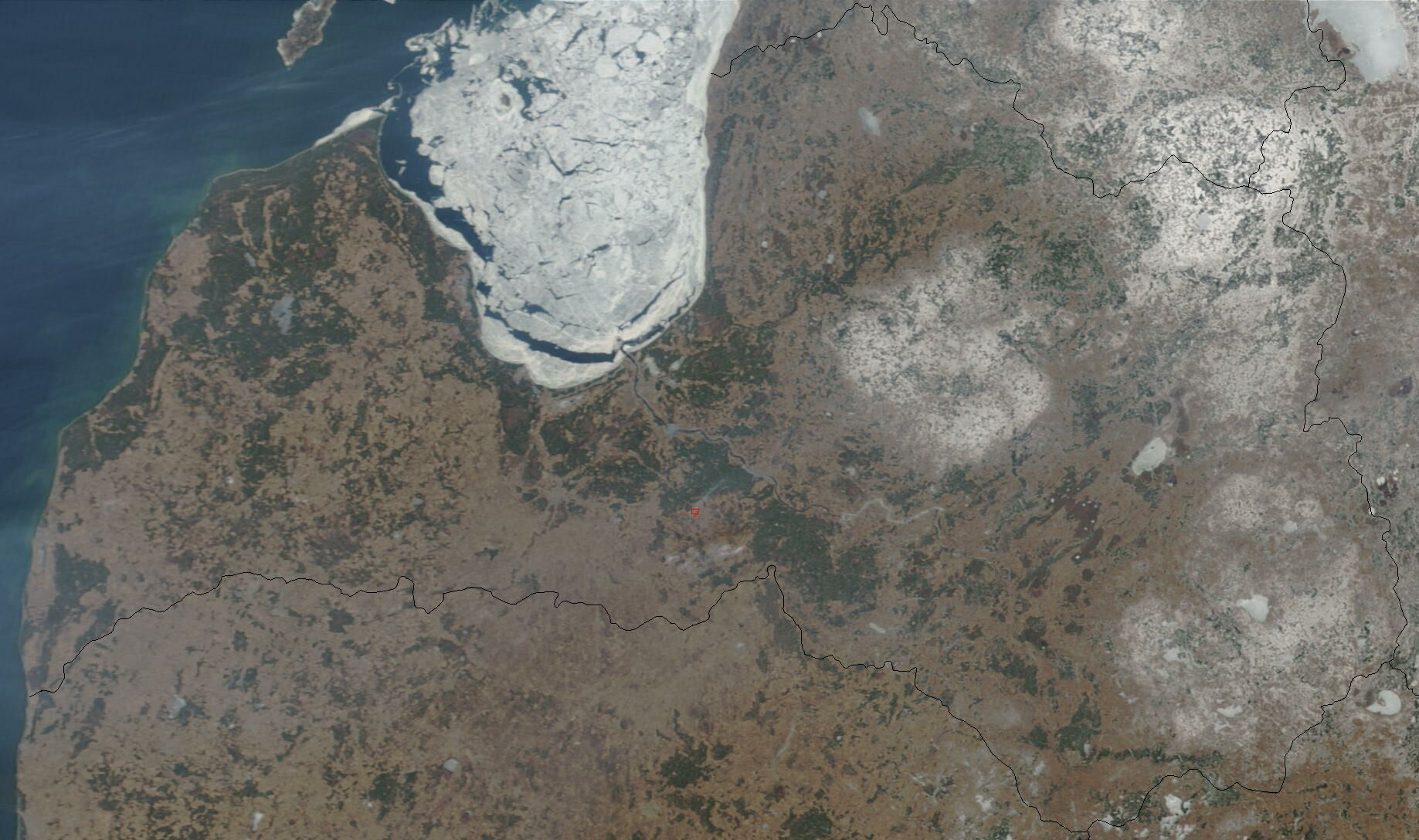
An enlargeable satellite image of Latvia

- Climate of Latvia
- Renewable energy in Latvia
- Geology of Latvia
- Protected areas of Latvia
  - Biosphere reserves in Latvia
  - National parks of Latvia
- Wildlife of Latvia
  - Fauna of Latvia
    - Birds of Latvia
    - Mammals of Latvia

==== Natural geographic features of Latvia ====
- Rivers of Latvia
- World Heritage Sites in Latvia

==== Ecoregions of Latvia ====
List of ecoregions in Latvia

- Ecoregions in Latvia

==== Administrative divisions of Latvia ====
Administrative divisions of Latvia

- Districts of Latvia
  - Subdivisions of Latvia
    - Planning regions of Latvia

===== Regions of Latvia =====
Regions of Latvia (current article is actually about the provinces of Latvia. The new Latvian regions were developed in accordance with EU-standardisation)

===== Districts of Latvia =====
Districts of Latvia

==== Subdivisions of Latvia ====
Subdivisions of Latvia

===== Municipalities of Latvia =====
- Capital of Latvia: Riga
- List of cities in Latvia

=== Demography of Latvia ===
Demographics of Latvia

== Government and politics of Latvia ==
Politics of Latvia

- Form of government: Representative democracy; unitary parliamentary republic
- Capital of Latvia: Riga
- Elections in Latvia
- Political parties in Latvia

=== Branches of the government of Latvia ===
Government of Latvia

==== Executive branch of the government of Latvia ====
- Head of state: President of Latvia, Edgars Rinkēvičs
- Head of government: Prime Minister of Latvia, Andris Kulbergs
- Cabinet of Latvia

==== Legislative branch of the government of Latvia ====
- Parliament of Latvia (unicameral)

==== Judicial branch of the government of Latvia ====
Court system of Latvia

- Supreme Court of Latvia

=== Foreign relations of Latvia ===
Foreign relations of Latvia

- Diplomatic missions in Latvia
- Diplomatic missions of Latvia

==== International organization membership ====
The Republic of Latvia is a member of:

- Australia Group
- Baltic Assembly (BA)
- Bank for International Settlements (BIS)
- Council of Europe (CE)
- Council of the Baltic Sea States (CBSS)
- Euro-Atlantic Partnership Council (EAPC)
- European Bank for Reconstruction and Development (EBRD)
- European Investment Bank (EIB)
- European Union (EU)
- Food and Agriculture Organization (FAO)
- International Atomic Energy Agency (IAEA)
- International Bank for Reconstruction and Development (IBRD)
- International Civil Aviation Organization (ICAO)
- International Criminal Court (ICCt)
- International Criminal Police Organization (Interpol)
- International Development Association (IDA)
- International Federation of Red Cross and Red Crescent Societies (IFRCS)
- International Finance Corporation (IFC)
- International Hydrographic Organization (IHO)
- International Labour Organization (ILO)
- International Maritime Organization (IMO)
- International Mobile Satellite Organization (IMSO)
- International Monetary Fund (IMF)
- International Olympic Committee (IOC)
- International Organization for Migration (IOM)
- International Organization for Standardization (ISO) (correspondent)
- International Red Cross and Red Crescent Movement (ICRM)
- International Telecommunication Union (ITU)
- International Trade Union Confederation (ITUC)
- Inter-Parliamentary Union (IPU)
- Multilateral Investment Guarantee Agency (MIGA)
- Nordic Investment Bank (NIB)
- North Atlantic Treaty Organization (NATO)
- Nuclear Suppliers Group (NSG)
- Organisation internationale de la Francophonie (OIF) (observer)
- Organization for Security and Cooperation in Europe (OSCE)
- Organisation for the Prohibition of Chemical Weapons (OPCW)
- Organization of American States (OAS) (observer)
- Permanent Court of Arbitration (PCA)
- Schengen Convention
- United Nations (UN)
- United Nations Conference on Trade and Development (UNCTAD)
- United Nations Educational, Scientific, and Cultural Organization (UNESCO)
- Universal Postal Union (UPU)
- Western European Union (WEU) (associate partner)
- World Customs Organization (WCO)
- World Federation of Trade Unions (WFTU)
- World Health Organization (WHO)
- World Intellectual Property Organization (WIPO)
- World Meteorological Organization (WMO)
- World Tourism Organization (UNWTO)
- World Trade Organization (WTO)
- Zangger Committee (ZC) (permanent observer)

=== Law and order in Latvia ===
Law of Latvia

- Capital punishment in Latvia
- Constitution of Latvia
- Crime in Latvia
- Human rights in Latvia
  - Latvian citizenship law
  - LGBT rights in Latvia
  - Freedom of religion in Latvia
- Law enforcement in Latvia

=== Military of Latvia ===
Military of Latvia

- Command
  - Commander-in-chief:
    - Ministry of Defence of Latvia
- Forces
  - Army of Latvia
  - Navy of Latvia
  - Air Force of Latvia
  - Special forces of Latvia
- Military history of Latvia
- Military ranks of Latvia

=== Local government in Latvia ===
Local government in Latvia

== History of Latvia ==
History of Latvia

- Timeline of the history of Latvia
- Current events of Latvia
- Military history of Latvia

== Culture of Latvia ==
Culture of Latvia

- Architecture of Latvia
- Cuisine of Latvia
- Festivals in Latvia
- Humor in Latvia
- Languages of Latvia
- Media in Latvia
- National symbols of Latvia
  - Coat of arms of Latvia
  - Flag of Latvia
  - National anthem of Latvia
- People of Latvia
- Prostitution in Latvia
- Public holidays in Latvia
- Records of Latvia
- Religion in Latvia
  - Christianity in Latvia
    - Roman Catholicism in Latvia
    - Latvian Orthodox Church
  - Islam in Latvia
  - Judaism in Latvia
  - Sikhism in Latvia
- World Heritage Sites in Latvia

=== Art in Latvia ===
- Art in Latvia
- Cinema of Latvia
- Literature of Latvia
- Music of Latvia
- Television in Latvia
- Theatre in Latvia

=== Sports in Latvia ===
Sports in Latvia

- Football in Latvia
- Ice Hockey in Latvia
- Basketball in Latvia
- Athletics in Latvia
- Tennis in Latvia
- Cycling in Latvia
- Floorball in Latvia
- Latvia at the Olympics

== Economy and infrastructure of Latvia ==
Economy of Latvia

- Economic rank, by nominal GDP (2007): 82nd (eighty-second)
- Agriculture in Latvia
- Banking in Latvia
  - National Bank of Latvia
- Communications in Latvia
  - Internet in Latvia
  - Telephone numbers in Latvia
- Companies of Latvia
- Currency of Latvia: Euro
  - ISO 4217: EUR
- Energy in Latvia
  - Energy policy of Latvia
  - Oil industry in Latvia
- Health care in Latvia
- Mining in Latvia
- Latvian Real Estate (needs fixing)
- Riga Stock Exchange
- Tourism in Latvia
- Transport in Latvia
  - Airports in Latvia
  - Rail transport in Latvia
  - Roads in Latvia

== Education in Latvia ==
Education in Latvia

== Civil society organisations in Latvia ==
- Latvian Medical Foundation
- School of Young Geographers

== See also ==
Latvia

- Index of Latvia-related articles
- List of international rankings
- Member state of the European Union
- Member state of the North Atlantic Treaty Organization
- Member state of the United Nations
- Outline of Europe
- Outline of geography
