= List of companies of Latvia =

Location of Latvia

Latvia is a country in the Baltic region of Northern Europe, one of the three Baltic states. Latvia is a democratic and developed country and member of the European Union, NATO, the Council of Europe, the United Nations, CBSS, the IMF, Nordic-Baltic Eight, NIB, OECD, OSCE, and WTO. For 2014, Latvia was listed 46th on the Human Development Index and as a high income country on 1 July 2014. It used the Latvian lats as its currency until it was replaced by the euro on 1 January 2014.

For further information on the types of business entities in this country and their abbreviations, see "Business entities in Latvia".

== Notable firms ==
This list includes notable companies with primary headquarters located in the country. The industry and sector follow the Industry Classification Benchmark taxonomy. Organizations which have ceased operations are included and noted as defunct.

Notable companies Status: P=Private, S=State; A=Active, D=Defunct
Name	Industry	Sector	Headquarters	Founded	Notes	Status	
ABLV Bank	Financials	Banks	Riga	1993	Private bank, defunct 2018	P	D
Aerodium Latvia	Industrials	Industrial machinery	Sigulda	2004	Wind tunnels	P	A
AirBaltic	Consumer services	Airlines	Riga	1995	National airline	S	A
Ave Line	Industrials	Marine transportation	Riga	2000	Shipping	P	A
Baltic Coal Terminal	Industrials	Transportation services	Ventspils	2005	Terminal	P	A
Banka Baltija	Financials	Banks	Riga	1993	Bank, defunct 1995	P	D
Bank of Latvia	Financials	Banks	Riga	1992	Central bank	S	A
Bellaccord Electro	Consumer services	Broadcasting & entertainment	Riga	1931	Record label	P	D
Cēsu Alus	Consumer goods	Brewers	Cēsis	1590	Brewery	P	A
Citadele Banka	Financials	Banks	Riga	2010	Bank	P	A
Dartz	Consumer goods	Automobiles	Riga	2008	Armored vehicles	P	A
Diena	Consumer services	Publishing	Riga	1990	Daily newspaper	P	A
Double Coffee	Consumer services	Restaurants & bars	Riga	2002	Coffee chain	P	A
Dzintars	Consumer goods	Personal goods	Riga	1991	Cosmetics and perfumery, defunct 2023	P	D
Elko Grupa	Consumer goods	Consumer electronics	Riga	1993	Computers and electronics	P	A
Ford-Vairogs	Consumer goods	Automobiles	Riga	1936	Automotive, defunct 1940	P	D
Forticom	Technology	Software	Riga	1999	Defunct 2013	P	D
Grindeks	Health care	Pharmaceuticals	Riga	1991	Pharmaceutical	P	A
Inversija	Industrials	Delivery services	Riga	1991	Cargo airline. defunct 2012	P	D
Just5	Telecommunications	Telecommunications equipment	Riga	2008	Mobile phone designer	P	A
Laima	Consumer goods	Food products	Riga	1870	Confectionery	P	A
Tet	Telecommunications	Fixed line telecommunications	Riga	1992	Telecom and ISP	P	A
Latvenergo	Utilities	Conventional electricity	Riga	1958	Electrical utility	S	A
Latvian Mobile Telephone	Telecommunications	Mobile telecommunications	Riga	1992	GSM	P	A
Latvian Shipping Company	Industrials	Marine transportation	Riga	1940	Shipping	P	A
Latvijas Balzams	Consumer goods	Soft drinks	Riga	1997	Beverages	P	A
Latvijas Gāze	Oil & gas	Exploration & production	Riga	1991	Natural gas	P	A
Latvijas Krājbanka	Financials	Banks	Riga	1924	Bank, defunct 2011	P	D
Latvijas Pasts	Logistics	Delivery services	Riga	1992	Postal service	S	A
Microphone Records	Consumer services	Broadcasting & entertainment	Riga	1993	Record label	P	A
PNB Banka	Financials	Banks	Riga	1992	Bank, defunct 2019	P	D
Olpha	Health care	Pharmaceuticals	Olaine	1972	Pharmaceutical	P	A
Parex Bank	Financials	Banks	Riga	1992	Bank	P	A
PrivatBank Latvia	Financials	Banks	Riga	2007	Bank, part of PrivatBank (Ukraine)	P	A
RAF-Avia	Consumer services	Airlines	Riga	1990	Airline	P	A
Rietumu Banka	Financials	Banks	Riga	1992	Bank	P	A
Riga Autobus Factory	Consumer goods	Automobiles	Riga	1949	Vehicles, defunct 1998	P	D
Rimi Baltic	Consumer services	Food retailers & wholesalers	Riga	2004	General retail and supermarkets	P	A
Russo-Balt	Consumer goods	Automobiles	Riga	1874	Automobiles, defunct 1923	P	D
SAF Tehnika	Technology	Telecommunications equipment	Riga	1999	Microwave data equipment	P	A
Scandiweb	Information Technology and Services	Technology	Rīga	2003	Web Development, Marketing	P	A
SEB banka	Financials	Banks	Riga	1993	Bank	P	A
Sereal	Consumer goods	Recreational products	Riga	2011	Trading cards and stickers	P	A
SmartLynx Airlines	Consumer services	Airlines	Mārupe	1993	Airline	P	A
VEF	Consumer goods	Consumer electronics	Riga	1919	Electronics, defunct 1999	P	D

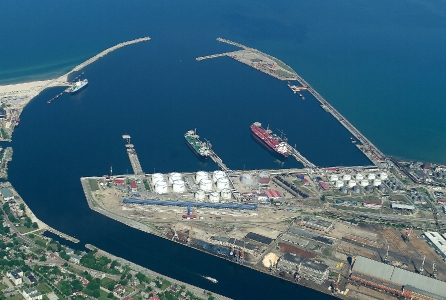
The Free port of Ventspils is one of the busiest ports in the Baltic states.

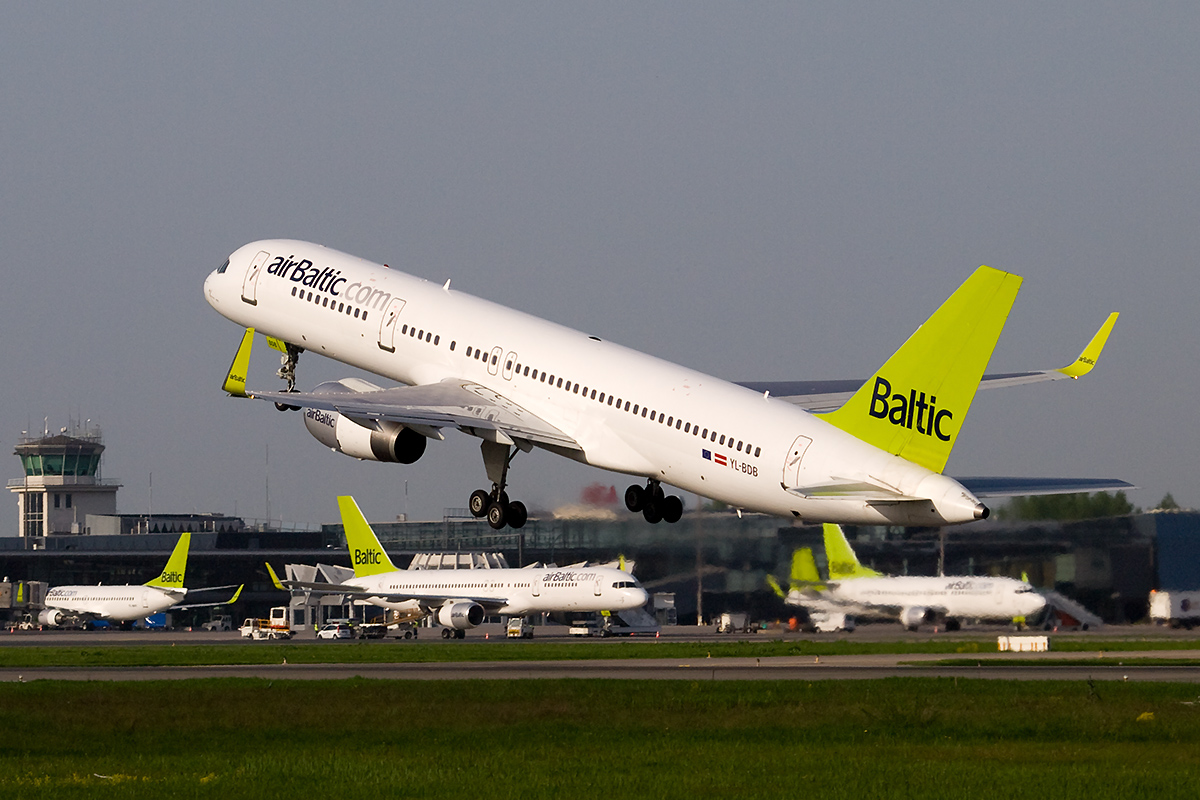
An airBaltic Boeing 757−200WL.

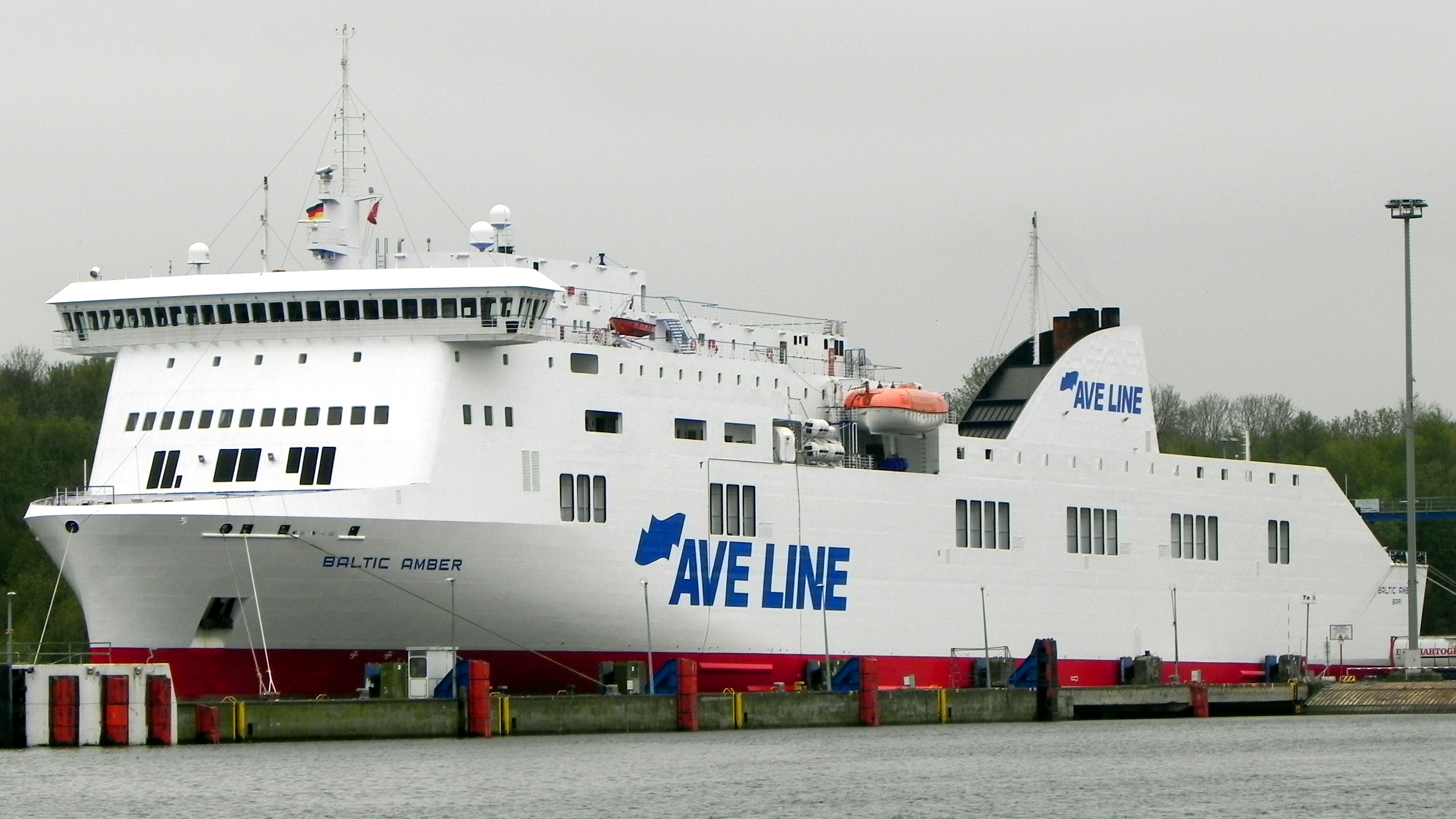
Ave Line ferry M/S Baltic Amber.

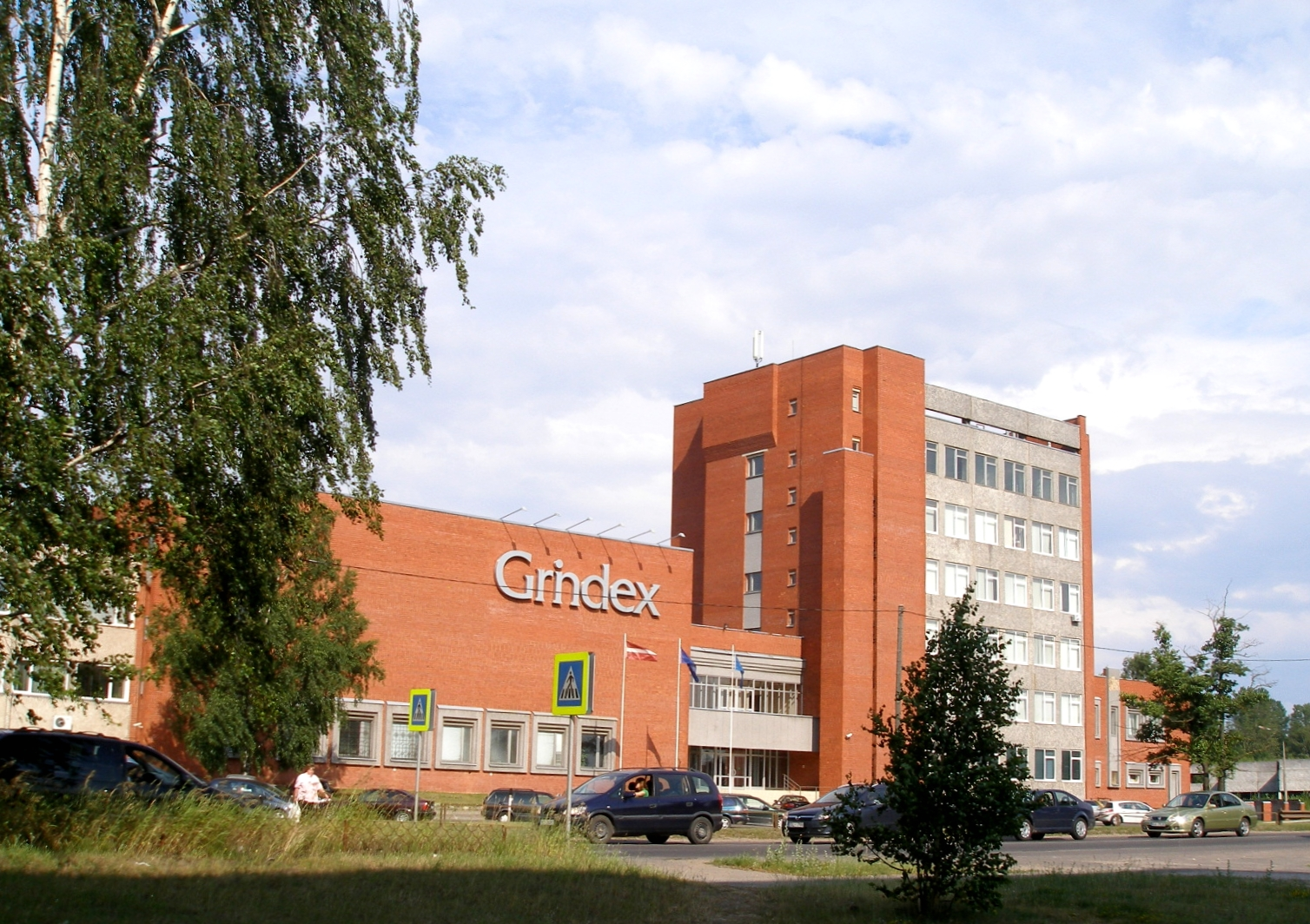
Grindeks headquarters in Riga.

== See also ==
- Economy of Latvia
- List of airlines of Latvia
- List of banks in Latvia
- List of supermarket chains in Latvia
