= Economy of Latvia =

- Riga Central Station, business hub area
- Currency: Euro (EUR, €)
- Fiscal year: Calendar year
- Trade organisations: EU, OECD and WTO
- Country group: Advanced economy; High-income economy

Statistics
- Population: ▼1,853,400 (2024)
- GDP: ▲$53.686 billion (nominal, 2026); ▲$85.118 billion (PPP, 2026)
- GDP rank: 94th (nominal, 2026); 110th (PPP, 2026)
- GDP growth: 2.1% (2025); 2.8% (2026f)
- GDP per capita: ▲$28,913 (nominal, 2026); ▲$45,840 (PPP, 2026)
- GDP per capita rank: 50th (nominal, 2026); 53th (PPP, 2026)
- GDP per capita growth: 3.2% (2025)
- GDP by sector: agriculture: 5%; industry: 21%; services: 74%; (2025)
- Inflation (CPI): 3.7% (2025); 3.6% (2026f)
- Population below national poverty line: ▼24.3% at risk of poverty or social exclusion (AROPE, 2024)
- Gini coefficient: ▲34.2 medium (2024)
- Human Development Index: ▲0.889 very high (2023) (41st); ▲0.812 very high (IHDI (38th)) (2023)
- Corruption Perceptions Index: ▼59 out of 100 points (2024) (38th)
- Labour force: ▲977,523 (2023); ▲77.5% employment rate (2023)
- Labour force by occupation: agriculture: 7.7%; industry: 24.1%; services: 68.1%; (2016 est.)
- Unemployment: ▼6.8% (December 2024)
- Youth unemployment: ▲14.8% (2025)
- Average gross salary: €1,886 monthly (2026, Quarter 2)
- Average net salary: €1,401 monthly (2026, Quarter 2)
- Main industries: processed foods, processed wood products, textiles, processed metals, pharmaceuticals, railroad cars, synthetic fibers, electronics

External
- Exports: ▲$31.421 billion (2026)
- Export goods: foodstuffs, wood and wood products, metals, machinery and equipment, textiles
- Main export partners: Lithuania 23.10%; Estonia 8.01%; Germany 7.90%; Russia 7.82%; Sweden 7.13%; United Kingdom 6.98%; Belarus 6.67%; Saudi Arabia 6.62%; Netherlands 6.40%; France 6.12%; (2026)
- Imports: ▲$37.10 billion (2026)
- Import goods: machinery and equipment, consumer goods, chemicals, fuels, vehicles
- Main import partners: Lithuania 21.40%; Germany 12.38%; Poland 10.99%; Estonia 9.31%; Finland 5.83%; China 5.31%; Bulgaria 4.36%; Sweden 3.98%; United States 3.42%; Italy 3.22%; (2026)
- FDI stock: ▲ Inward: $1.32 billion (2023); ▲ Outward: $0.63 billion (2023)
- Current account: ▼ −$1.708 billion (2024); ▲3.75% of GDP (2024)

Public finance
- Government debt: ▼43.8% of GDP (2024); ▲€19.90 billion (2024)
- Foreign reserves: ▲$4.95 billion (2023 est.)
- Budget balance: €1.3 billion deficit (2024); −2.9% of GDP (2024)
- Revenue: 37.8% of GDP (2024)
- Spending: 40.8% of GDP (2024)
- Economic aid: €4.6 billion from European Structural and Investment Funds (2007–2013); €5.63 billion from European Structural and Investment Funds (2014–2020)
- Credit rating: Standard & Poor's: A (Domestic); A (Foreign); AAA (T&C Assessment); Outlook: Stable; Moody's: A3; Outlook: Stable; Fitch: A−; Outlook: Stable; Scope: A−; Outlook: Stable
- All values, unless otherwise stated, are in US dollars.

The economy of Latvia is a developed mixed economy. Part of the European single market, the nation has an open trade policy and trades extensively. Latvia has been a member of the World Trade Organization (WTO) since 1999, a member of the European Union since 2004, a member of the Eurozone since 2014 and a member of the OECD since 2016. In the World Bank's final Doing Business report, Doing Business 2020, Latvia ranked 19th for ease of doing business. According to the Human Development Report 2023-24 by the United Nations Development Programme, Latvia has a HDI score of 0.879 (2022). Due to its geographical location, transit services are highly developed, along with timber and wood processing, agriculture and food products, as well as manufacturing of machinery and electronic devices.

Latvia's economy has had rapid GDP growth of more than 10% per year before it entered a severe recession in 2009 as a result of an unsustainable current account deficit, collapse of the real estate market, and large debt exposure amid the softening world economy. Triggered by the collapse of Parex Bank, the second largest bank, GDP decreased by almost 18% in 2009, and the European Union, the International Monetary Fund, and other international donors provided substantial financial assistance to Latvia as part of an agreement to defend the currency's peg to the euro in exchange for the government's commitment to stringent austerity measures. In 2011 Latvia achieved GDP growth by 5.5% and thus was again among the fastest growing economies in the European Union. The IMF/EU program successfully concluded in December 2011.

Privatization is mostly complete, except for some of the large state-owned utilities. Export growth contributed to the economic recovery, however, the bulk of the country's economic activity is in the services sector.

== Economic history ==
Real GDP per capita development in Baltic states vs EU average

For centuries under Hanseatic and German influence and then during its inter-war independence, Latvia used its geographic location as an important east–west commercial and trading centre. Industry served local markets, while timber, paper and agricultural products were Latvia's main exports.

Prior to World War I, Latvia was an advanced manufacturing hub within the Russian Empire, primarily serving the Russian market. After attaining independence in 1918, Latvia lost its status as an advanced manufacturing hub. Latvia sought in the interwar period to become an international exporter of food and to re-industrialize. Latvia experienced growth in GDP per capita during the interwar period, although some economic historians have argued that there was stagnation in the period of the authoritarian Karlis Ulmanis regime (1934–1940).

After reestablishing its independence, Latvia proceeded with market-oriented reforms, albeit at a measured pace. Its freely traded currency, the lat, was introduced in 1993 and held steady, or appreciated, against major world currencies. Inflation was reduced from 958.6% in 1992 to 25% by 1995 and 1.4% by 2002.

After contracting substantially between 1991 and 1995, the economy steadied in late 1994, led by a recovery in light industry and a boom in commerce and finance. This recovery was interrupted twice, first by a banking crisis and the bankruptcy of Banka Baltija, Latvia's largest bank, in 1995 and second by a severe crisis in the financial system of neighbouring Russia in 1998. After 2000, Latvian GDP grew by 6–8% a year for 4 consecutive years. Latvia's state budget was balanced in 1997 but the 1998 Russian financial crisis resulted in large deficits, which were reduced from 4% of GDP in 1999 to 1.8% in 2003. These deficits were smaller than in most of the other countries joining the European Union in 2004.

Until the middle of 2008, Latvia had the fastest developing economy in Europe. In 2003, GDP growth was 7.5% and inflation was 2.9%. The centrally planned system of the Soviet period was replaced with a structure based on free-market principles. In 2005, private sector share in GDP was 70%. Recovery in light industry and Riga's emergence as a regional financial and commercial centre offset shrinkage of the state-owned industrial sector and agriculture. The official unemployment figure was held steady in the 7%–10% range.

=== Economic contraction in 2008–2010 ===
The 2008 financial crisis severely disrupted the Latvian economy, primarily as a result of the easy credit bubble that began building up during 2004. The bubble burst leading to a rapidly weakening economy, resulting in a budget, wage and unemployment crisis. Latvia had the worst economic performance in 2009, with annual growth rate averaging −18%.

The Latvian economy entered a phase of fiscal contraction during the second half of 2008 after an extended period of credit-based speculation and unrealistic inflation of real estate values. The national account deficit for 2007, for example, represented more than 22% of the GDP for the year while inflation was running at 10%. By 2009 unemployment rose to 23% and was the highest in the EU.

Paul Krugman, the Nobel Laureate in economics for 2008, wrote in his New York Times Op-Ed column for 15 December 2008:

"The acutest problems are on Europe's periphery, where many smaller economies are experiencing crises strongly reminiscent of past crises in Latin America and Asia: Latvia is the new Argentina".

By August 2009, Latvia's GDP had fallen by 20% year on year, with Standard & Poor's predicting a further 16% contraction to come. The International Monetary Fund suggested a devaluation of Latvia's currency, but the European Union objected to this, on the grounds that the majority of Latvia's debt was denominated in foreign currencies. Financial economist Michael Hudson has advocated for redenominating foreign currency liabilities in Latvian lats before devaluing.

However, by 2010 there were indications that Latvia's policy of internal devaluation was successful.

=== Economic recovery 2010–2012 ===
The economic situation has since 2010 improved, and by 2012 Latvia was described as a success by IMF managing director Christine Lagarde showing strong growth forecasts. The Latvian economy grew by 5.5% in 2011 and by 5.6% in 2012 reaching the highest rate of growth in Europe. The GDP surpassed the pre-crisis level in 2018.

=== Economic issues 2022-23 ===
The Russian invasion of Ukraine in February 2022 caused some economic problems in Latvia. Real GDP growth slowed to 2.8 percent in 2022 from 4.3 percent in 2021. Russia was a major trade partner and EU sanctions impacted this. Dramatic rises in the cost of energy, the need to seek alternative sources of gas and oil as well as logistics issues resulted in inflation averaging 17.2% in 2022 before falling back to single digits in 2023.

== Privatisation ==
Privatisation in Latvia is almost complete. Virtually all of the previously state-owned small and medium companies have been privatized, leaving only a small number of politically sensitive large state companies. In particular, the country's main energy and utility company, Latvenergo remains state-owned and there are no plans to privatize it. The government also holds minority shares in Ventspils Nafta oil transit company and the country's main telecom company Lattelecom but it plans to relinquish its shares in the near future.

Foreign investment in Latvia is still modest compared with the levels in north-central Europe. A law expanding the scope for selling land, including land sales to foreigners, was passed in 1997. Representing 10.2% of Latvia's total foreign direct investment, American companies invested $127 million in 1999. In the same year, the United States exported $58.2 million of goods and services to Latvia and imported $87.9 million. Eager to join Western economic institutions like the World Trade Organization, OECD, and the European Union, Latvia signed a Europe Agreement with the EU in 1995 with a 4-year transition period. Latvia and the United States have signed treaties on investment, trade, and intellectual property protection and avoidance of double taxation.

== Employment ==
Average wages are higher in Riga and Ventspils and their surroundings, with inland border regions lagging behind, mainly the region of Latgale.

Employed-unemployed in Latvia in workforce 15–74 years old (thousand people) 1996-2017 and chain-linked GDP reference year 2010 (bln EUR). Data: Statistics Latvia

510-593
594-676
677-759
760-842
843-925
926-1008
1009-1091
1092-1170
Average monthly gross wages in cities under state jurisdiction and counties (in euro) 2017. Excluding private sector enterprises with number of employees < 50. Data: Central Statistical Bureau of Latvia

== Sectors ==
=== Agriculture ===
Latvia produced in 2018:

- 1.4 million tons of wheat;
- 426 thousand tons of potato;
- 306 thousand tons of barley;
- 229 thousand tons of rapeseed;
- 188 thousand tons of oat;
- 81 thousand tons of rye;
- 80 thousand tons of bean;

In addition to smaller productions of other agricultural products.

=== Manufacturing ===
- Ogres Knitwear, since 1965

=== Services ===
In 2022, the sector with the highest number of companies registered in Latvia is Services with 71,692 companies followed by Retail Trade and Finance, Insurance, and Real Estate with 15,300 and 10,287 companies respectively.

==== Tourism ====
Tourist arrivals of 2024 in %

Tourism in Latvia is an emerging industry in the nation of Latvia. 2.8 million visitors were recorded in 2018, an increase of 8% compared to 2017. In 2016, tourism contributed 4.5% of Latvia's GVA, and counted for 1.3 million euros in export revenue, and tourism-related industries accounted for 8.5% of total employment, or 77100 jobs in total. This was accompanied by significant growth in the number of hotels and accommodations in Latvia, rising 37% from 607 in 2018 to 831 in 2018, according to a 2020 OECD report. Most tourists in Latvia come from neighbouring countries, primarily Russia, Germany, and the other two Baltic states, Estonia and Lithuania. Most tourists stayed in Riga, the national capital. However, domestic tourism has been on the rise in Latvia, with less and less Latvians willing to travel abroad.

The Ministry of Economics manages tourism policy in Latvia, as determined by the 1998 Tourism Law, and owns the Investment and Development Agency of Latvia, an organization responsible for enactment of tourism policy in Latvia. The total budget for tourism in Latvia in 2018 was 2.6 million euros, combining funding from the state, the European Regional Development Fund, and from the European Destinations of Excellence programme. In 2014, the Ministry of Economics developed the 2014-20 Tourism Development Guidelines, a plan similar to that of neighbouring Estonia's National Tourism Development Plan (NTDP), and along with the Investment and Development Agency's Tourism Marketing Strategy 2018-23, aim to increase the knowledge of Latvia as a tourist destination and to run tourism in Latvia sustainably, and to better educate the Latvian service sector in tourism management.

== Infrastructure ==
=== Energy ===
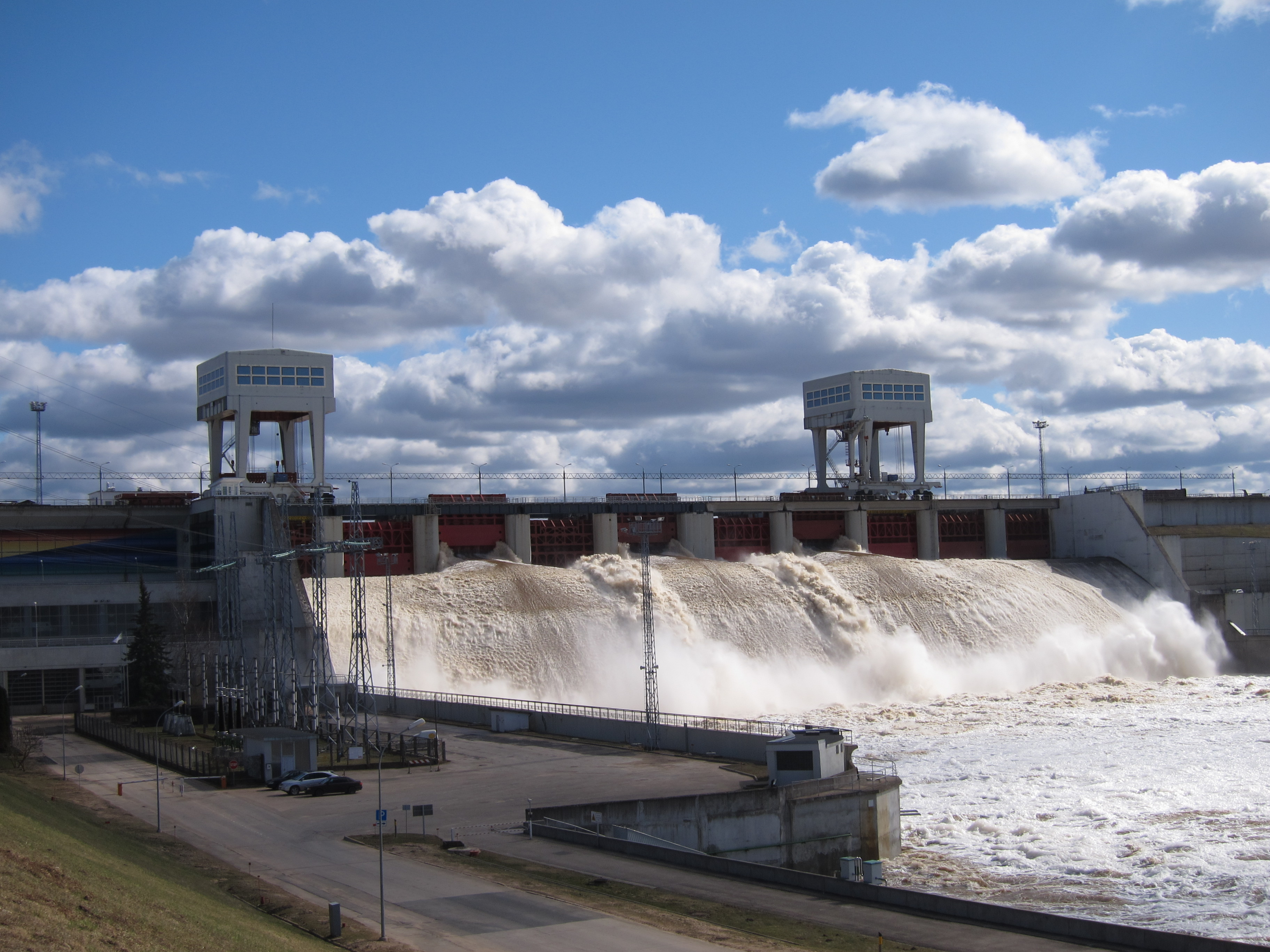
Pļaviņas Hydroelectric Power Station

Most of Latvian electricity is produced with Hydroelectricity. The largest hydroelectric power stations are Pļaviņas Hydroelectric Power Station, Riga Hydroelectric Power Plant and Ķegums Hydroelectric Power Station.

In 2017 about 4381 GWh were produced in hydro power and 150 GWh in wind power. There are plans to increase Wind electricity production under the 2021-2030 energy plan.

Latvia used to import 100% of its natural gas from Russia, until its import was banned in January 2023.

=== Transport ===
Key ports are located in Riga (Freeport of Riga and Riga Passenger Terminal), Ventspils (Free port of Ventspils), and Liepāja (Port of Liepāja). Most transit traffic uses these and half the cargo is crude oil and oil products.

Latvian Railways is the main state-owned railway company in Latvia. Its daughter companies both carry out passengers services as well as carry a large quantity of freight cargo, and freight trains operate over the whole current passenger network, and a number of lines currently closed to passenger services.

Riga International Airport is the only major airport in Latvia, carrying around 5 million passengers annually. It is the largest airport in the Baltic states and has direct flights to over 80 destinations in 30 countries. It is also the main hub of airBaltic.

=== Telecommunications ===
Telecommunications in Latvia encompass a broad range of services including the internet, telephones, television, and radio.

== International trade ==
Exports of Latvia by product category (2019) Chemical products Transportation Machines Mineral products Plastics and rubbers Metals Foodstuffs Precious metals Textiles Instruments Animal products Vegetable products Paper goods Footwear and headwear Miscellaneous Stone and glass Wood products Animal and vegetable bi-products Animal hides Arts and antiques Weapons

Latvia's principal merchandise exports in 2023 were telecommunications transmission equipment, sawn coniferous wood, wheat and meslin, packaged medicaments and natural gas. The country exported US$20.5 billion worth of goods, with Lithuania, Estonia, Germany, Sweden and Russia as its largest export markets.

Merchandise imports amounted to US$24.5 billion in 2023. The largest imported products were refined petroleum products, natural gas, telecommunications transmission equipment, packaged medicaments and electricity. Lithuania, Germany, Poland, Estonia and Finland were Latvia's largest import partners.

== Corporations ==
=== Most valuable companies ===
Largest Latvian companies by valuation (EUR € billions) according to Prudentia and Nasdaq Riga (2024).

Rank	Name	Headquarters	Valuation (bil. €)	Industry
1	Swedbank Baltics, AS	Riga	4.345 ▲	Banking
2	Latvenergo, AS	Riga	4.024 ▲	Energy
3	Latvijas valsts meži, AS	Riga	1.657 ▼	Forestry
4	Mikrotīkls, SIA	Riga	0.992 ▼	Network equipment
5	Maxima Latvija, SIA	Riga	0.816 ▲	Retail
7 ▲	SEB banka, AS	Valdlauči	0.590 ▲	Banking
8 ▼	Latvijas Mobilais Telefons, SIA	Riga	0.560 ▲	Telecommunications
9 ▲	Citadele Banka, AS	Riga	0.507 ▲	Banking
10	Rimi Latvia, SIA	Riga	0.499 ▲	Retail
11 ▲	Tele2, SIA	Riga	0.425 ▲	Telecommunications
12 ▼	Elko Grupa, AS	Riga	0.402 ▼	Wholesale of electronics

== See also ==
- Baltic Tiger
- Baltic states housing bubble
- Economy of Europe
