= Alex Potter =

Alex or Alexander Potter may refer to:

- Alex Potter, character in 3:10 to Yuma (1957 film)
- Alex Potter (actor) in Another Life (film)
- Alexander Potter (writer) for Sirius: The Dog Star

== See also ==
- Alexandra Potter, British author
