= Sustainable society =

The term sustainable society can refer to:

- An ecologically literate society.
- A society rooted in environmentalism, nonviolence, social justice, and grassroots, an aim of green politics.
- A society striving for sustainability.

== Related terms ==
- Sustainable city
- Sustainable design
- Sustainable Society Index
- Sustainable living
