= Sirius: The Dog Star =

- First edition
- Language: English
- Publication date: 2004

Sirius: The Dog Star is a 2004 anthology of science fiction/fantasy short-stories revolving around dogs. Edited by Martin H. Greenberg and Alexander Potter, it was published by DAW.

== Contents ==
Title	Author
"Finding Marcus"	antons
"Brothers Bound"	Julie E. Czerneda
"Heartsease"	Fiona Patton
"A Spaniel for the King"	India Edghill
"Among the Pack Alone"	Stephen Leigh
"After the Fall"	Kristine Kathryn Rusch
"Final Exam"	Rosemary Edghill
"Precious Cargo"	Bernie Arntzen
"Hair of the Dog"	Doranna Durgin
"All the Virtues"	Mickey Zucker Reichert
"Dog Gone"	John Zakour
"Life's a Bichon"	Bethlyn Damone
"Keep the Dog Hence"	Jane Lindskold
"Snow Spawn"	Nancy Springer
"Improper Congress"	Elaine Quon
"Huntbrother"	Michelle West
