= International rankings of Latvia =

These are the international rankings of Latvia.

Index	Rank	Countries reviewed
Democracy Index 2018	38th	167
Freedom in the World 2019	FREE	195
Reporters Without Borders World Press Freedom Index 2019	24th	180
Transparency International: Corruption Perceptions Index 2018	41st	180
Index of Public Integrity 2017	26th	109
Global Gender Gap Report Global Gender Gap Index 2018	17th	149
Human Development Index 2018	41st	189
World Happiness Report 2019	53rd	156
Euro health consumer index 2018	30th	35
Social Progress Index 2019	36th	149
Environmental Performance Index 2018	37th	180
Sustainable Society Index Human Wellbeing 2016	32nd	154
Sustainable Society Index Environmental Wellbeing 2016	89th	154
Sustainable Society Index Economic Wellbeing 2016	13th	154
Ease of doing business index 2019	19th	190
Index of Economic Freedom 2019	35th	180
Economic Freedom of the World 2017	24th	162
International Tax Competitiveness Index 2016	3rd	35
Logistics Performance Index 2018	70th	160
Global Innovation Index, WIPO, 2026	40	139
ICT Development Index 2017	35th	176
Speedtest Global Index August 2019 Mobile	43rd	145
Speedtest Global Index August 2019 Fixed Broadband	28th	176
Programme for International Student Assessment Maths 2015	34th	72
Programme for International Student Assessment Science 2015	31st	72
Programme for International Student Assessment Reading 2015	29th	72
EF English Proficiency Index 2015	22nd	70
Global Peace Index 2019	35th	163
Legatum Prosperity Index 2016	37th	149
Fragile States Index 2017	141st	178
