= 1995 Latvian banking crisis =

Economy of Latvia
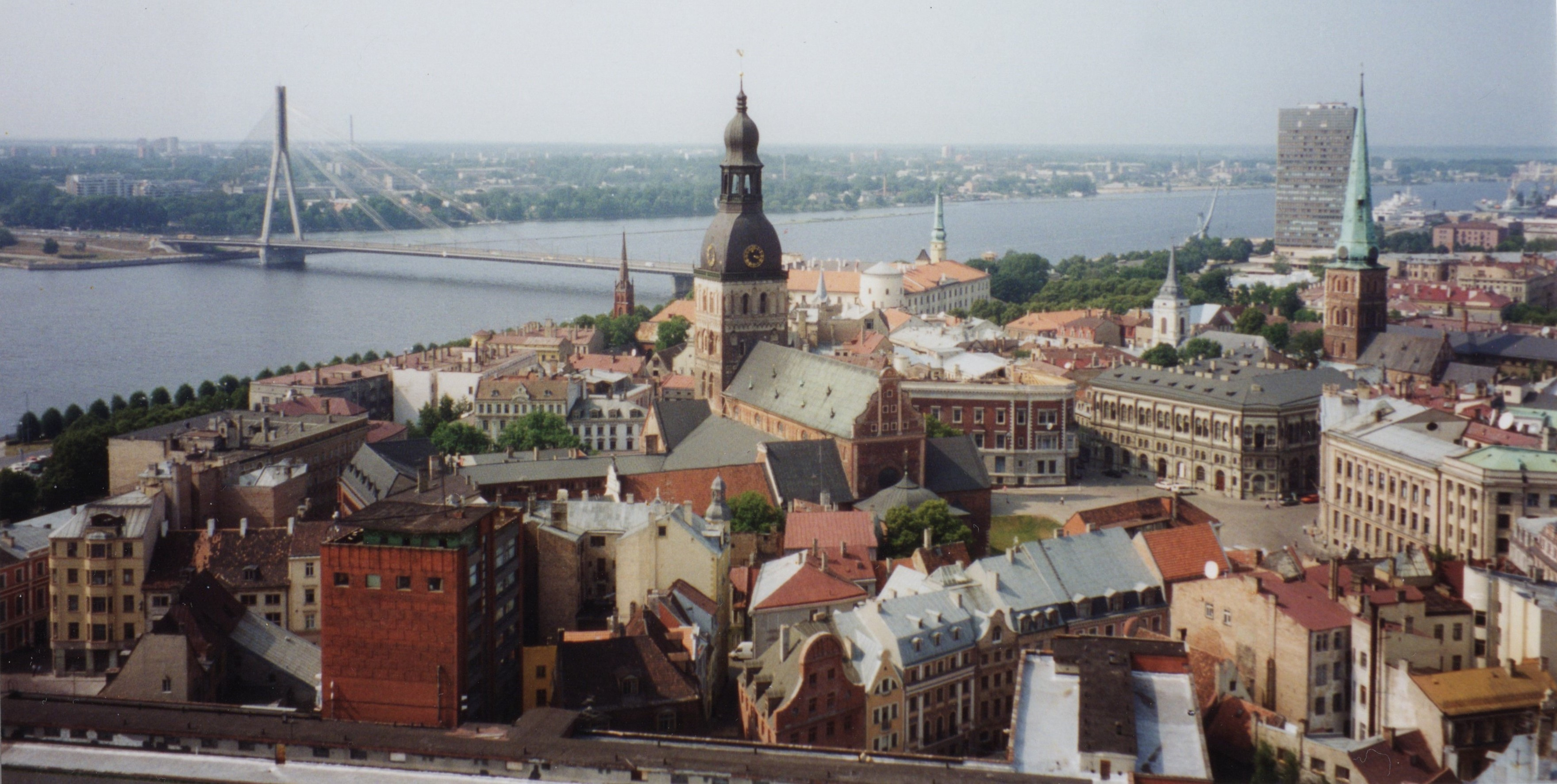
- Currency: Latvian lats (Ls)
- Fixed exchange rates: 1 SDR = 0.7997 Ls
- Fiscal year: 1995
- Trade organizations: Bank of Latvia, Ministry of Finance

Statistics
- Population: 2.5 million
- GDP: US$4.5 billion (1995)
- GDP growth: -0.8% (impacted by banking collapse)
- Inflation (CPI): 25.0% (1995)
- Base borrowing rate: 90% (Bank Baltija deposit rate)
- Main industries: Transit, Timber, Manufacturing (VEF, RAF - declining)

External
- Exports: US$1.3 billion
- Imports: US$1.8 billion

Public finance
- Government debt: 7% of GDP (cost of bank bailout)
- Budget balance: -US$200 million
- Revenue: Decreased due to enterprise tax arrears
- Credit rating: Standard & Poor's: (Inaugural rating pending)
- All values, unless otherwise stated, are in US dollars.

The 1995 Latvian banking crisis was a pivotal financial collapse in Latvia that resulted in the loss of approximately 40% of the banking system's total assets and liabilities. Occurring during the "wild nineties," it remains the most significant systemic failure in the post-Soviet states prior to the 1998 Russian financial crisis. The collapse was precipitated by the insolvency of Bank Baltija, the nation's largest commercial lender, and was characterized by massive fraud, insider lending, and the inherent instability of the early transition to market capitalism.

== Origins ==
Following the 1991 restoration of independence of Latvia, the government pursued aggressive market liberalization. By 1993, over 60 commercial banks were licensed, many of which operated as "pocket banks" for former Soviet enterprise managers. These institutions took advantage of high inflation and a lack of regulatory oversight to engage in high-risk trade finance and lending to shareholders.

The crisis began to manifest as the Bank of Latvia successfully stabilized the Latvian lats, causing inflation to drop from triple digits to 25%. This "shock therapy" exposed banks that could no longer hide non-performing loans behind inflated currency values.

== The fall of Bank Baltija ==
Bank Baltija, led by Aleksandrs Lavents, became the epicenter of the crisis. By early 1995, it held US$392 million in deposits—nearly 20% of the entire system.

=== Predatory Practices ===
The bank maintained liquidity by offering annual interest rates of 90% on lats deposits, attracting over 200,000 individual accounts. This forced a massive migration of capital away from the state-owned Savings Bank. In reality, the bank was insolvent by early 1995, using new deposits to pay previous interest in a Ponzi scheme fashion.

=== The Intertek Asset Strip ===
As auditors from Coopers & Lybrand moved in, Bank Baltija management attempted a final extraction of capital. They allegedly sold over US$160 million of the bank's loan portfolio to a Moscow-based "pocket bank" called Intertek in exchange for Russian government bonds that never materialized. By the time the bank was officially declared insolvent in July 1995, US$260 million in assets had been successfully "stripped" and moved offshore.

== Economic and political impact ==
The fallout was not localized to a single bank; other major institutions, including Latvian Deposit Bank and Olimpija Bank, also collapsed.

Real GDP growth, which had been recovering, dipped back into the negative (-0.8%) as 40% of the money supply was frozen. The state was forced to issue US$320 million in bonds to cover the deficit.

Thousands of retirees lost their life savings, leading to widespread social unrest and a "wild west" reputation for the country's financial sector.

Latvia experienced a sharp increase in unemployment, which reached 20 percent of the workforce after the banking crisis in 1995-1996.

The crisis directly influenced the 1995 Latvian parliamentary election, where voters punished the centrist "Latvian Way" party, leading to the rise of populist and nationalist factions.

== See also ==
- 2008 Latvian financial crisis
- Economy of Latvia
- History of Latvia
