= New Russians =

Rich business class in post-Soviet Russia

The New Russians (Russian: новые русские, romanized: novye russkie) is a term referring to members of a newly rich social class in the Commonwealth of Independent States who made vast fortunes in the 1990s (also referred to as "the wild nineties") in Russia following the collapse of the Soviet Union. It is perceived as a stereotypical caricature. According to the stereotype, "New Russians" achieved rapid wealth by using criminal methods during Russia's chaotic transition to a market economy.

In the 1990s, "New Russians" became a staple of jokes that played on stereotypes about businessmen.

== History ==
The exact time and place, as well as the authorship of this expression, have not been fully established.

Some suggest that the expression "Новый Русский" (Russian tr. novyi russkii lit. "New Russian") arose in the Russian-speaking sphere in the ostensibly English-language form "New Russian", and after that calqued into the Russian-language form. Another theory suggests the term appeared in foreign press and then made its way into Russia. Supporters of the latter theory suggest that the author of the expression was the American journalist Hedrick Smith who published two books about Russia: "The Russians" (1976) and "The New Russians" (1990).

Another theory posits that "New Russian" is more of a pun, playing on the French term "nouveau riche" (i.e. "new rich"), whose meaning is very close to the term "New Russian".

In the documentary film With a hard-sign on the end (С твёрдом знаком на конце), dedicated to the 20th anniversary of the creation of the newspaper Kommersant and shown on Channel One on 30 November 2009), author Leonid Parfyonov demonstrates a copy of Kommersant from 1992 in which an editorial letter was addressed to the "New Russians". Parfyonov confirms that the newspaper first introduced this word into daily life, and initially it did not have any negative or ironic connotation, merely serving to describe the representatives of Russia's growing business class.

In 2010, chief researcher at the Institute of Sociology of the Russian Academy of Sciences, Renald Simonyan noted that the “New Russians” were the product of the reforms of the 1990s, giving them the following characteristics: “Physically strong, poorly educated, assertive, devoid of moral values, and materialistic types”.

Valeria Buryakovskaya, in her monograph Communicative Characteristics of Mass Culture in Media Discourse (2014), noted that the term New Russians was gradually falling out of use and fading into history. By the 2010s, it was mainly referenced as a retro-term from "the wild nineties" era.

== See also ==
- Russian oligarch
- The wild nineties
- NEPman
- New Soviet man
- Novus homo
- Russian Mafia
- Oligarchy
- Gopnik
- Nouveau riche
- Thief in law
- Nawab
