= Antons =

Male given name and family name

- Gender: Male
- Name day: 18 January

Origin
- Region of origin: Latvia, Lithuania

Other names
- Related names: Anton

Antons is a Danish, Latvian and Swedish masculine given name that is a short form of Antonius in use in Denmark, Greenland, Sweden, and Latvia. It is also a surname. People with the name Antons include:

== Given name ==
- Antons Jemeļins (born 1984), Latvian footballer
- Antons Justs (1931–2019), Latvian Roman Catholic bishop
- Antons Kurakins (born 1990), Latvian footballer
- Antons Sapriko (born 1980), Latvian businessman

== Surname ==
- Mārtiņš Antons (1888–1941), Latvian lawyer and politician
