= The wild nineties =

Idiom describing the 1990s in Russia

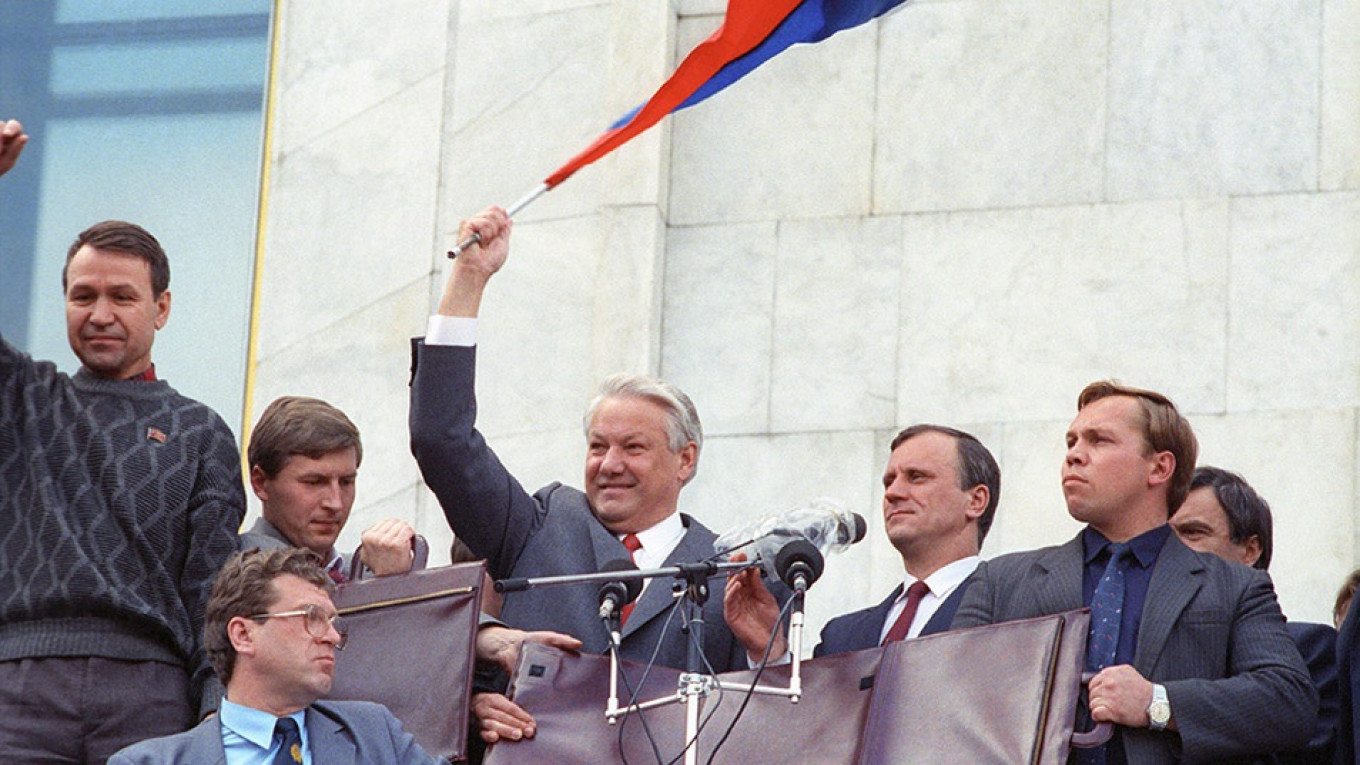
Boris Yeltsin, President of Russia from 1991 to 1999, on the podium after the defeat of the State Emergency Committee coup

The wild nineties (Russian: лихие девяностые, romanized: likhiye devyanostyye) is a term with a negative evaluative connotation referring to the decade following the collapse of the Soviet Union and the formation of the Russian Federation in the 1990s. It denotes a period of profound political, economic, and social transformation, characterized by widespread social instability associated with the transition to a new political and economic system.

The period is typically associated with the rapid shift from a command economy to market capitalism, marked by a breakdown of central authority, the rise of organized crime in Russia, and a significant decline in living standards. Following the dissolution of the Soviet Union in 1991, Russia entered a period of transition characterized by significant political, economic, and social instability. While the term is primarily applied to Russia, it is also used more broadly to describe the political and social upheavals experienced across the post-Soviet states following the collapse of the Soviet Union.

== Usage ==
The term "wild nineties" was likely coined by writer Mikhail Veller, who used the expression in his 2002 novel Cassandra. But its widespread use began earlier in the 1990s through Russian media, films, and literature that depicted the decade’s chaos, criminality, and bespredel (a term for lawless excess).

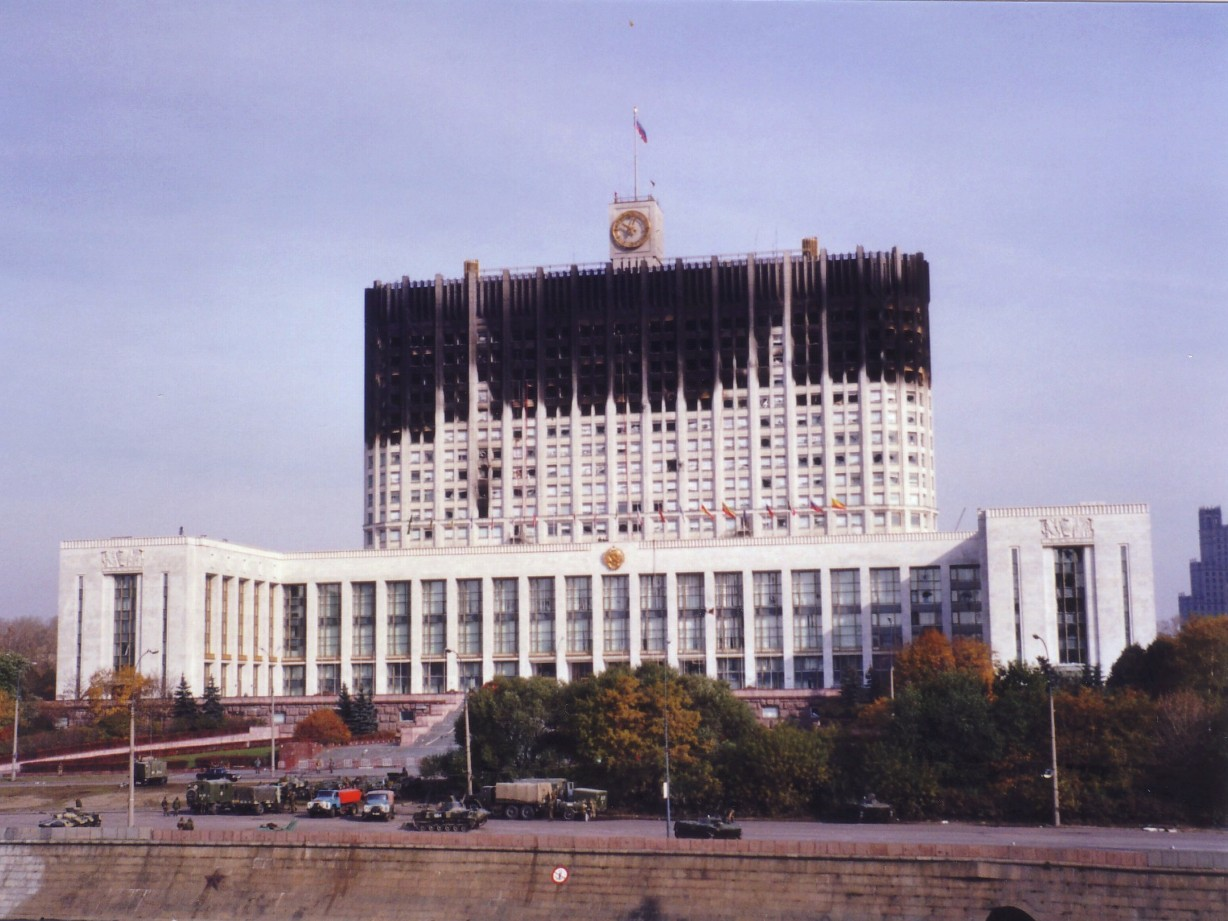
The burnt-out Russian Government House after it was shelled during the 1993 Russian constitutional crisis

The phrase “Wild Nineties” is commonly used to describe the turbulent transformation of Russia’s political and economic systems during the early years of the Russian Federation.

Key events of the period include the August Coup, the collapse of the Soviet Union, the reforms of Yeltsin's government under Gaidar, privatization of state assets into private hands, price liberalization, devaluation of citizens' savings, unpaid wages, pensions, and social benefits, the constitutional crisis that ended in the violent dispersal of the Congress of People's Deputies and the Supreme Soviet, the Ossetian-Ingush armed conflict of 1992, the 1993 currency reform, the rise of terrorism and organized crime, two Chechen wars, the 1998 Russian financial crisis, westernization, sexual revolution, moral relativism, a sharp decline in birth rates, and increased mortality during peacetime, etc.

During this period, the planned economy was replaced by what Marshall Poe described as a "chaotic mix of banditry and capitalism," while the armed forces lost their former power. During the 1990s, Russia experienced rapid economic reforms and significant changes to its political institutions. According to Anastasia Bonch-Osmolovskaya, only those who experienced post-Soviet collective memory can truly understand the meaning of the term "wild nineties."

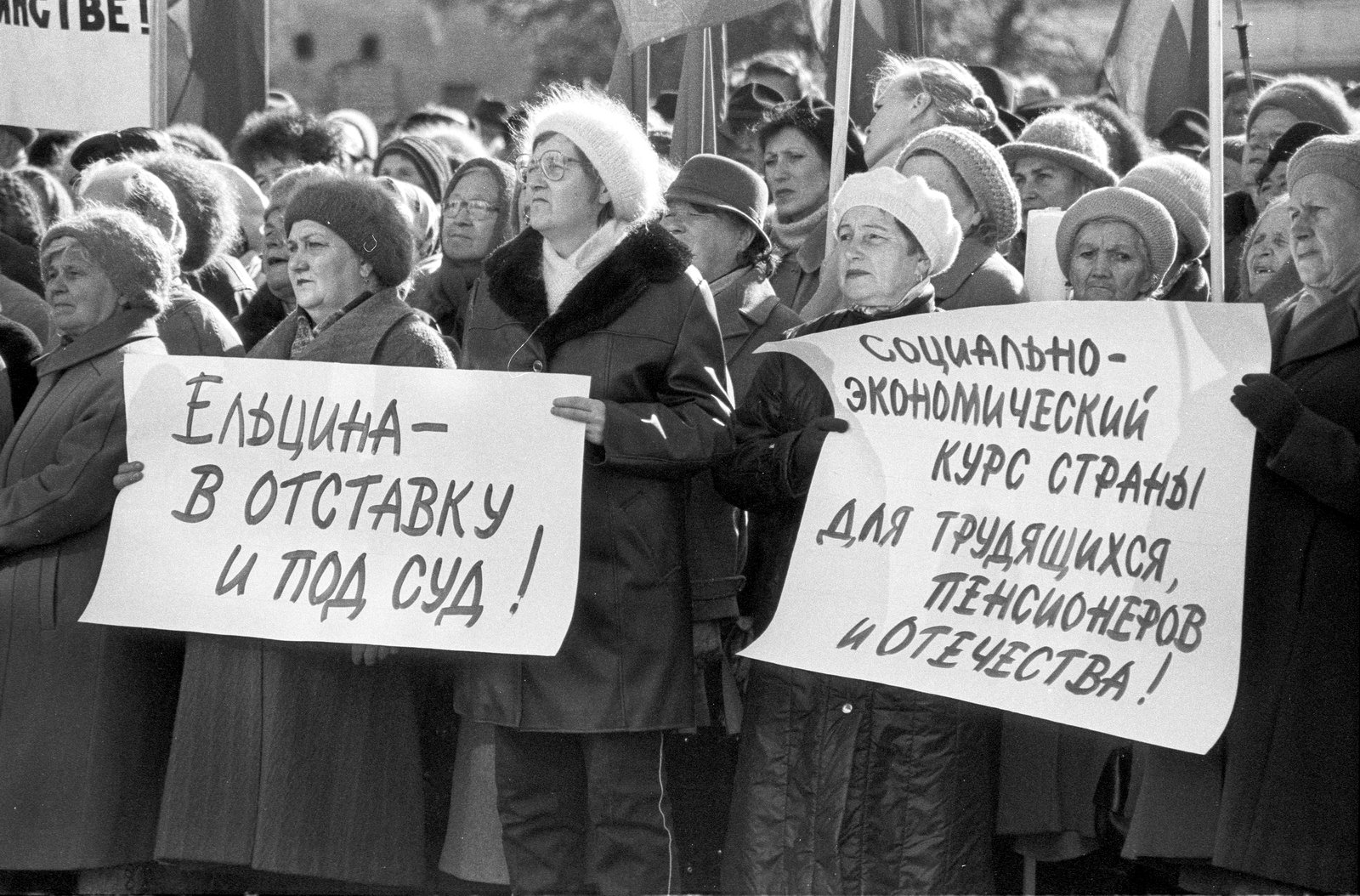
Pensioners at a rally as part of the All-Russian trade union action "No to destructive economic reforms" in Pereslavl-Zalessky, October 7, 1998

From the mid-2000s, the expression began to be used by the press, replacing more emotionally charged terms for that decade, such as "bloody," "disastrous," "bad," etc.

According to BBC Russia correspondent Olga Slobodchikova, the phrase gained popularity during the 2007 Russian legislative election campaign.

Russian politicians and journalists often contrast the "wild nineties" with the term "stable noughties," which emerged from President Vladimir Putin's repeated statements about stability as the new course of Russian state policy.

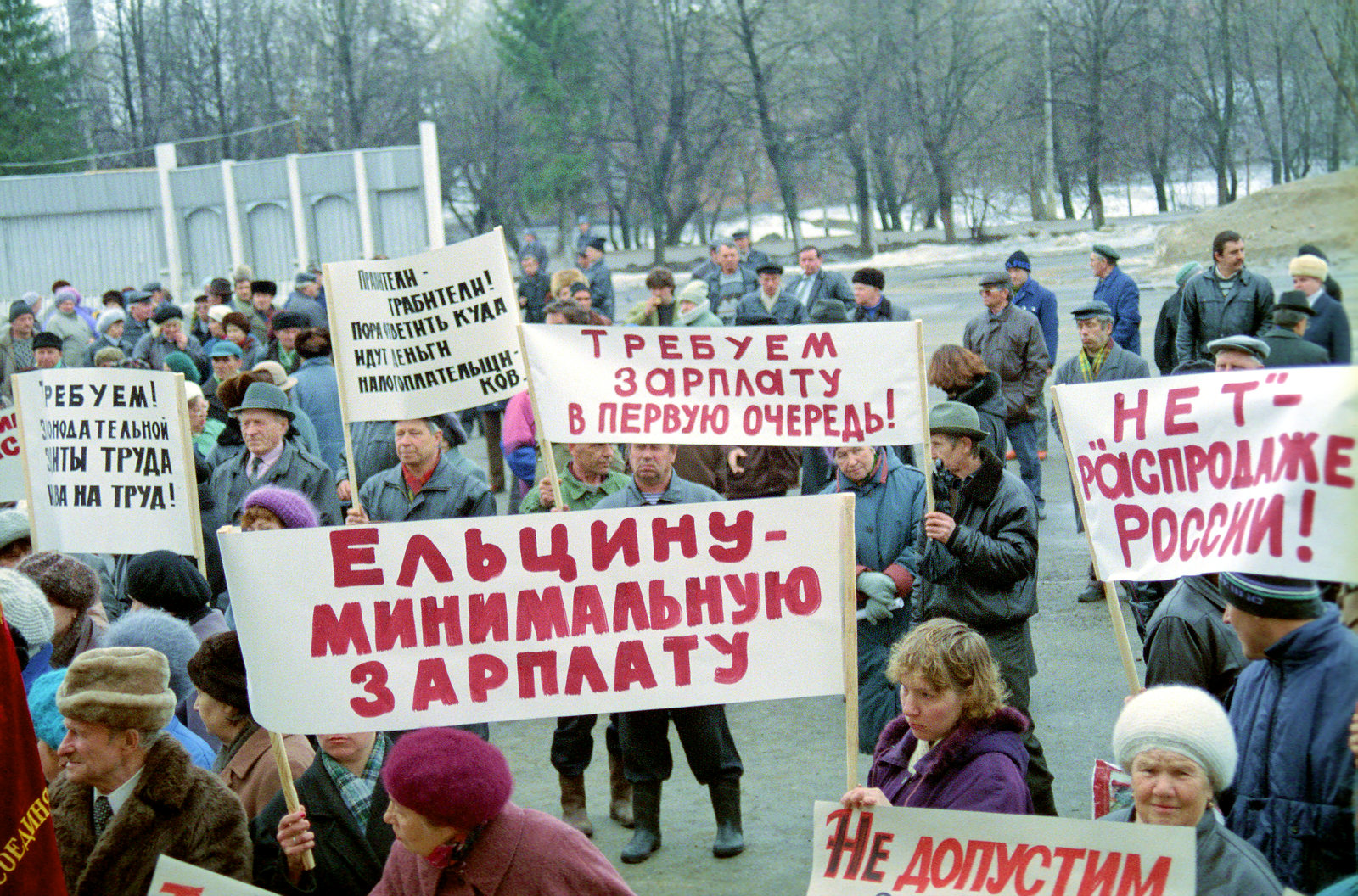
Rally as part of the All-Russian Trade Union Action "For Full Payment of Wages" in Pereslavl-Zalessky, April 9, 1998

The events of the 1990s negatively affected inhabitants of the CIS countries and Russians' attitudes toward European values and the concept of democracy. A 2009 all-Russian survey by the Institute of Sociology of the Russian Academy of Sciences revealed that the overwhelming majority associated the word "democracy" with theft, corruption, and national humiliation, with only 10.4% of respondents viewing the concept positively. By the late 1990s, this emotional rejection of liberal values created the groundwork for a return to an authoritarian regime.

== Signs of the era ==
The major articles on the economy in Russia during the 1990s, the devaluation of citizens' savings (1990-1992), and the demographic crisis in Russia are noted. According to Professor Utsa Patnaik, the demographic catastrophe in Russia in the early 1990s was met with a grim silence from the Western academic community. The "shock therapy" aimed at transitioning to capitalism, as advised by Western experts, led to a catastrophic fall in GDP in former socialist countries between 1990 and 1996. In Russia and Ukraine, GDP by 1996 was half or less than it was a decade earlier, and in Georgia, which suffered the most, GDP dropped to one-fifth of its mid-1980s level. Patnaik argues that this process caused the catastrophe but received neither international recognition nor attention.

The consequences for the population reversed decades of continuous improvement in human development indicators. Mortality rates among working-age people rose from 49 to 58 per 1,000 in 1992 compared to 1990, and by 1994 reached 84 per 1,000. Life expectancy for men decreased by almost six years. The overall population of Russia showed an absolute decline, an unprecedented situation in peacetime.

Simply by taking the 1990 mortality rate in Russia as a baseline and calculating the accumulated excess deaths by 1996, it is estimated that over 4 million excess deaths occurred in Russia.

== Outside of Russia ==
The term "wild nineties," while most commonly associated with Russia’s post-Soviet experience, also resonates in other former Soviet republics that underwent similar transitions during the decade. Following the dissolution of the Soviet Union in 1991, these newly independent states faced their own versions of economic collapse, political turmoil, and social transformation, often characterized by hyperinflation, privatization scandals, and the rise of oligarchic elites. The extent and nature of these "wild" conditions varied across the region, shaped by local histories, resources, and geopolitical contexts.

=== Czech Republic ===
In Eastern Bloc countries like the Czech Republic (Czech: "Divoká 90. léta"), the transition was relatively smooth compared to post-Soviet states, earning the nickname "Velvet Revolution" for its peaceful end to communist rule. However, the 1990s brought challenges with the "Velvet Divorce"—the peaceful dissolution of Czechoslovakia into the Czech Republic and Slovakia on January 1, 1993. Economic reforms under Václav Klaus embraced shock therapy, rapidly privatizing state enterprises. While this spurred growth, it also led to unemployment, banking scandals, and "tunneling" (asset-stripping by insiders).

=== Poland ===
Poland, the first Eastern Bloc country to overthrow communism via Solidarity’s electoral victory in 1989, embraced aggressive market reforms under Finance Minister Leszek Balcerowicz. The "Balcerowicz Plan" slashed subsidies and liberalized prices, triggering inflation and unemployment but laying the groundwork for later growth. The early 1990s saw a proliferation of small businesses, a "wild west" atmosphere of unregulated trade, and social discontent as Poles adjusted to capitalism.

=== Ukraine ===
In Ukraine, the 1990s were marked by severe economic decline and corruption. The rapid shift to a market economy led to hyperinflation peaking at 10,000% in 1993, wiping out savings and impoverishing much of the population. Privatization efforts, intended to dismantle the Soviet command economy, instead enabled a small group of insiders to amass wealth, a phenomenon mirrored in Russia where state assets were often sold at low prices to politically connected individuals, creating a class of oligarchs, which paralleled Russia’s "loans-for-shares" schemes.

=== Slovakia ===
Slovakia under Vladimír Mečiar's leadership (1993–1998), saw slower economic reform, political authoritarianism, and international isolation. Privatization favored Mečiar’s allies, fostering corruption and cronyism, while unemployment soared in industrial regions. The "wild nineties" (“Divoké 90.roky”) in Slovakia reflected a struggle to define national identity and catch up to its more prosperous Czech neighbor, with stability only emerging after Mečiar’s ouster in 1998.

=== Latvia ===
In Latvia, the "wild nineties" (Latvian: mežonīgie deviņdesmitie) were defined by the radical "shock therapy" required to dismantle the Soviet command economy and restore national sovereignty. Following the 1991 restoration of independence, Latvia faced the collapse of industrial giants like VEF and Riga Autobus Factory (RAF), leading to mass unemployment and the rise of powerful "racket" groups that exploited the legal vacuum of early privatization. Despite the chaos of hyperinflation and the 1995 banking crisis, the era saw pivotal milestones including the introduction of the Latvian lats, the total withdrawal of Russian troops in 1994, and the first decisive steps toward EU and NATO integration.

== In culture ==
- In 2007, the Russian NTV channel aired a program "The Wild Nineties" (Лихие 90-е) hosted by Anastasia Melnikova.
- The rethinking of the 1990s by the generation of the 2000s was shown by Russian singer Monetochka in her album Adult Coloring Books. The song "90" mocks stereotypes about the "wild nineties," which are perpetuated even by those born after the 1990s and who did not experience that time.
- In 2024, the Russian Anti-Corruption Foundation released a series of web documentaries called The Traitors about this period of history.

== See also ==
- New Russians
- 1990s United States boom
- Swinging Sixties
