= Ave Line =

Company based in Riga, Latvia

- Founded: 2000
- Headquarters: Riga, Latvia
- Area served: Germany, Latvia
- Services: Passenger transportation, Freight transportation
- Website: www.ave.lv

Ave Line is a Latvian shipping company that operates ferry services between Lübeck-Travemünde, Germany, and Riga, Latvia.

== History ==
Ave Line was founded in 2000 and launched its first ferry service between Travemünde and Liepāja on November 21, 2008.

The company initially operated with the chartered vessel Ave Liepaja (formerly Brave Merchant). At the end of 2008, a second ship, Ave Luebeck (formerly Dawn Merchant), was also chartered. However, before the Ave Luebeck reached the Baltic Sea, the charter was canceled.

Following the expiration of the Ave Liepaja charter at the end of 2009, service was temporarily suspended for about four months. In April 2010, Ave Line introduced the Baltic Amber (formerly Borja) as the successor to Ave Liepaja. After Scandlines took over the Travemünde–Liepāja route, Ave Line shifted operations to the Latvian port of Ventspils before eventually moving its service to Riga.

== Ferries ==
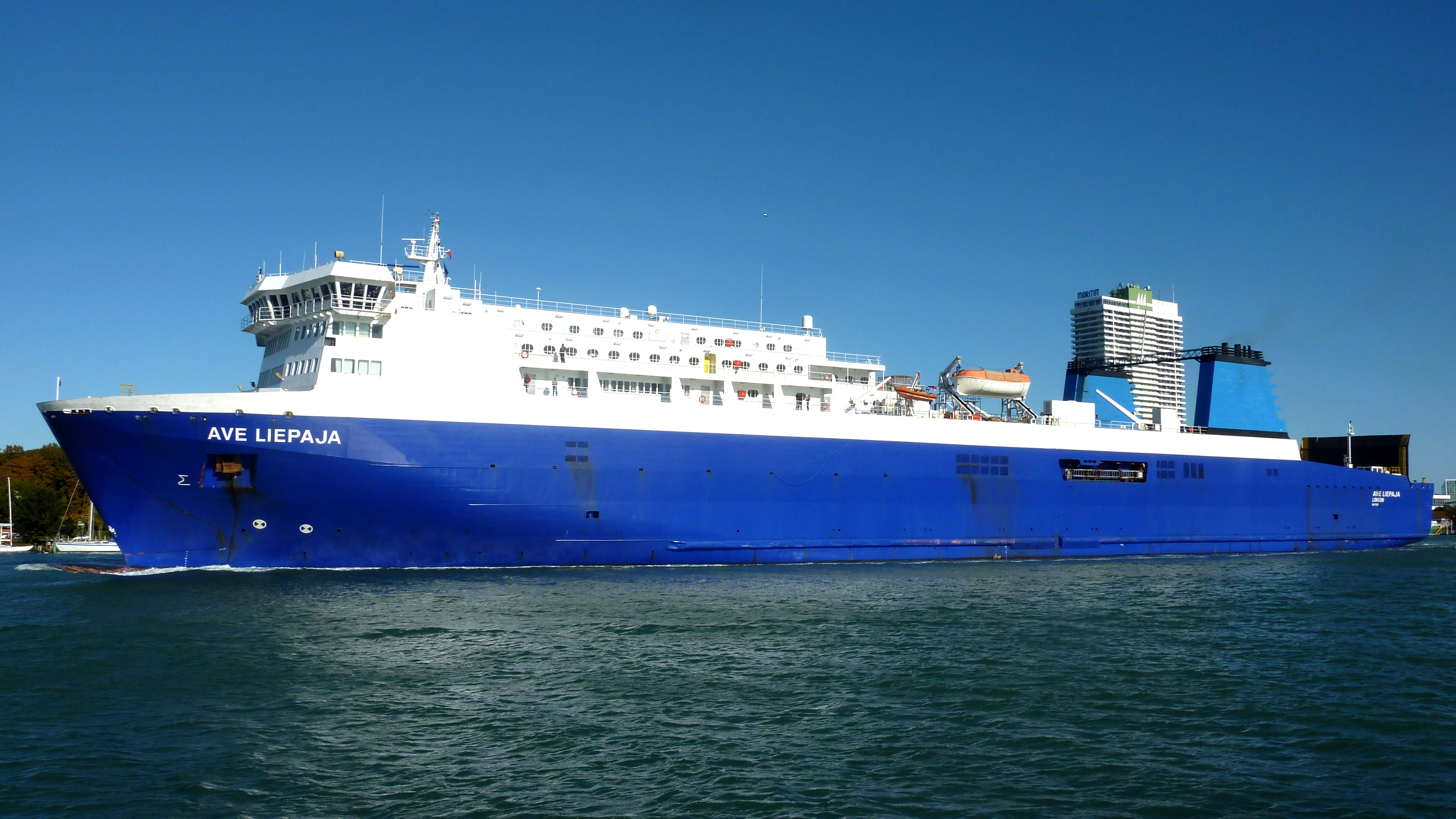
M/S Ave Liepaja in Travemünde (2009)

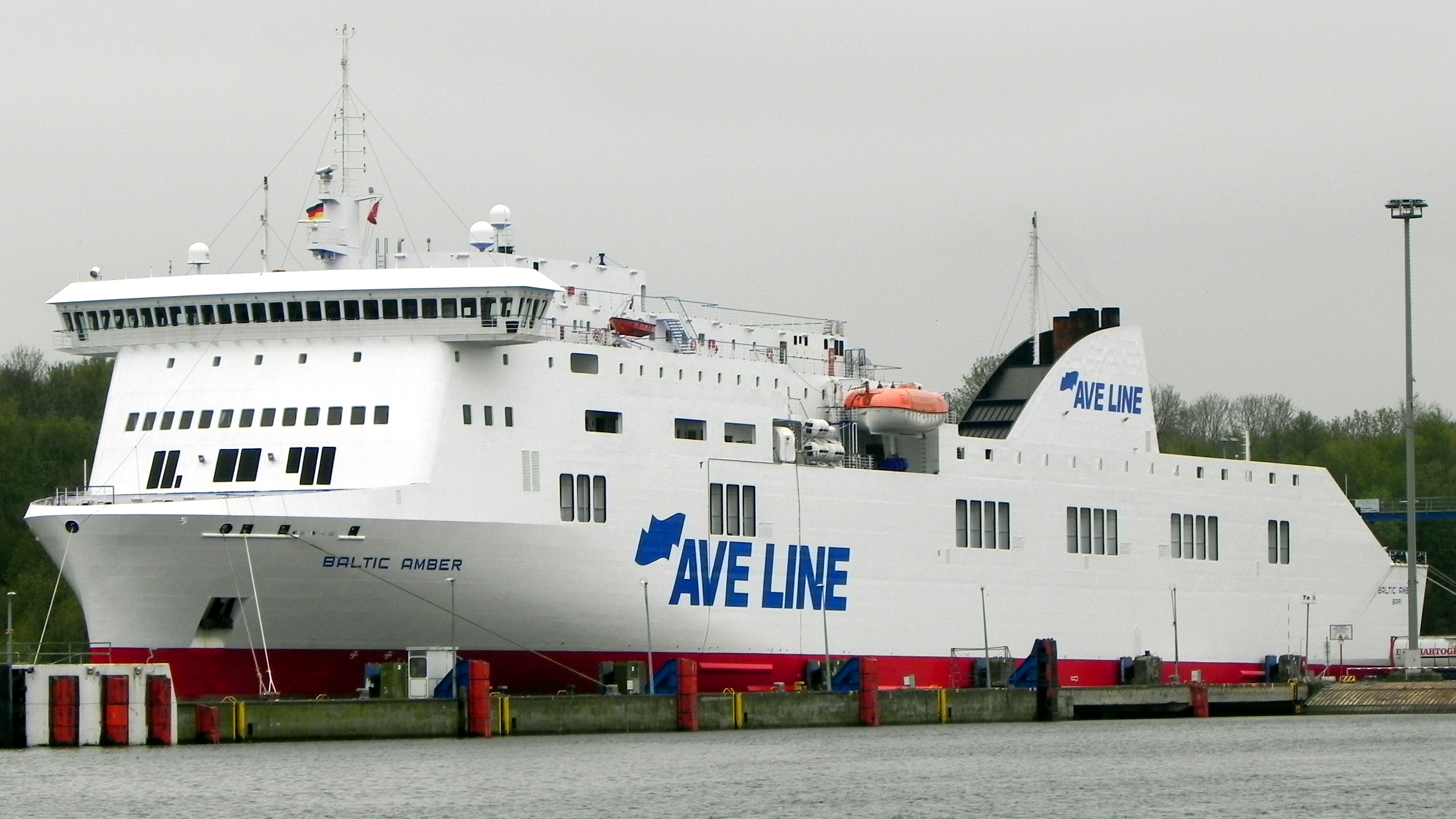
M/S Baltic Amber in Travemünde (2010)

=== Ave Liepaja (2008–2009) ===
Built in 1999 as Brave Merchant for Merchant Ferries in Seville, Spain. From 2006 to 2008, the vessel was chartered by Iscomar for service between Palma, Majorca, and Barcelona, and was renamed Blanca del Mar. In November 2008, it was chartered by Ave Line and renamed Ave Liepaja for use on the Travemünde–Liepāja route. Since March 2010, it has operated for LD Lines between Boulogne-sur-Mer and Dover under the name Norman Bridge. Built 1999 as Brave Merchant, for Merchant Ferries, in Seville, Spain. From 2006 to 2008 chartered for use between Palma, Majorca and Barcelona by Iscomar and renamed Blanca del Mar. In November 2008, chartered by Ave Line and renamed Ave Liepaja for service between Travemünde and Liepaja. Since March 2010 it is on duty for LD Lines between Boulogne-sur-Mer and Dover, and was renamed the Norman Bridge.

=== Ave Luebeck (2008–2009) ===
Built in 1998 as a sister ship of the Ave Liepaja as Dawn Merchant. First renamed in 2005 in Europax Appia, before it was chartered in 2006 by Baleària and renamed Pau Casals to run between Valencia, Spain and Palma, Majorca. Since April 2009 the by then renamed ship T-Rex operates between Genoa and Termini Imerese for T-Link Lines.

=== Baltic Amber (since 2010) ===
The Baltic Amber was built in 2007 for Balearia as Borja in Porto Viro, Italy. It operated on the route Barcelona - Palma. In March 2010 it was chartered by Ave Line and renamed Baltic Amber.
