= Sereal =

Company based in Riga, Latvia

SEREAL Ltd.
- Company type: Private Ltd.
- Industry: collectibles
- Founded: Riga, Latvia (2011)
- Founder: Ugis Purvins (founder)
- Headquarters: Silakrogs, Latvia
- Area served: Worldwide
- Key people: Ugis Purvins (President)
- Products: trading cards, stickers
- Website: Sereal official website

SEREAL Ltd. is trading cards and stickers manufacturer based in Silakrogs, Latvia with headquarters located in Riga, Latvia. It is best known for being the official producer of trading cards and stickers for Kontinental Hockey League.

The company under its subsidiary name SEREAL Basket is also the official trading card producer of Lithuanian Basketball League.

== SEREAL and KHL ==
Company SEREAL has begun its third cooperation year with Kontinental Hockey League, by producing trading cards and stickers. In the first year (season 2010/2011) of cooperation with Kontinental Hockey League, the company was working under the name of RDFK.

== SEREAL Basket ==
In 2012 the company started its cooperation with Lithuanian Basketball League and Lithuanian national basketball team by becoming the official producers of trading card. „LKL Basketball cards 2011/2012” was the first official collection released. The front of the package features three popular Lithuanian basketball players - Jonas Valančiūnas, Mantas Kalnietis and Mindaugas Zukauskas.

== SEREAL In North America ==
In 2011 SEREAL and ALL WORLD SPORTS COLLECTIBLES, LLC became business partners in the marketing and sale of Kontinental Hockey League trading cards and stickers in North America. ALL WORLD is the official SEREAL production distributor in the United States and Canada. ALL WORLD has a history of marketing of European hockey cards in the United States and Canada, which includes the first cards issued of Alexander Ovechkin and other biggest European hockey stars. ALL WORLD has established a website that is dedicated to the sale and marketing of SEREAL Kontinental Hockey League products.
