= Ogres Knitwear =

Company based in Latvia

- Industry: Textiles
- Headquarters: Ogre, Latvia

Ogre Knitwear was one of the leading manufacturers of knitwear in Europe. It had 390 employees. Turnover for 2011 was $15,093,775. It is based in Latvia

== History ==
The construction of the Ogres Knitwear factory began in 1965. The decision to go forward with such a project was made by the United Counsel of Peoples Economy on 30 May 1964, and by the committee of Building and the Architectural committee of the ministry on 20 June 1964. From March 1965 until October 1968, the company bore the name of Ogres Knitwear factory. By the decision of the cabinet of ministers of Latvias SSR from 23 October 1968, and by the order of the ministry of light industry of Latvias SSR from 5 November 1968, Ogres Knitwear factory was renamed as Ogres Knitwear Factory of 50th anniversary of All-Union Leninist Young Communist League. The construction of the factory lasted five years. The funds spent on the project totalled 40 million rubles(US$1 – 1 Rub : 1–0,9000). The investment was recovered in 3,5 years. The factory possessed spinning mill and sowing equipment which was made in Italy, as well as knitting equipment from the United Kingdom. The completion of the factory was broken down into stages. The first stage of the spinning mill was completed on 28 February 1968, the second stage followed on 30 September 1969. On 30 July 1970, all stages of the project were completed. The main form of activities of the factory were determined to be spinning pure wool and half wool yarn mix, knitting fabrics, and manufacturing of knitted garments.

Slowly, the structure of the company began to take form. In 1965 there were four structural units (accounting, building, HR, equipment specialists), but in 1971 there were already 29 structural units. During those times, the factory was building momentum and adding new work force. The training of young employees took place in a professional technical institute in the city. The acceptance of the graduates was in a form of a special ceremony.

Later, during the work years, there were many motivation programs in place. There were professional contests. The winners received diplomas and other awards. In the summer, there was a festival where workers showed off their skills. From 1972, the company began publishing its own newspaper, Ausam. It was published every week in Russian and Latvian. The publication contained information about best performing workers and social news. Development continued in the 1980s – in 1981 a branch plant in Preiļi was built and put into operation. It was responsible for sewing knitwear garments. In the mid-80s the company again underwent a name change – by the decision of the Council of Ministers of the Latvian SSR, 12 October 1985, it was renamed Ogre spinning and knitting union. The company worked under this title for the next 5 years. On 8 August 1990 the consortium of Light Industry "Latlegprom" on Presidium meeting endorsed the working unions request to rename the company – Enterprise Production Association "Ogre." On 10 June 1991 State Production Enterprise "Ogre" was registered in the Register of Enterprises of the Republic of Latvia. In the early 1990s there was a partial reconstruction of the spinning factory and an introduction of a new processing of wool fibers, using "Superwash" equipment. Wool which undergoes such processing is softer and wears longer. At the same time, the International Wool Secretariat presented the company with the right to bear the "Woolmark". In 1992, the company produced 3500 tons of yarn and 5 million units of knitwear. Yarn was mainly used for the operation of the enterprise, as well as being supplied to other companies in Latvia, Lithuania and Estonia, in turn, the knitwear produced was sold in Latvia and abroad – in Germany, Sweden, Finland. The changing socio economic structure of the state affected the factory. It transformed from a state-owned factory to a private company. In 1997 it belonged to the holding company "Baltin Holdnig" and from 2004 continues its successful development within the holding company "Mono."

On 1st of April 2016 Ogres Knitwear was liquidated.

== Retail Stores ==
In 2003 the company had started the development of a network of its own retail shops in the premium segment of the knitwear market.

== Sources ==
- Ogres Knitwear Company Archives
- Materials from the Museum of History and Art, Ogre
