= Just5 =

Companies based in Riga, Latvia

- Company type: Trademark, brand
- Industry: Mobile phones, feature phones
- Founded: 2008/2009
- Headquarters: Riga, Latvia
- Key people: Michael Nikolaev (CEO)
- Owner: SIA Orbita Telecom
- Website: just5.com

Just5 is an international mobile phone designer and developer headquartered in Riga, Latvia. The development of Just5 mobile phones started in 2008 and the trademark was acquired on October 5, 2009. The brand has been inactive since 2018.

== History ==
Just5 mobile phones are developed in cooperation with the design-bureau Newplan which is based in Beijing and Shenzhen and a joint company Just5-Newplan was created in 2009. Just5 mobile phones are manufactured by ODMs in Taiwan and are based on Infineon and MediaTek hardware platforms.

Just5 started sales in Europe in the first quarter of 2009 and the devices appeared in the markets of Russia and US in the third quarter of 2009. As of September 2010, Just5 mobile phones were being sold in 33 countries worldwide. In 11 of those countries, the devices were sold as rebranded under a local operator's brand.

The Just5 brand received the grand-prix award in the category "New Name" (new product or service) for 2009 at the BEST BRAND/EFFIE RUSSIA and the mobile phone "with big buttons", Just5 CP10, was awarded the iF Product Design Gold Award in 2010.

In October 2014, a new model Spacer released on December 2, released its improved version of Spacer 2s. A smartphone Blaster was released in February 2015. It has MediaTek MT6732 64 -bit processor with four cores and Android 4.4.4 Kitkat operating system.

Since the end of 2018, new brand products in the public sphere and the company's social network accounts can no longer be found. In December 2021, Orbit Telecom was charged 3465.84 EUR tax debt. On 2 September 2022, Orbit Telecom was removed from Latvia's tax registry.

== Logo ==
The Just5 logo represents an inkblot consisting of five connected circles that are all colored bright orange, except being colored silver in the US.

The five points and also the digit five in brand refer to the key qualities of the brand:

- Unique original design;
- Big buttons;
- Simplified menu;
- High quality assembling;
- Reliability.

== Products ==
=== Just5 CP ===
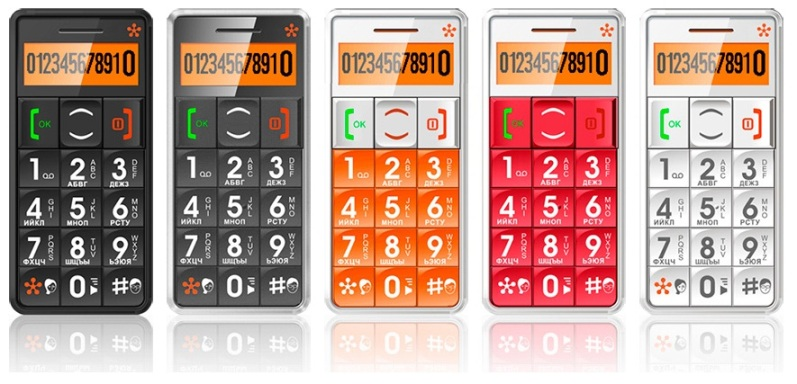
Just5 CP09

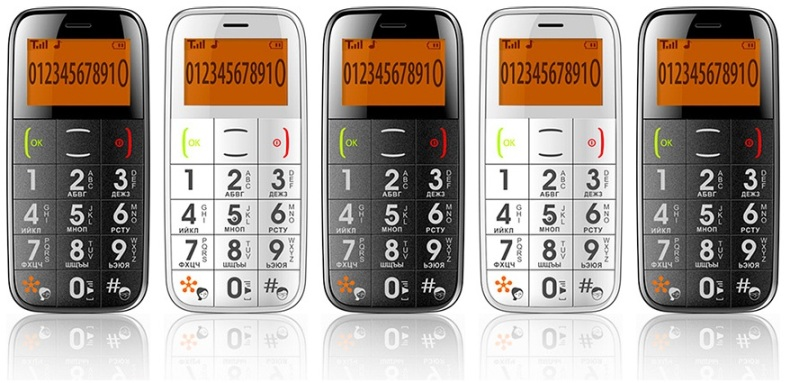
Just5 CP10

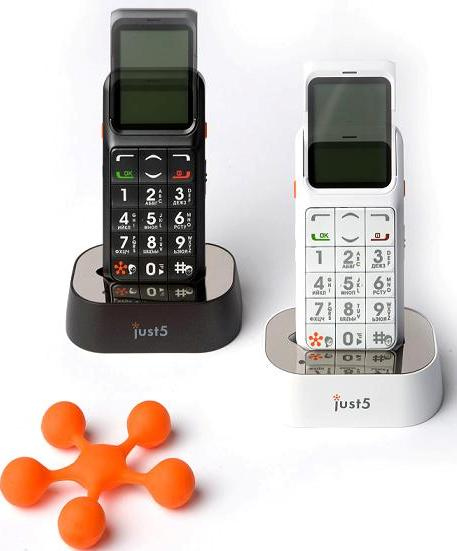
Just5 CP11

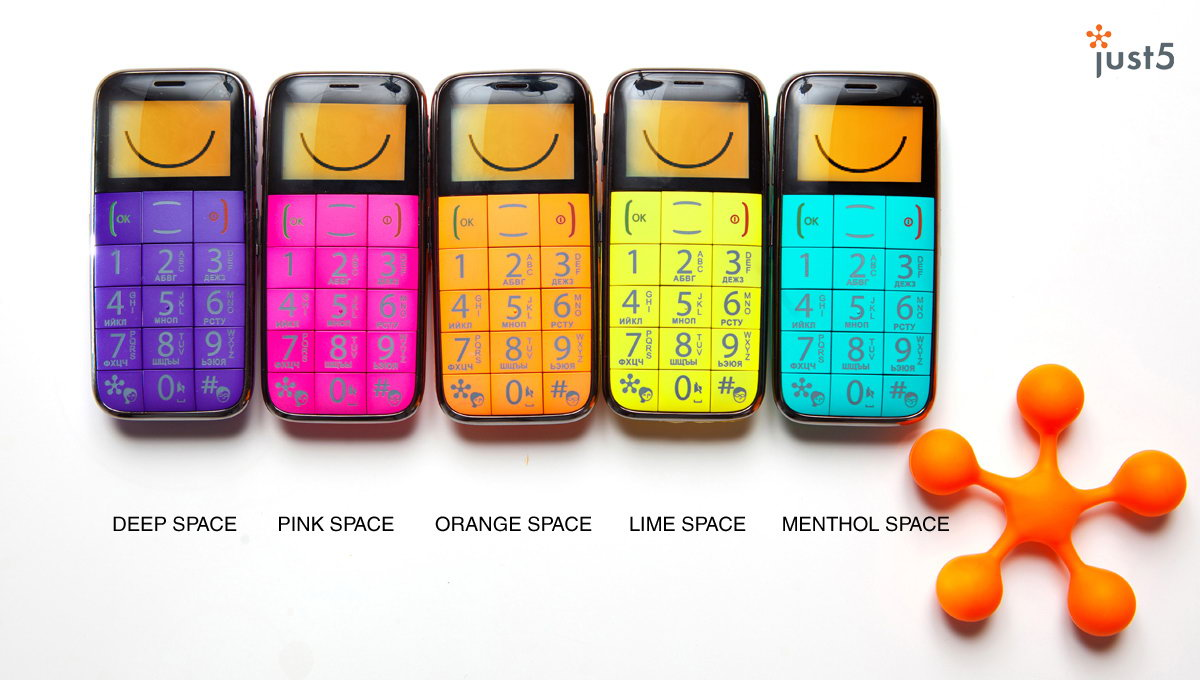
Just5 Space

In October 2010, two mobile phone models were released - the Just5 CP09 and the Just5 CP10 - which were the initial iterations of their simplified mobile phones aimed at seniors. The two models had differences in the specifications, but both followed the same idea of ease of use.

In December 2010, the Just5 CP11 was released and housed a 2.4" pop-up screen where when the screen was closed, only a third of it could be seen. It was designed with white and black metallic cases offering both glossy and "soft touch" finishes and also provides a charging dock.

In March 2013, the Just5 CP10S was released by Just5. The device is an iteration of the previously released CP10 having similar functionality to it and adding such variations as multiple color schemes instead of the black and white models which were the only choices available previously for the CP10. One of the color schemes was called BestInSpace and released as a limited edition as Just5 had cooperated with the sound designers from BestInSpace for the project.

=== Just5 Brick ===
In July 2013, the Just5 Brick, a mobile phone model that follows the same mindset of having simple features, was released. It is designed with the appearance of a brick - bulky, with squared corners, sturdy. The phone uses a simplified UI and houses a 1.77" LCD screen and large buttons. It is also available in multiple color palettes, including Just5 Brick Red.

=== Just5 Surf ===
The Just5 Surf has a streamlined design and backs away from the blocky buttons that could be seen in the previous models. It still displays a colorful case available with either black or lime as the base color. It follows the simplification mindset and as multiple compromises were made for the device, its price was kept small making it accessible to anyone.

=== Just5 Spacer ===
The Just5 Spacer was released in November 2013 and is the latest mobile phone by Just5. It features a 5" touchscreen, an 8MP camera on the back and a 2Mp one on the front and a variety of other features and is their attempt at establishing itself in the smartphone market with a competitively priced device. It has been critiqued for having a weak GPS radio and an unstable Wi-Fi MAC address that changes each time WiFi is enabled or the device boots.

In October 2014, the Just5 Spacer 2 was released for the general public as the successor of the initial Just5 Spacer. It brings an improved screen and GPS fixes to the table while still keeping the price fairly low, compared to the competing products, but has shown touch registering and battery life issues during testing.

In December 2014 the next version of Spacer was released called Spacer 2s.

=== More Recent Models ===
From February 2015 through October 2017, Just5 released ten models of its new Blaster, Freedom, and Cosmo phones.
