= Riga Passenger Terminal =

Port in Riga, Latvia

Coordinates: 56.958889°N 24.094444°E

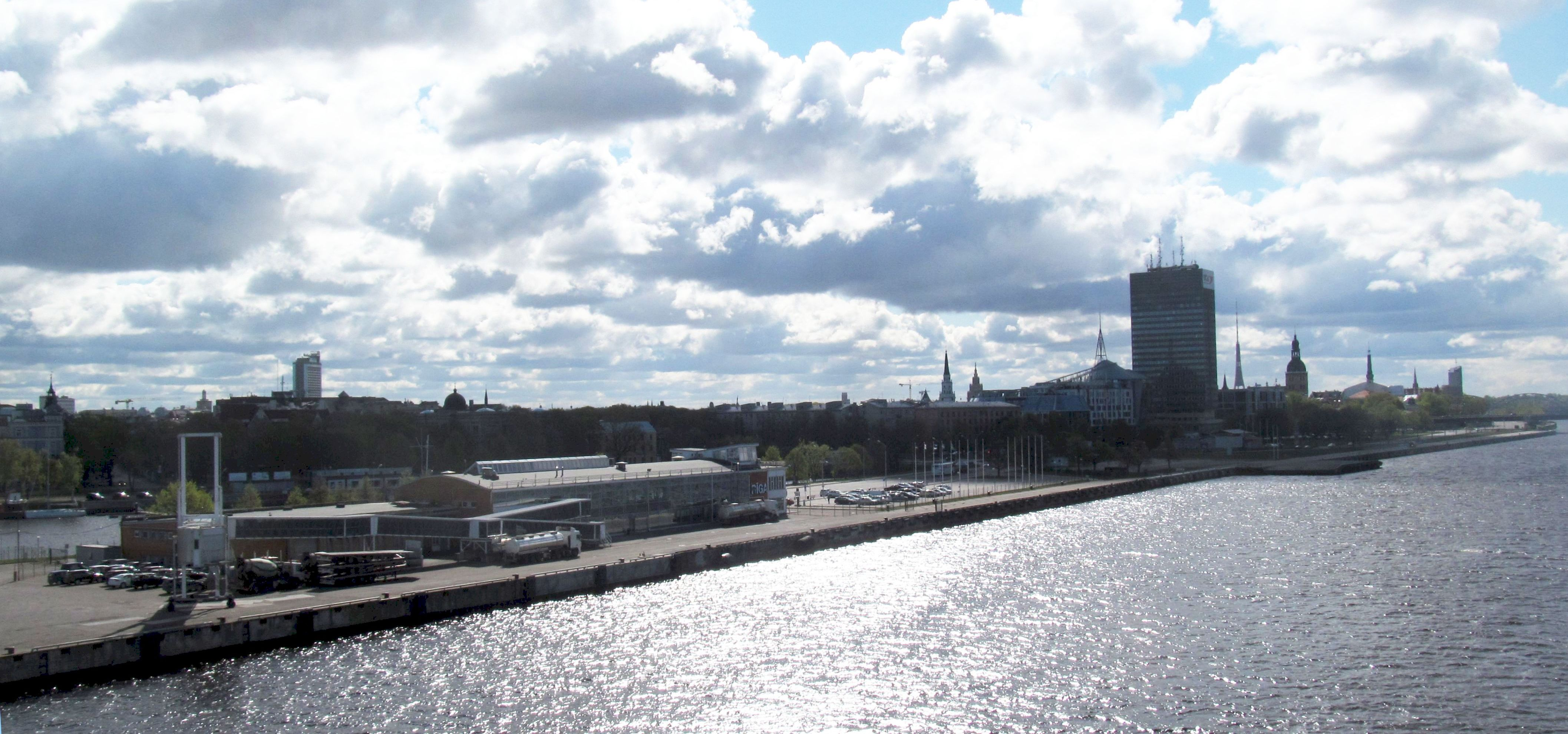
Approaching Riga Passenger Terminal

Riga Passenger Terminal (Latvian: Rīgas pasažieru termināls) is a terminal in Riga, Latvia, that services public and private passenger traffic by sea. The terminal is situated at the address 3A Eksporta Street.

== Destinations ==
There are currently no ferry services going to and from Riga.
