= Dzintars (company) =

Latvian cosmetics company

- Native name: AS "Dzintars"
- Type: Joint-stock company
- Industry: Cosmetics, perfumery
- Predecessor: Riga cosmetics factory Dzintars
- Founded: 7 November 1991
- Defunct: 8 December 2023
- Fate: Liquidated after insolvency proceedings
- Headquarters: Riga, Latvia
- Products: Perfumes, cosmetics, skin-care products and hygiene products

AS Dzintars was a Latvian cosmetics and perfumery manufacturer based in Riga. The joint-stock company was registered on 7 November 1991, while its industrial lineage was traced to the H. A. Brieger soap and perfumery factory founded in Riga in 1849 and to the Soviet-era Riga cosmetics factory Dzintars.

Dzintars manufactured perfumes, skin-care products, decorative cosmetics, oral-care products and soap. It became widely known in the Soviet Union and later operated its own retail and franchise network. The company was declared insolvent in November 2019. Its production site and other assets were sold in 2020, and a separate company later renamed H.A. Brieger resumed manufacturing products under the Dzintars brand. AS Dzintars was removed from the Latvian Register of Enterprises on 8 December 2023.

== History ==
=== Industrial origins and Soviet period ===
Heinrich Adolf Brieger established a soap-making business in Riga in 1849, near the present-day intersection of Baznīcas and Stabu streets. The early factory produced soap and candles and later developed perfumery production.

Following post-war nationalization and reorganization of the cosmetics industry, the Mētra chemical, candle and tube factory became the Riga cosmetics factory Dzintars in 1951. It merged with the Sarkana Ausma factory in 1958, and in 1976 was reorganized as the Riga perfumery and cosmetics production association Dzintars. During the Soviet period, the enterprise produced perfumes, eau de cologne, creams, decorative cosmetics, toothpaste and soap. A 2012 profile in Forbes Kazakhstan described Dzintars as a factory known throughout the Soviet Union and as an integrated manufacturing complex that also produced packaging components.

=== Joint-stock company ===
A founding meeting in October 1991 approved the creation of the joint-stock company Dzintars, which was formally registered on 7 November 1991. Iļja Gerčikovs, who had headed the factory since 1974, continued to lead the company after Latvian independence.

The collapse of the Soviet market sharply reduced production and disrupted established supply and distribution links. The company subsequently developed new formulations and expanded its own retail and franchise network. By 2012, it operated 50 branded stores in Latvia and approximately 50 franchise outlets abroad.

=== Financial difficulties and insolvency ===
The Riga Zemgale District Court opened legal protection proceedings for Dzintars on 17 October 2016. The company had recorded sales of €5.911 million and a loss of €2.633 million for 2015. In a 2017 interview with Diena, Gerčikovs attributed the company's financial strain to the 2008 economic crisis, shrinking traditional eastern markets and unpaid receivables.

A 2019 Latvijas Avīze analysis described longer-running structural problems, including losses since 2008, a comparatively low export share, high staffing levels and weaknesses in corporate governance and management succession. By October 2019, the company's state tax debt had risen from €3.46 million at the beginning of the legal protection process to approximately €6.82 million.

The Riga City Pārdaugava Court declared AS Dzintars insolvent on 12 November 2019 after finding that it had failed to comply with the legal protection plan. In May 2020, recognized creditor claims totalled €16.961 million.

=== Asset sale and production under H.A. Brieger ===
The production property, equipment, vehicles, office assets and trademarks of AS Dzintars were sold for €5.5 million in 2020 to Ritrem, a company associated with Skinest Group. The post-insolvency producer was a separate legal entity. Firmas.lv records H.A. Brieger as having been registered on 20 December 2006; the company previously operated under the names Instruments and Dzintars Production before adopting the H.A. Brieger name in January 2021. The new company resumed manufacturing products under the Dzintars brand in 2021.

=== Trademark dispute and liquidation ===
Litigation followed the transfer of several Dzintars trademarks to Gerčikovs and another legal entity while AS Dzintars was under legal protection. In December 2021, a Riga court invalidated the transactions and restored the company's rights to the national and international Dzintars and Future Formula trademarks. The Riga Regional Court upheld that judgment in June 2022. The ruling became final in September 2022 after the Supreme Court declined to initiate cassation proceedings.

The insolvency process was ended after completion of the creditor-claims recovery plan. AS Dzintars was removed from the Register of Enterprises on 8 December 2023.
