= School of Young Geographers =

Coordinates: 56°57′02″N 24°06′58″E

School of Young Geographers (Latvian: Jauno ģeogrāfu skola) is an extracurricular educational body that prepares primary and secondary school students in geography, geology, environmental science and other related disciplines.

The school was founded on 23 February 1975 by a group of students of the Faculty of Geography of the University of Latvia led by Egils Birznieks. It has been operating uninterrupted ever since, being one of the oldest extant organisations of extracurricular education in Latvia.

It is located primarily in Riga, Latvia with its subsidiaries in Valmiera, Liepāja and Daugavpils. For certain periods its sister schools have been operated in other cities of Latvia: Grobiņa, Jelgava, Ogre, Salaspils, Rēzekne, Kuldīga and Druva.

Up to 500 school students participate in the monthly events organised by the School in 4 regions of Latvia. in its non-formal education events: quizzes, presentations, research conferences, wilderness expeditions, fieldworks and outdoor games. The School also organises annual national geography olympiads in Latvia and international olympiads in the Baltic Sea region.

== Presidents of the school ==
Presidents of the central school

- Anita Vanaga - 1976-1977
- Tālis Jaunzemis - 1977-1979
- Anita Tišlere - 1979-1982
- Juris Paiders - 1982-1986
- Ilmārs Mežs - 1986-1989
- Aivars Beldavs - 1989-1992
- Gatis Pāvils - 1992-1996
- Mārtiņš Vimba - 1996-1998
- Uldis Klepers - since 1998

Presidents of the Vidzeme School of Young Geographers

- Uldis Klepers - 1998-2000
- Andris Vinters - 2000-2007
- Gatis Kampernovs - since 2007

Presidents of Latgale School of Young Geographers

- Gatis Kampernovs - 2011-2015
- Edmunds Gutāns - since 2015

== Recognition ==
In 1978 the Geographic Society of the Soviet Union awarded the School with its honorary medal for contribution in extracurricular education of the Soviet Union. Both its founder Egils Birznieks and its longest running president Uldis Klepers have been awarded Kronvald's prize by the president of Latvia for their lifetime contribution to the education of Latvia.
