= Geology of Latvia =

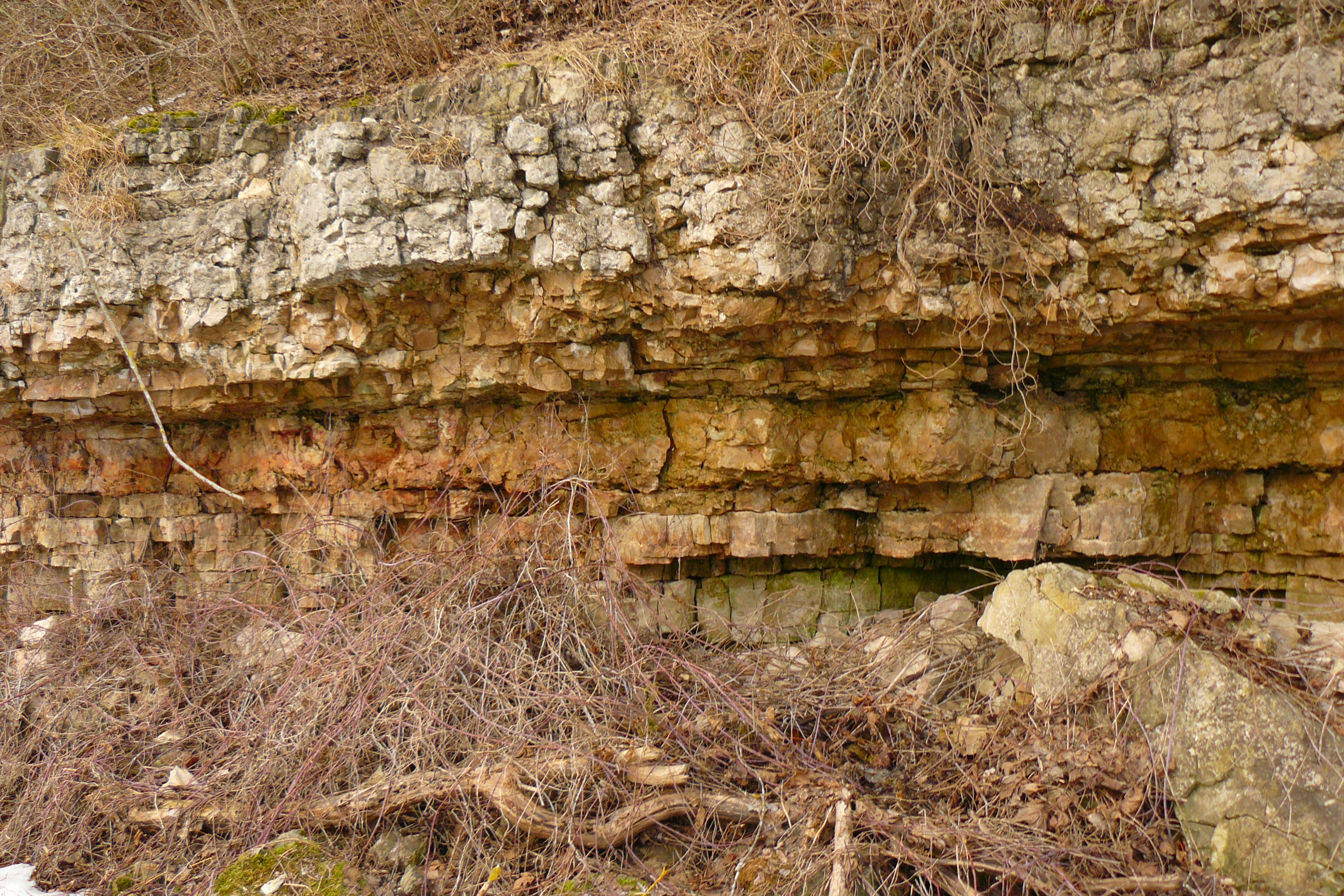
Cliff of sedimentary rock layers at Doles sala

Geology of Latvia includes an ancient Archean and Proterozoic crystalline basement overlain with Neoproterozoic volcanic rocks and numerous sedimentary rock sequences from the Paleozoic, some from the Mesozoic and many from the recent Quaternary past. Latvia is a country in the Baltic region of Northern Europe.

== Geologic history, stratigraphy, and tectonics ==
Several hundred boreholes have returned data about the Precambrian crystalline basement of Latvia, indicating young Middle Proterozoic intrusive rocks such as 1.65 billion year old rapakivi granite or 1.82 billion year old granodiorite in the northeast. Most basement probably formed before the Svecofennian orogeny, between the Archean and Proterozoic.

The Valmiera-Lokno Rise has early Archean amphibolite, gneiss, granitoid and migmatite under the east of Latvia, although metavolcanics, granulite gneiss and magnetite-bearing quartzite are most common in the Riga Megablock. The Garsene-Limbazi megablock has steeply dipping amphibolite, epidote amphibolite, plagiogneiss, migmatite granite, magnetite-rich quartzite (in the south) from the Proterozoic. Low-grade metavolcanics and 1.8 billion year old granodiorites cover the Riga Megablock in the Adazi assemblage. The Riga Pluton (or Kurzeme Pluton) is a large intrusion from 1.65 billion years ago with gabbro, anorthosite and rapakivi granite, covered in unmetamorphosed Pavilosta Formation volcanics along the west coast.

Mesoproterozoic rocks are separated from the Neoproterozoic by an erosion horizon. In western Latvia, basalt, gabbro-norite dikes, tuff, sand and gravel (sediments in the Zuru beds), limburgite and basaltic picrate are particularly common. The Valdai Group holds extensive siltstone, sandstone and clay from the Neoproterozoic.

=== Paleozoic (541–251 million years ago) ===
Cambrian rocks trace the Precambrian subsurface and the oldest, 50 to 130 meters thick are found in the east, including shale, argillite and sandstone. Fossil evidence indicates they correlate with the Cambrian Blue Shale in Estonia, early and middle Cambrian rocks in the west are about 220 meters thick. Upper parts of the lower section have brown oolite iron ore in argillite with a thickness of up to five meters and some rocks in the west host small amounts of oil.

Except in the north-center of the country, Ordovician rocks are everywhere in the subsurface and include argillite, shale and limestone about 250 meters thick at an average depth of 1.7 kilometers below sea level.

A disconformity separates Silurian rocks from Ordovician rocks and they are common in the subsurface, about 950 meters deep in the west or 162 meters in the north. Most are carbonate rocks with 23 different known graptolite zones.

Since the late 19th century, researchers have often focused on widespread Devonian rocks up to 900 meters thick that often directly underlie Quaternary deposits and outcrop along streams. Early Devonian rocks are 250 meters thick including siltstone, shale, sandstone, clay and ostracoderm fossils. Middle Devonian rocks have a shift toward argillite and gypsum and gypsum is quarried in Salaspils-Sauriesli between Ogre and Riga. Famenninan Stage dolomite and siltstone is up to 140 meters thick, overlain by Frasnian dolomite, quarried in the east for us ceramics.

Carboniferous rocks are limited to the southwest, with Tournasian age dolomitic sandstone, dolomite, sandstone and siltstone 104 meters thick.

Permian rocks are also confined to the southwest, with a significant disconformity from underlying Carboniferous rocks. Permian rocks from the Kazanian are 35 meters thick with carbonate shale, dolomite, limestone and sandstone.

=== Mesozoic (251–66 million years ago) ===
Only small areas in the southwest have Triassic rocks, including 74 meters of carbonate clays, sandstone and siltstone. Jurassic rocks are also confined to the southwest and are thinner at only 27 meters and include clay, quartz sands, sandstone, lignite, and siltstone with foraminifera fossils.

=== Cenozoic (66 million years ago – present) ===
Cenozoic units are largely absent in Latvia, except from the past 2.5 million years of the Quaternary, which cover the entire country, except where wave erosion has stripped them away on the east-central shore of the Gulf of Riga (or in some river valleys). In buried valleys, these sediments can be up to 310 meters thick, although the average thickness is up to 20 meters in lowlands 40 to 60 meters in highlands. Between Cesis and Madona and in the Vidzeme Highland in south-central part of the country, thicknesses can reach up to 200 meters. The Latgale Formation includes Precambrian crystalline clasts and gray clay left over from the first Pleistocene glaciation. Zidini Formation interglacial lakebed sediments overlie the Latgale up to 23.5 meters thick.

The overlying Letiza Formation correlates with formations such as the Oka in Russia or Sangaste in Estonia, associated with the Elsterian glaciation and includes till atop Jurassic rock. Eight meters of lacustrine sediment in the Pulvernieki or marine clays in the Akmenrags Formation line up with the mid-Pleistocene Holsteinian glaciation. Along the Baltic coast, up to 60 meters of brackish sand—the Jurkalne Member—overlies the Akmenrags Formation. The Kurzeme Formation gray calcareous material is widespread, left from the most extensive period of glaciation. The last interglacial is marked by the Felicianova Formation alluvium, overlain by Baltic group sediments from the last glacial advance.

Glacial retreat and oscillation took place from 25,000 to 12,000 years ago, leaving the 90 meter Latvia Formation, including the Jelgava Member lacustrine deposits. Major spillways drained the landscape, emptying the Baltic Ice Lake which flooded much of the region. The Yoldia Sea, Ancillus Lake, Littorina Sea and Limnea Sea all existed during the early Holocene, leaving behind shoreline deposits.
