= Telecommunications in Latvia =

Telecommunications in Latvia encompass a broad range of services including the internet, telephones, television, and radio.

== Internet and digital progress ==
=== Users and skills ===
In Latvia, the digital engagement and proficiency of the population closely align with European Union (EU) averages. In 2022, internet usage among individuals reached 90%, marginally above the EU average of 89%. When it comes to digital skills, 51% of Latvians aged 16 to 74 have at least basic digital skills, slightly below the EU average of 54%. Additionally, 24% of the population have above basic digital skills, narrowly under the EU's 26%. Latvia has shown progress in digital content creation, with 64% of its population possessing basic skills in this area, nearing the EU average of 66%.

=== Fixed broadband ===
As of 2022, Latvia has achieved 92% household coverage with Fixed Very High Capacity Network (VHCN), surpassing the EU average of 73%, and 91% coverage with Fibre to the Premises (FTTP), well above the EU's 56%. The uptake of broadband services at speeds of at least 100 Mbps in Latvia is 62%, slightly above the EU average of 55%. However, the adoption of 1 Gbps broadband is notably low at less than 0.1%, compared to the EU average of 13.8%. In efforts to further improve its fixed broadband infrastructure, Latvia has made strategic investments, including a EUR 4 million investment from the Recovery and Resilience Facility (RRF) aimed at 'last-mile' VHCN development, and an additional EUR 8.7 million from the European Regional Development Fund (ERDF). These investments are directed towards enhancing high-speed internet access across the country.

=== Mobile broadband ===
In Latvia, mobile broadband adoption was at 86% among individuals in 2021, just below the EU average of 87%. By mid-2022, 5G coverage in Latvia had reached 42% of populated areas, which is considerably lower than the EU average of 81%. The allocation of 5G spectrum in Latvia stood at 63% of the total harmonized 5G spectrum by 2023, approaching the EU average of 68%. To further develop its 5G infrastructure, Latvia has allocated nearly EUR 8.3 million from the European Regional Development Fund (ERDF) for constructing passive infrastructure along the Rail Baltica, which is part of the country's efforts to expand 5G coverage.

=== Digital public services ===
In 2022, 77% of internet users in Latvia utilized e-government services, higher than the EU average of 74%. The country achieved scores of 87 out of 100 for digital public services for citizens and 86 out of 100 for businesses, exceeding the EU averages of 77 and 84, respectively. Additionally, Latvia's access to e-health records scored 79 out of 100, outperforming the EU average of 72. Latvia participates in the 'GovTech4all' consortia to advance public sector innovation. Despite high e-government service usage, additional efforts are underway to enhance the appeal of these services. The country has taken regulatory steps to improve online public service accessibility and is expanding the State and Municipal Unified Customer Service Centres (CSCs) network, aiming for 592 CSCs by 2026.

== Telephones ==
Calling code: +371

International call prefix: 00

Fixed lines:

- ~174,000 lines, 122nd in the world (2022);
- ~501,000 lines, 97th in the world (2012);
- ~644,000 lines (2007).

Mobile cellular:

- ~2.2 million lines, 147th in the world (2022);
- ~2.3 million lines (2012);
- ~2.2 million lines (2007).

Telephone system: Recent efforts have focused on bringing competition to the telecommunications sector; the number of fixed lines is decreasing as mobile-cellular telephone service expands; the number of telecommunications operators has grown rapidly since the fixed-line market opened to competition in 2003; combined fixed-line and mobile-cellular subscribership is roughly 150 per 100 persons; the Latvian network is now connected via fiber optic cable to Estonia, Finland, and Sweden (2008).

Until 2003 Lattelecom had a monopoly in the fixed telecommunications market. This led to overwhelming use of cellular phones for private customers, fixed lines being requested mostly by companies. In Latvia, there exist more than 2 million mobile cellular phone lines but only 174,000 fixed phone connections as of 2022.

Since the fixed-line voice communication monopoly ended on January 1, 2003, several companies entered the market for fixed voice communication services: Aeronavigācijas serviss, Baltcom TV, Beta Telecom, Latvenergo Tehniskais Centrs, OPTRON, Rigatta, Telecentrs, Telenets, Telekom Baltija, CSC Telecom and Bite Latvija. These voice telephony providers provide services for cheaper foreign calls, as well as local calls. The telecom regulator SPRK tries to provide a competitive environment so that new operators can compete with Lattelecom which owns most of the last-mile connections.

== Radio and television ==
Radio stations:

- Publicly owned broadcaster operates 6 radio networks with dozens of stations throughout the country; dozens of private broadcasters also operate radio stations (2007);
- AM 1, FM 234 (2016).

Radios: 1.76 million (1997).

The state public radio broadcaster is Latvijas Radio.

Television stations:

- Several national and regional commercial TV stations are foreign-owned, 2 national TV stations are publicly owned; system supplemented by privately owned regional and local TV stations; cable and satellite multi-channel TV services with domestic and foreign broadcasts available (2007);
- 44 plus 31 repeaters (1995).

Televisions: 1.22 million (1997).

The state public television broadcaster is Latvijas Televīzija.

== Internet censorship and surveillance ==
There is no OpenNet Initiative (ONI) country profile, but Latvia is shown as no evidence of Internet filtering in all areas for which ONI tests (political, social, conflict/security, and Internet tools) on the ONI global Internet filtering maps.

The constitution and law provide for freedom of speech and of the press. There are no government restrictions on access to the Internet or reports that the government monitors e-mail or Internet chat rooms. Individuals and groups engage in the peaceful expression of views via the Internet, including by e-mail.

In September 2010 the government's Corruption Prevention and Combating Bureau (KNAB), which enforces campaign laws, removed a satirical film, The Last Bear Slayer, from the on-demand playlist of the partially state-owned cable provider, Lattelecom. The KNAB stated that the film might have constituted election advertising. Reporters Without Borders charged that the prohibition constituted improper censorship, but noted it was ineffective because the film was widely available on the Internet.

On June 1, 2014 new subsection 22 of section 19 of Electronic Communications Law was enforced to enable blocking unlicensed gambling websites. Since then, the Lotteries and Gambling Supervisory Inspection of Latvia has been maintaining the list of blocked websites.

== See also ==
- Latvian Internet Exchange
- Latvia
