= Elko Grupa =

Company based in Riga, Latvia

ELKO Group
- Company type: Public
- Industry: Electronics distribution
- Founded: 1993
- Headquarters: Riga, Latvia
- Key people: Egons Mednis (President) Svens Dinsdorfs (CEO)
- Revenue: US$1.883 billion (2019)
- Net income: 6,581,703 euro (2023)
- Total assets: 181,627,416 euro (2023)
- Number of employees: 1,500
- Website: www.elkogroup.com

ELKO Group (ELKO Grupa AS) is an international, Latvian-based distributor of information technology (IT) and consumer electronics products in Europe and Central Asia.

The company acts as a consultant to partners and as a wholesaler of computer and electronic products. ELKO operates in 31 countries, with sales offices in 13 countries: Latvia, Estonia, Lithuania, Ukraine, Romania, Slovenia, Slovakia, Czech Republic, Hungary, Croatia, Sweden, Poland, and Kazakhstan. The headquarters of ELKO is located in Riga, Latvia.

ELKO is a member of the Global Technology Distribution Council (GTDC), the Exporters Association "The Red Jackets" in Latvia, the Latvian Logistics Association, and the Latvian Chamber of Commerce and Industry,

== History ==
In 1993, four young entrepreneurs from Latvia founded ELKO Group. In order to reorganize the governance, ELKO created a holding company, ELKO Grupa AS.

In 2005, ELKO Group became the largest company in Latvia by turnover. In 2007, ELKO Group became the first Latvian company to reach US$1 billion in turnover. In 2017, ELKO entered the Nordic-region market by acquiring Gandalf, a distributor of computers and peripheral products in Sweden. In 2018, ELKO acquired Absolut Trading Company, a Russian distributor of household appliances and electronics. In 2019, the ELKO Group company WESTech, a distributor of IT products in Slovakia, completed the acquisition of ARAŠID.

The company was listed among the finalists for Distributor of the Year in the European IT and Software Excellence Awards 2020. In 2020, ELKO Group's turnover exceeded US$2 billion.
