= Scandiweb =

Software development agency in Latvia

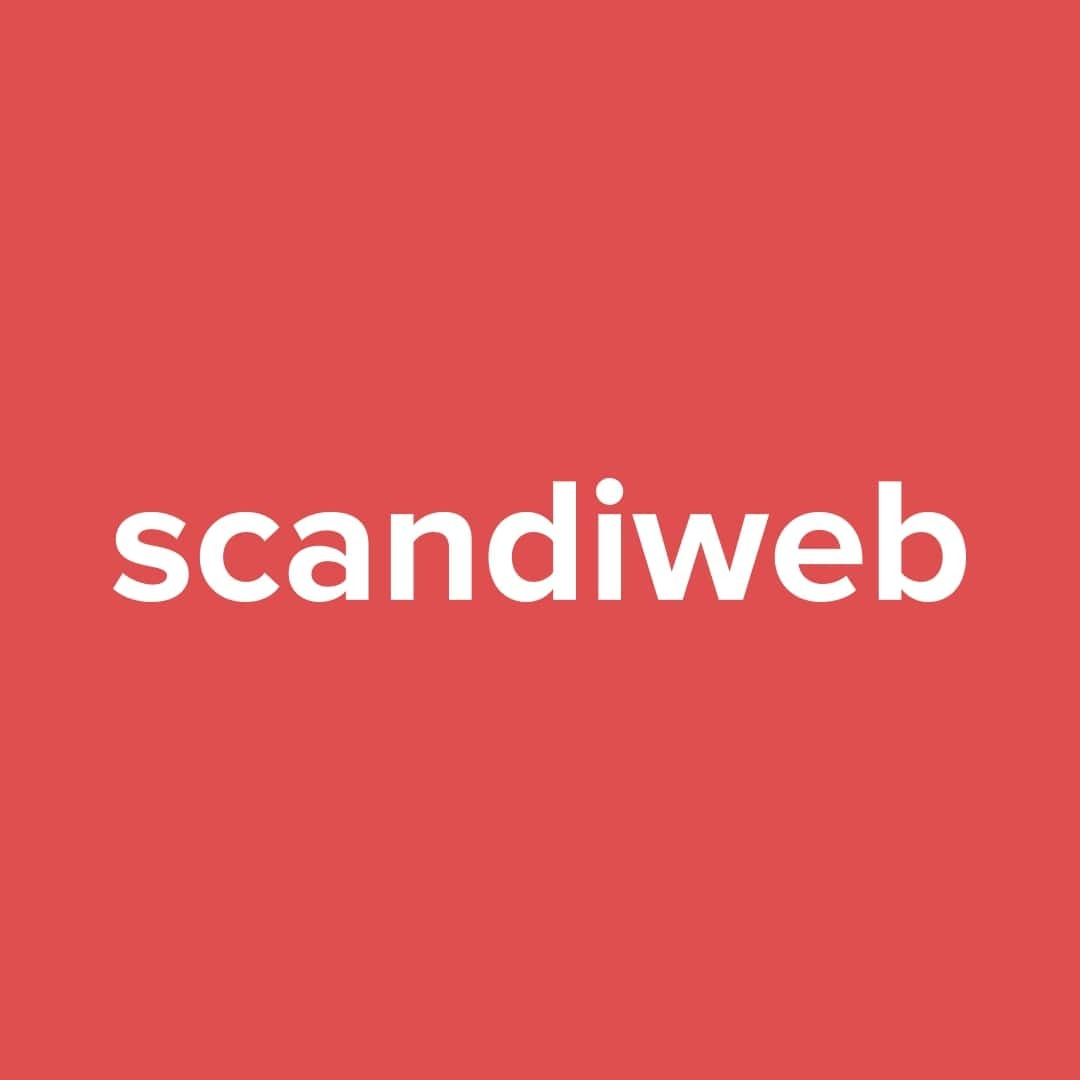
- Industry: Digital strategy
- Founded: 2003
- Headquarters: Riga, Latvia
- Area served: Worldwide
- Services: Marketing, Web development
- Website: scandiweb.com

scandiweb is a web development, digital strategy, AI consultation & implementation agency specializing in the Magento (Adobe Commerce) platform. The company was established in 2003 in Latvia by Antons Sapriko. It has offices in the United States, Sweden, Latvia, and Georgia. scandiweb provides solutions for primarily eCommerce businesses and acts as a strategic partner for IT development focusing on web, mobile, and big data analysis. T

== Partnerships ==
scandiweb is an official Adobe Gold Partner, with the largest team of Adobe Commerce-certified employees.

The company holds the Google Premier Partner status for 2025, placing it among top 3% agencies globally.

scandiweb is a BigCommerce Certified Partner and a Pimcore Platinum Partner.

Since 2016, scandiweb has been collaborating with Oro, Inc., an open-source business application development firm.

scandiweb is a Platinum Partner of Hyvä, working with the Magento 2 frontend theme to optimize performance metrics.

The company is also a Sanity Agency Partner, assisting with content management through Sanity’s headless CMS.
