= Krustkalni Nature Reserve =

Protected area in Latvia

- Latvian: Krustkalnu dabas rezervāts
- IUCN category Ib (wilderness area)
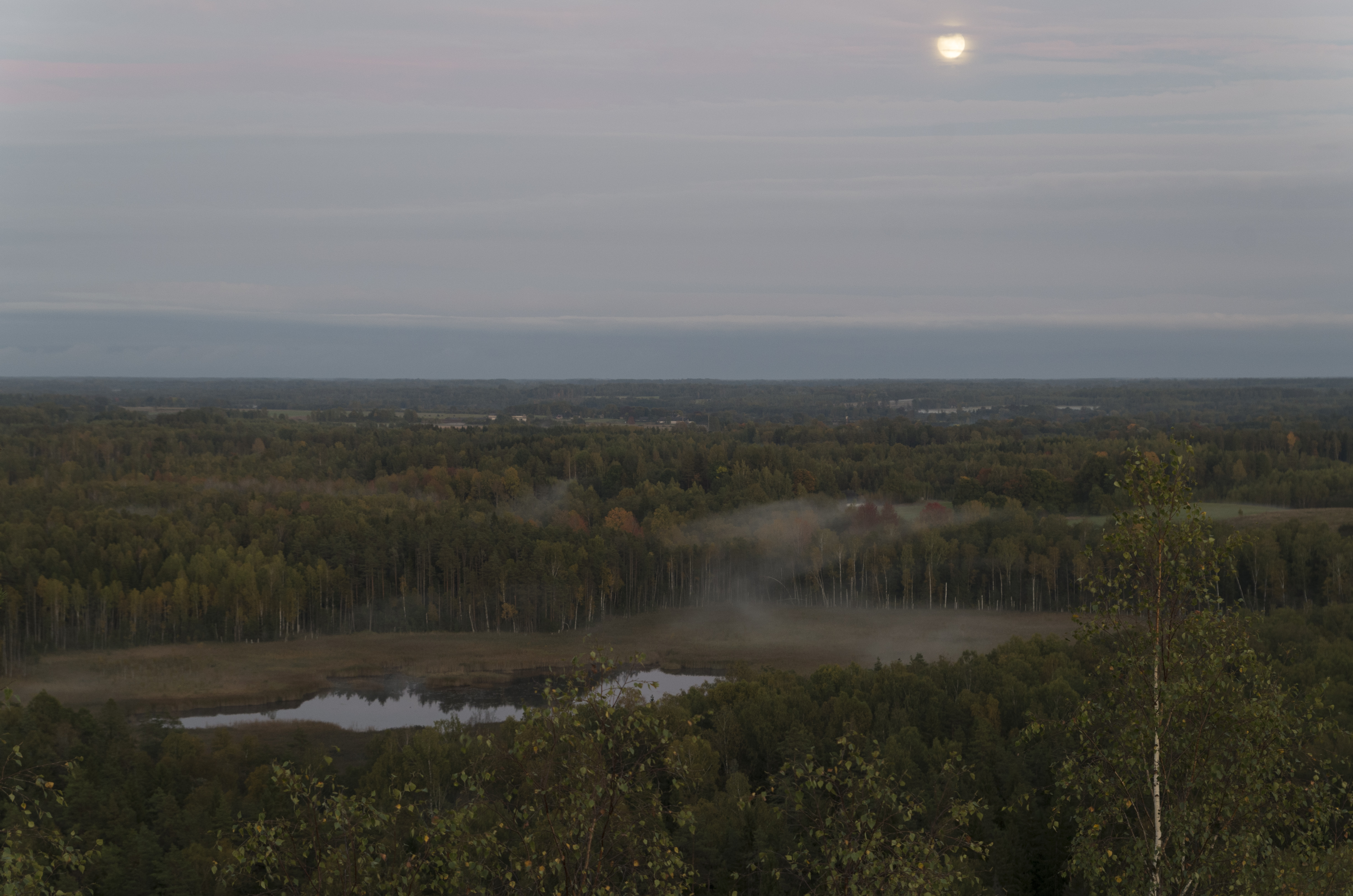

- Location within Latvia
- Location: Eastern Latvia
- Nearest city: Madona
- Coordinates: 56°46′00″N 26°09′00″E
- Area: 2,979 ha (7,360 acres)
- Established: April 15, 1977

Krustkalni Nature Reserve (Latvian: Krustkalnu dabas rezervāts) is a nature reserve located in eastern Latvia that was founded in 1977. It has an area of 2,978 hectares. Since 2004, this institution has been part of Natura 2000, a European Union network of protected areas. The reserve is managed by the Latgale regional administration.

The nature reserve was created to preserve the characteristic biodiversity of the complex of water and forest ecosystems, a complex of coniferous forests and meadows, as well as underground springs that form small swamps and lakes. A feature of these springs is high calcium content, due to which limestone soils are formed. They encourage the growth of calciphile plants, which often occur in the coastal areas of the country, but are not typical of eastern Latvia. The reserve has 32 species of plants and 37 species of animals listed in the Latvian Red Book, and the number of Red Book plants in Krustkalni ranks second among the country's reserves.

== History ==
Before its creation, the lands of the reserve belonged to the Krustkalni forest research station. Even before the establishment of the protected area, both Baltic German and Latvian naturalists, including Nikolajs Malta, knew that this region had the richest flora of eastern Latvia. Due to the difficult terrain, these areas were challenging to cultivate and impossible to apply intensive methods of forestry. At the same time, due to the height differences and the variety of landscapes, this area was characterized by rich vegetation and fauna. Given these two factors, From the 1950s, researchers from the University of Latvia and the university's Institute of Biology began to explore the area, and it became a venue for student field internships. Under the leadership of the Institute of Biology, the first nature reserve in eastern Latvia was established there on April 15, 1977. In total 69 land lots of the forest became a nature reserve, but temporarily remained in use by the research station. In 1979 the Slītere Nature Reserve was established, to which all other Latvian reserves including Krustkalni were subordinated. In 1982 Teiči Nature Reserve was organized, also in eastern Latvia. Since the Teiči reserve was located in the same region as Krustkalni, a joint administration was established for the reserves, subordinated to the Latvian Production Forestry Association "Latvias Mejs". Since February 1, 2011, the joint administration of both eastern Latvian reserves has been under the direction of the Latgale regional administration.

== Climate ==
The reserve is located in the transition zone between the Central Vidzeme Upland with its harsh climate and the Lubāna Plain, which is characterized by warmer continental air. The influence of the coastal climate on its territory is weakened due to the relative separation from the coast of the Baltic Sea and the middle Latvian uplands. The frost-free period, with temperatures above 5 °C, lasts 180 days. The average minimum temperature is -28 °C. 600 mm precipitation falls here annually and is distributed as follows: about 350 mm evaporates, and 250 mm becomes surface runoff. The varied terrain determines the diversity of microclimatic conditions in parts of the reserve.

== Geography and hydrology ==
The reserve is located in eastern Latvia, on the border of the Vidzeme and Latgale historical regions. Its territory lies entirely within Madona Municipality, whose center, the city of Madona, is 15 km from the boundaries of the reserve. The outline of the reserve resembles a triangle, which reaches the village of Mārciena in the northwest, in the northeast is bounded by the Madona–Jēkabpils road, and in the south the Aiviekste river, which flows on the outskirts of Ļaudona village.

The area of the reserve lies on the Middle Daugava Lowland, however, the nature of the terrain is similar to the nearby Central Vidzeme Upland. During the last ice age, there was significant deposition of glacial material, which formed the Madonsko-Trepsky shaft. Krustalny occupies its narrowest part from Lake Dreimaņa (or Svētes, Latvian: Dreimaņa ezers) in the north to the Aiviekste River in the south. Within the reserve, the shaft consists of 2–5 ridges, up to 4 km long, with a total width of 1–2 km at 153 m above sea level. Each of the ridges is 70 to 250 m wide, and has a relative height of up to 50 m and a slope of about 35°. Between the ridges are lowlands (well drained or swampy) and wide ravines.

Along the south-eastern slope of the Madonsko-Trepsky shaft stretches the Dooku-Svetes depression, at an elevation of 95–100 m. It is the flat bottom of an ancient lake that existed in the Holocene. A large amount of carbonates were deposited in the lakebed, and for some time lime was mined there industrially. Now on the site of the former quarries some ponds have gradually overgrown and turned into meadows.

There are many bodies of water in the reserve, which can be divided into three types: lakes, rivers and springs. The largest in the area are the lakes, of which there are 13. Among them is Lake Dreimaņa, on the southwestern shore of which is a one and a half kilometer peninsula. Like other lakes concentrated in the eastern part of the protected area, Dreimaņa has marshy shores and a bottom composed of limestone with layers of silt. From the lake the Svetupe River flows through the central part of the Dooku-Svetes depression to the south, absorbs the Nidrīte tributary and flows into the Aiviekste. Another river, the Nīdreite, has a spring supply and encircles the reserve from the southwest. All of these rivers are small and winding, with low banks and rich vegetation. The reserves's springs are concentrated at the foot of the hills and on the shores of Lake Dreimaņa.

== Geology and soils ==
The glacial origin of landforms determines the composition of geological rocks. These are large-grained sand, rich in carbonates gravel of fluvio-glacial origin, pebbles with boulders, and less often loams and dusty material. In some places, these materials are covered with boulder loams or sandstones. In the Dooku-Svetes depression, the carbonate rocks began to form in the boreal period and continued to accumulate in the subboreal period, with their deposition ending in the first half of the Atlantic period. The limestones of the depression are floury and fine-grained, with a carbonate content of 88–90%. The limestone layer reaches 5 m in thickness, covered with medium-decomposed peat, which varies in thickness from 0.1 to 2.5 m. Thus the Dooku-Svetes depression has the largest deposits of lake limestone in Latvia.

The soils of the reserve are diverse. In the northern part of the protected area podzol soils predominate, in the rest of the territory peaty podzol, and very small areas are occupied by gleysol and rendzina soils. Among peat soils, the types inherent in fens predominate. Charcoal is found in some of the soil sections, an indicator of forest fires and slash-and-burn agriculture that occurred in ancient times.

== Flora ==
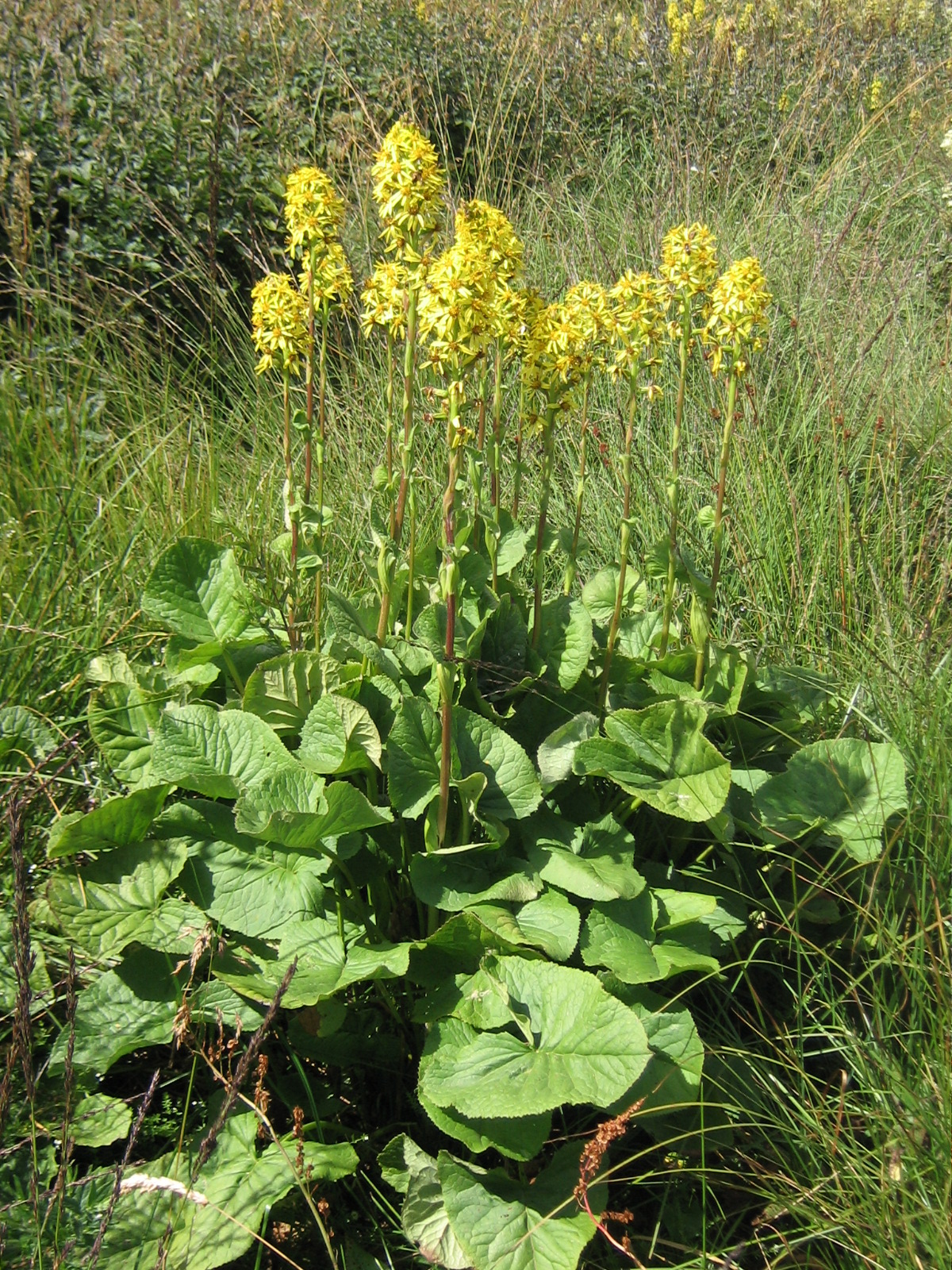
Ligularia sibirica

The reserve's ecosystem hosts 604 taxa of plants including 23 species of ferns, 12 species of gymnosperms and 569 angiosperms. The flora of the reserve is dominated by members of the families Asteraceae, Poaceae, Cyperaceae, Fabaceae and Rosaceae. The Orchidaceae family is also well represented by 17 species.

According to geobotanical zoning, the reserve belongs to the western sub-province of the East Baltic floristic district, but is located close to the border of the eastern sub-province. This is evident by the mixed nature of its flora, which includes both typically eastern Latvian species (for example, Ligularia sibirica) and species that usually grow much further west on the Piejūras lowland. Species with Eurasian, European and subarctic habitats make up a significant part of the protected flora.

=== Forest vegetation ===
The variety of microclimatic conditions and landforms determine a wide range of plant communities and vegetation classifications. The most common plant communities of Krustkalni are pine and spruce forests, which alternate with small-leaved forests, small meadows, overgrown farmland and swamps of various types. The reserve belongs to the Baltic-Belarusian sub-province of the Northern European taiga province of the Eurasian taiga of the Holarctic realm, so the zonal types of forests for it are complex and deciduous spruce. It is these forests that occupy the highest altitude areas, while lower areas are populated with oak forest, aspen and birch, and green mosses (Pleurozium schreberi, Hylocomium splendens and Dicranum polysetum), Pteridium aquilinum, and bilberry (Vaccinium myrtillus). On the slopes of hills, on fertile soils grow spruce forests with Oxalis acetosella cover. Extremely rare are oak forests with green moss cover. In former clearcutting areas, instead of primeval forest, a new forest has formed from grey alder (Alnus incana), and in the undergrowth there are many small-leaved lime (Tilia cordata), hagberry (Prunus padus), rowan (Sorbus aucuparia), and blackcurrant (Ribes nigrum) plants. The grass cover of alders is dominated by common nettle (Urtica dioica), which forms tall and dense thickets. In contrast, the pine forests appear light because they grow on dry sandy soils, which are not suitable for most forest grasses. Instead, the lower layer of vegetation is formed by cranberry bushes with admixtures of Melampyrum pratense and rarely Chimaphila umbellata. On the tops of the hills, this cover changes to a thicket of blueberries or a mixture of cladonia lichens (Cetraria islandica) from Ericaceae.

Forests on carbonate soils have a unique composition. They can be of different types (spruce, aspen, birch, very rarely pine or goat willow), but always contain minor amounts of deciduous species: small-leaved lime, European oak (Quercus robur), Norway maple (Acer platanoides), European white elm (Ulmus laevis) and wych elm (Ulmus glabra). Undergrowth in such forests is very dense and diverse including European fly honeysuckle (Lonicera xylosteum), common hazel (Corylus avellana), guelder rose (Viburnum opulus) and Daphne mezereum. The grass cover of such forests is very similar to the cover of southern oak forests. In particular, it contains a lot of ground elder (Aegopodium podagraria), may lily (Maianthemum bifolium), Anemone hepatica, Dog's mercury (Mercurialis perennis), Asarum europaeum, and sweetscented bedstraw (Galium odoratum).

In the lowest parts of the reserve grow a variety of swampy forests. Birch forests have ground cover formed by sphagnums (peat mosses, mostly Sphagnum magellanicum), marsh Labrador tea (Rhododendron tomentosum) and bilberry; if the forest consists of downy birch (Betula pubescens), then common reed (Phragmites australis), buckbean (Menyanthes), purple moor grass (Molinia caerulea), fibrous tussock-sedge (Carex appropinquata) and Carex cespitosa, and sedges with their turf form a characteristic bumpy microrelief. In spruce forests the grass cover is dominated by ferns and sedges; common alder forests are rich in such herbs as may lily, common nettle, chickweed wintergreen (Lysimachia europaea), ground elder, cabbage thistle (Cirsium oleraceum), and meadow sweet (Filipendula ulmaria). Shrubs are sometimes found in the forests of the reserve which are not very common in Latvia. In dry forests single juniper specimens may be encountered, and on more fertile soils European spindle (Euonymus europaeus) and Euonymus verrucosus.

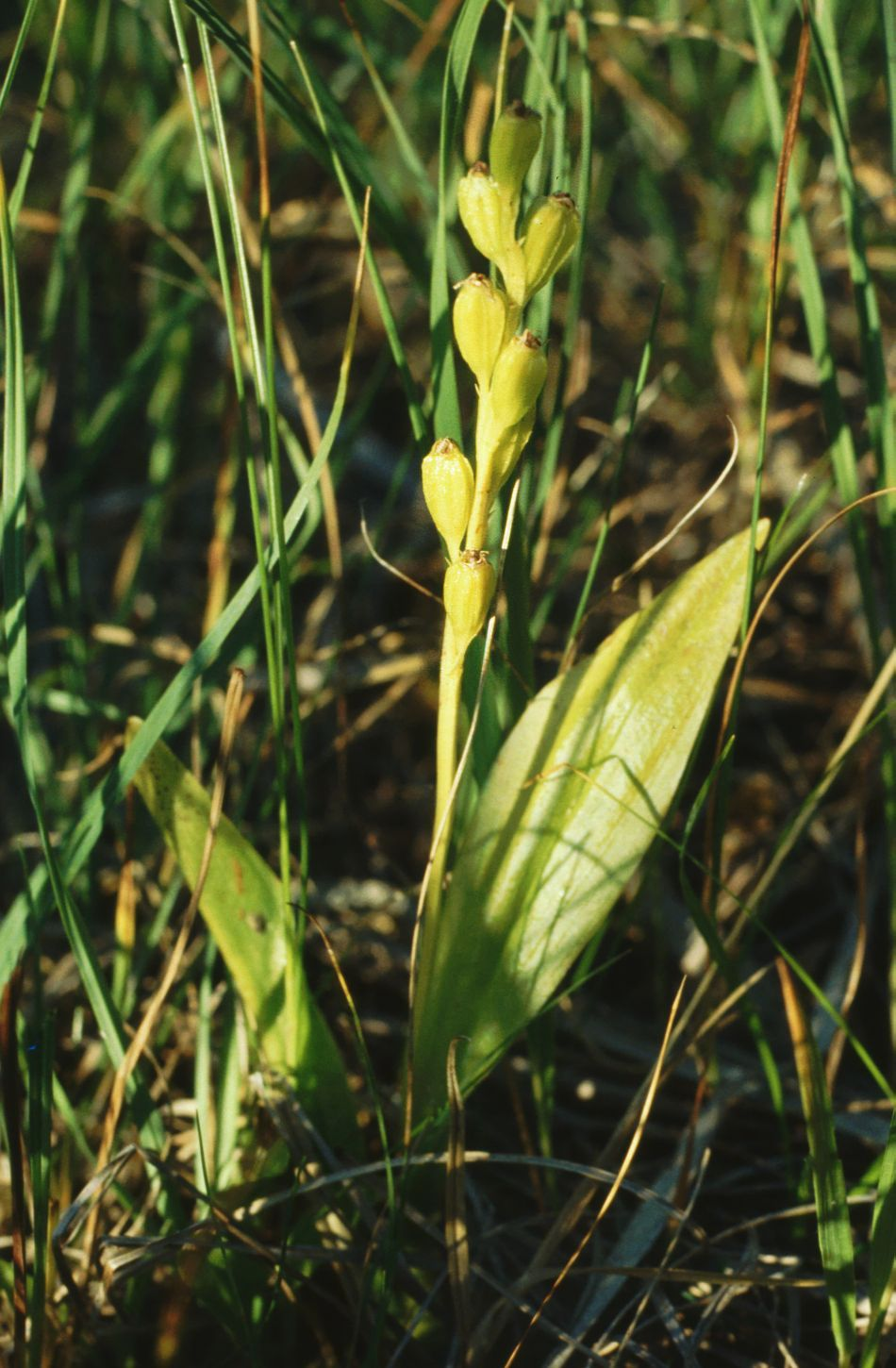
Fen orchid found on the shores of Lake Dreimaņa

=== Meadow vegetation ===
The meadows of the reserve are divided into three types: dry, mesophytic (moderately moist) and lowland. Dry meadows are confined to the slopes of the hills, on their dry and barren lands grow common quaking grass (Briza media), common bent (Agrostis capillaris) and sweet vernal grass (Anthoxanthum odoratum). The mesophytic meadows are dominated by Dactylis glomerata, and in the lowlands, in addition to gramineae, for example, Deschampsia cespitosa, there are representatives of other families such as Geum rivale, meadow sweet, Carex panicea and blister sedge (Carex vesicaria). Two peculiar meadows of the reserve are notable. The first is located at the foot of a hill, where a cold spring precipitates lime on the surrounding ground. In this meadow, tall curtains of greater tussock sedge (Carex paniculata) grow alongside Dactylorhiza russowii and Ligularia sibirica, the reserve containing Latvia's largest population of the latter species. Another meadow occupies Lake Dreimaņa's peninsula, where marshy lime is exposed to the surface, and there are many calcephilic species. Among the sedge grass (Carex) of the peninsula, orchids can be found, namely Epipactis palustris, Dactylorhiza baltica and Dactylorhiza incarnata, as well as saw sedge (Cladium mariscus), which is at the edge of its range. Near the springs on the meadow are green mosses and Fen orchid (Liparis loeselii), and on the shore many reeds (Phragmites).

=== Bog vegetation ===
Krustkalni bogs are confined to either the depressions between the hills or to the shores of lakes. Among them, lowland and fen predominate, and raised bogs are less common. The vegetation of lowland swamps consists of variety of sedge grasses, such as panic grass (Panicum), black sedge (Carex nigra), yellow sedge (Carex flava), blister sedge, bottle sedge (Carex rostrata), and woollyfruit sedge (Carex lasiocarpa), as well as broad leaved cotton grass (Eriophorum latifolium) and individual species of the buckbean and marsh cinquefoil (Comarum palustre). In transitional bogs, blueberries (Cyanococcus), cranberries (Vaccinium oxycoccos), and marsh Labrador tea join these plants. In contrast the raised bogs are very different, and feature peat moss, especially Sphagnum magellanicum, Hare's-tail cottongrass (Eriophorum vaginatum) and insectivorous plants such as English sundew (Drosera anglica) and round-leaved sundew (Drosera rotundifolia). In some places in the swamps, there are thickets formed by different species of willow, common alder and rarely shrubby birch (Betula humilis).

=== Aquatic vegetation ===
The flora of the reserve includes helophytes, plants that grow submerged in water, and species that float freely on the surface. Among the common aquatic plants are marsh cinquefoil, slender tufted-sedge (Carex acuta), Calla palustris (Calla), buckbean, and marsh fern (Thelypteris palustris), and on some lakes common reeds, saw grass (Cladium), broadleaf cattail (Typha latifolia) and narrowleaf cattail (Typha angustifolia). The deeper parts of the lakes are inhabited by the European white water lily (Nymphaea alba), Nymphaea candida, yellow water-lily (Nuphar lutea), common duckweed (Lemna minor), Lemna trisulca, and Canadian pond weed (Elodea canadensis). Underwater "meadows" may be observed, formed by algae of the genus Chara.

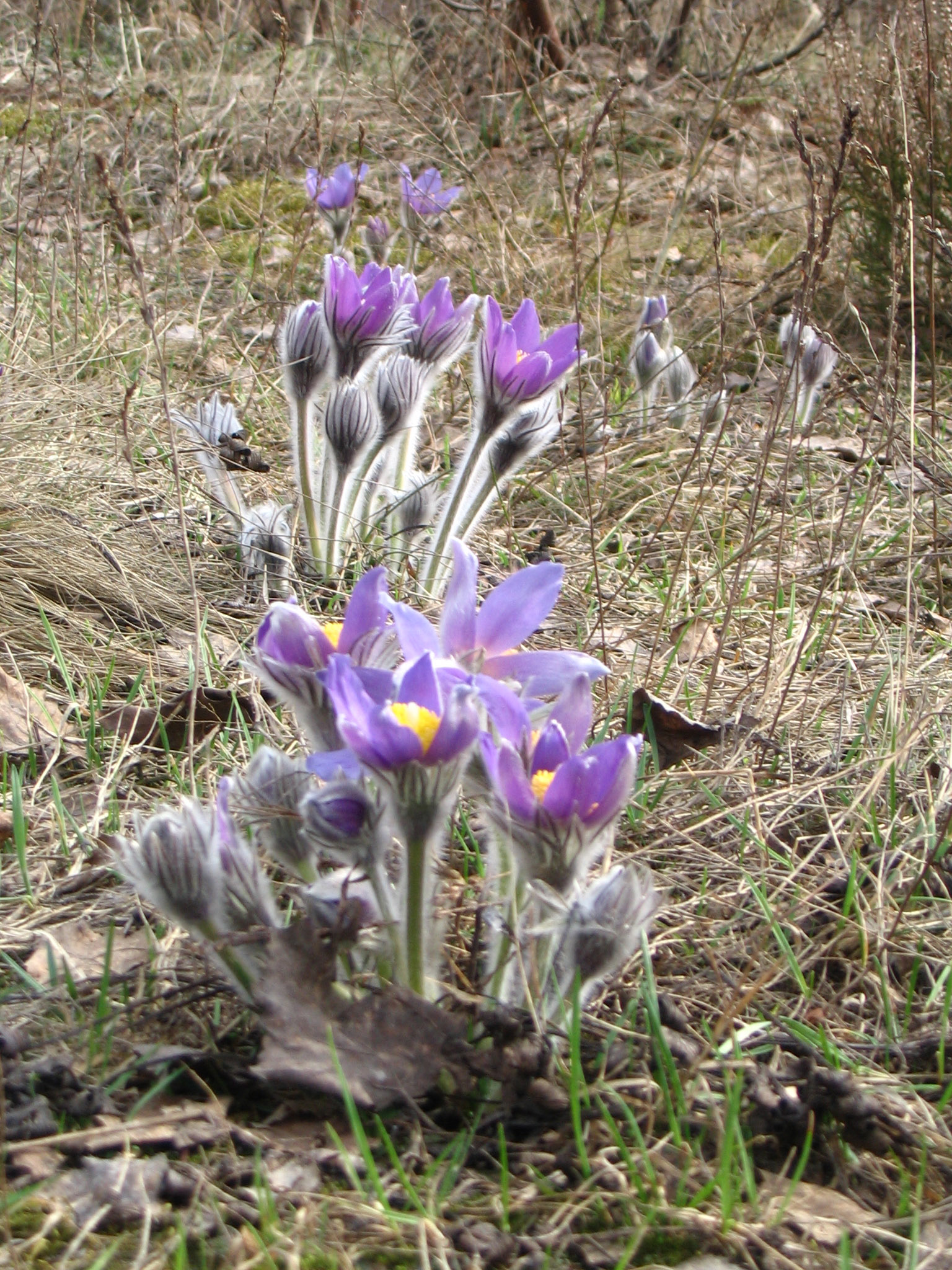
Eastern pasqueflower in bloom

=== Protected vegetation ===
Within the reserve, scientists have identified 32 species of plants listed in the Latvian Red Book, a list of endangered species. Of these, of particular rarity are the swamp sawgrass (Cladium mariscus) and small pasque flower (Pulsatilla pratensis), found in only two places. Species such as Gladiolus imbricatus, Ligularia sibirica, blue cowslip (Pulmonaria angustifolia), and yellow foxglove (Digitalis grandiflora) do not appear at all in other reserves of Latvia. Of scientific interest are the eastern pasqueflower (Pulsatilla patens), Siberian iris (Iris sibirica) and snowdrop windflower (Anemonoides sylvestris), which are located on the western border of their habitats. Less rare, but also subject to protection are the European crab apple (Malus sylvestris), European columbine (Aquilegia vulgaris), common bearberry (Arctostaphylos uva-ursi), yellow coralroot (Corallorhiza trifida), and Schoenus ferrugineus. Orchids are worth a special mention. Most of them prefer moist meadows with calcareous soil. In relatively small areas, Dactylorhiza russowii, Dactylorhiza baltica, Dactylorhiza incarnata, Dactylorhiza fuchsii, Dactylorhiza maculata, Platanthera chlorantha and Platanthera bifolia, Liparis loeselii, Orchis mascula, and Malaxis monophyllos can be found. Only dark-red helleborine (Epipactis atrorubens) prefers the dry sunny roadsides and forest edges. Among the more primitive plants under protection are various specimens of clubmoss (Lycopodiopsida)—stiff clubmoss (Spinulum annotinum), common clubmoss (Lycopodium clavatum), fir clubmoss (Huperzia selago) and groundcedar (Diphasiastrum complanatum).

The species composition of lichens and fungi in the reserve has not been sufficiently studied.

== Fauna ==
In the reserve live 41 species of mammals (70% of the country's mammals), 140 species of birds (45% of the country's birds), 5 species of reptiles, 6 species of amphibians, 21 species of fish and about 400 species of insects. Of these, 37 species are listed in the Latvian Red Book. The species of boreal mixed forests are mostly represented in the local fauna, with much fewer purely taiga and forest-steppe species.

=== Mammals ===
All species of insectivorous mammals in the reserve are common, such as the European hedgehog (Erinaceus europaeus), common shrew (Sorex araneus), Eurasian pygmy shrew (Sorex minutus), and European mole (Talpa europaea). Bats fly into the reserve only for night hunting, and during the day they hide in buildings outside the reserve, in particular in the villages of Ļaudona, Sāviena, and Prauliena. Among the representatives of this series were observed the brown long-eared bat (Plecotus auritus), northern bat (Eptesicus nilssonii), pond bat (Myotis dasycneme), and common noctule (Nyctalus noctula).

The mountain hare (Lepus timidus) is common in the reserve, and European hare (Lepus europaeus) are rare, however, populations of both species tend to decrease. Very numerous small rodents. For example, in forests there are many bank vole (Myodes glareolus), wetlands are dominated by short-tailed vole (Microtus agrestis), in open spaces - common vole (Microtus arvalis), yellow-necked mouse (Apodemus flavicollis), and striped field mouse (Apodemus agrarius). The Eurasian beaver (Castor fiber) also prospers in Krustkalni and successfully breeds there.

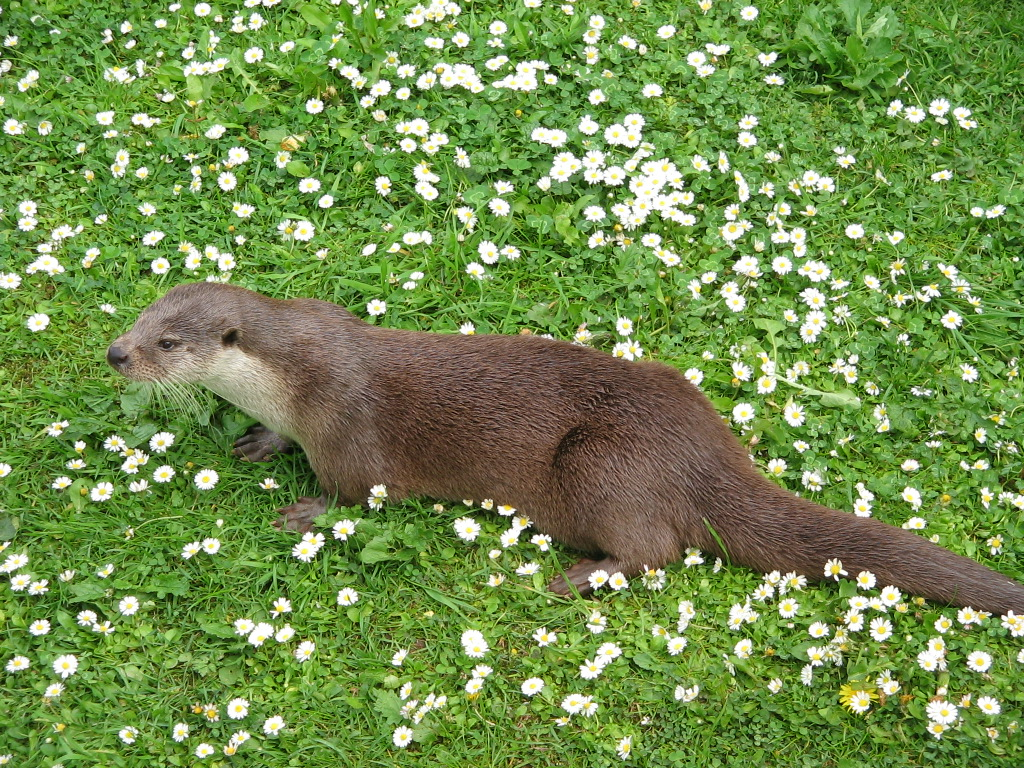
River otter

The forests are also a refuge for various predators. In particular, there are numerous species of least weasel (Mustela nivalis), European polecat (Mustela putorius), and stoat (Mustela erminea). There are stable populations Eurasian otter (Lutra lutra), red fox (Vulpes vulpes) and European pine marten (Martes martes). European badgers (Meles meles) and raccoon dogs (Nyctereutes procyonoides) are quite numerous, they displace badgers from their lairs. Similarly, under the influence of American mink (Neovison vison), the population European mink (Mustela lutreola) is slowly declining. Territory of the reserve are regularly visited by one or two Eurasian lynxes (Lynx lynx).

Of the four species of ungulates in the forests of the reserve, the most common are moose (Alces alces) and wild boar (Sus scrofa), but the population European roe deer (Capreolus capreolus) is also large. Its condition largely depends on wintering conditions. In addition, the red deer (Cervus elaphus) numbers are also gradually increasing in Krustkalni.

=== Birds ===
Of the 140 species of birds found in the reserve, 107 species have been nesting. Given the prevalence of forest biocenoses, the dominant species in this area are small sparrows. Most often seen are the European robin (Erithacus rubecula), common chiffchaff (Phylloscopus collybita), wood warbler (Phylloscopus sibilatrix) and willow warbler (Phylloscopus trochilus), and in some areas dominated by willow tit (Poecile montanus), great tit (Parus major), European pied flycatcher (Ficedula hypoleuca). However, many species of birds are confined to certain habitats. For example, only in coniferous forests it is possible to observe spotted nutcracker (Nucifraga caryocatactes), crested tit (Lophophanes cristatus), red-breasted flycatcher (Ficedula parva), goldcrest (Regulus regulus), dunnock (Prunella modularis), song thrush (Turdus philomelos) and redwing (Turdus iliacus), yellowhammer (Emberiza citrinella), etc. It nests exclusively on the edges and clearings European nightjar (Caprimulgus europaeus). The owners of deciduous forests are garden warbler (Sylvia borin), spotted flycatcher (Muscicapa striata), common linnet (Linaria cannabina).

The avifauna of open biocenoses is more reminiscent of the steppes and meadows of the south. Among the grasses arrange their nests Eurasian skylark (Alauda arvensis), whinchat (Saxicola rubetra), meadow pipit (Anthus pratensis), northern wheatear (Oenanthe oenanthe), northern lapwing (Vanellus vanellus), western yellow wagtail (Motacilla flava) and white wagtail (Motacilla alba). To some extent, this group also includes synanthropic species, which tend to human habitation. In particular, near the buildings in the reserve were seen house sparrow (Passer domesticus) and Eurasian tree sparrow (Passer montanus), barn swallow (Hirundo rustica) and common house martin (Delichon urbicum), Eurasian collared dove (Streptopelia decaocto).

In autumn, only 50 species of birds remain in the reserve for the winter. These are not only sparrows (great and long-tailed tits, field and house sparrows, European greenfinch (Chloris chloris), Eurasian siskin (Spinus spinus), brown-headed nuthatches, and willow tits), but also representatives of other series, in particular, northern goshawk (Accipiter gentilis), black woodpecker (Dryocopus martius), lesser spotted woodpecker (Dryobates minor) and great spotted woodpecker (Dendrocopos major). At this time, crows become very noticeable: western jackdaw (Coloeus monedula), Eurasian magpie (Pica pica), common raven (Corvus corax), hooded crow (Corvus cornix).

Birds of prey in the reserve, although not represented by too many species, but have stable populations. Of the diurnal predators, the most common are common buzzard (Buteo buteo) and the northern goshawk, slightly smaller Eurasian sparrowhawk (Accipiter nisus). From the surrounding areas to hunt for the reserve is often visited Eurasian hobby (Falco subbuteo). Of the nocturnal predators in the forests, tawny owl (Strix aluco) and long-eared owl (Asio otus) regularly nest. In addition to them, Eurasian pygmy owl (Glaucidium passerinum), boreal owl (Aegolius funereus) and Ural owl (Strix uralensis) were observed here.

Chicken birds are represented by such species as black grouse (Lyrurus tetrix), hazel grouse (Tetrastes bonasia) and grey partridge (Perdix perdix). But if the first two species in the reserve feel good, nest annually and even to some extent dominate in winter, the gray partridge suffers from the use of fertilizers and pesticides in the surrounding fields. Another species that is vulnerable for the same reason is corn crake (Crex crex). Waterfowl and waterfowl, tied to water bodies that are virtually unvisited by outsiders, do not experience anthropogenic pressure. On the lakes of the reserve there are numerous Eurasian coot (Fulica atra), mallard (Anas platyrhynchos), common moorhen (Gallinula chloropus), great crested grebe (Podiceps cristatus), garganey (Spatula querquedula) and Eurasian teal (Anas crecca) . The grey heron (Ardea cinerea) and black stork (Ciconia nigra) regularly come here for feeding, although the latter species is quite rare. During migrations in the reserve, large flocks of common crane (Grus grus) (single individuals remain for nesting), taiga bean goose (Anser fabalis) and greylag goose (Anser anser) stop for rest.

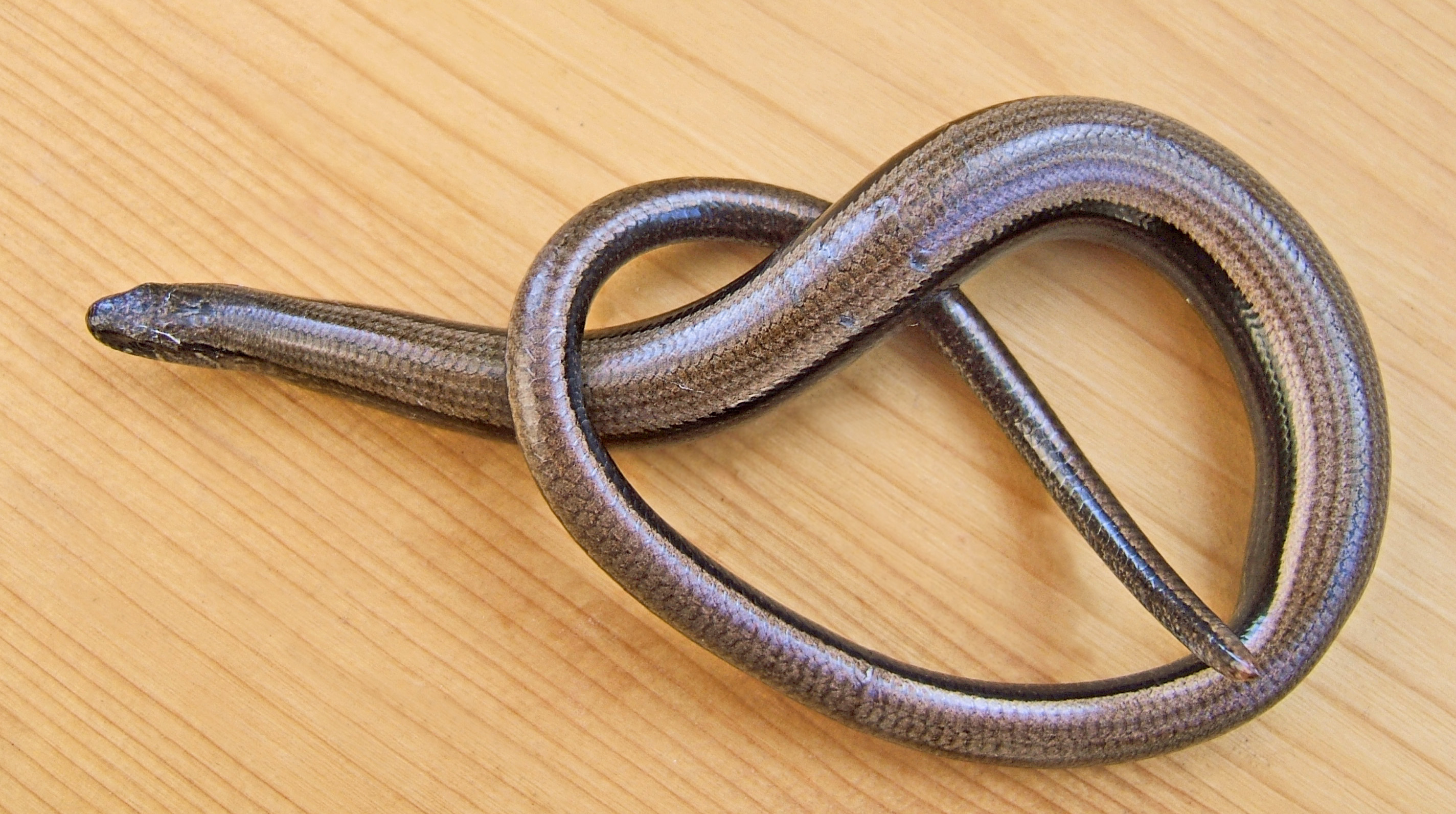
The slow worm, which is rare in the reserve, despite looking like a snake is actually a legless lizard.

=== Reptiles ===
Of the five species of reptiles, Krustkalni has the largest population of viviparous lizard (Zootoca vivipara), as well as many common European vipers (Vipera berus). The sand lizards (Lacerta agilis) prefer the dry edges of pine forests, while the grass snakes (Natrix natrix) tend to like water bodies. Only the slow worm (Anguis fragilis) is a rare reptile of the observed species.

=== Amphibians ===
The most numerous species of amphibians in the reserve are the moor frog (Rana arvalis), followed by the pool frog (Pelophylax lessonae), common frog (Rana temporaria) and marsh frog (Pelophylax ridibundus), as well as the common toad (Bufo bufo). In the spring smooth newts appear in the rivers, but at other times of the year they are inconspicuous.

=== Fish ===
The most numerous species of fish in protected lakes are predators, including the European perch (Perca fluviatilis) and northern pike (Esox lucius). There is also a lot of their prey, such as the tench (Tinca tinca), common roach (Rutilus rutilus) and white bream (Blicca bjoerkna). The ponds formed on the site of the former quarries are dominated by carp: crucian carp (Carassius carassius), common bleak (Alburnus alburnus), European chub (Squalius cephalus), and sunbleak (Leucaspius delineatus). Eurasian minnows (Phoxinus) and gudgeon (Gobio gobio) live in the rapid springs. Experimental catches made in small rivers also found stone loach (Barbatula barbatula), burbot (Lota lota) and weatherfish (Misgurnus fossilis).

=== Insects ===
About 400 species of insects and 12 species of spiders have been found in the reserve. There are many tiny Protura and springtails (Collembola) in the forest litter. The most numerous species of dragonfly is Aeshna grandis, the lakes commonly host beautiful demoiselle (Calopteryx virgo), and Calopteryx splendens flies over rivers. Just a few Orthoptera species have been found: Gryllotalpa gryllotalpa distributed on the edges, and Tettigoniidae (Chorthippus) inhabit meadows and bushes. In contrast, Krustkalni has a very large variety of beetles. There are 15 species of ground beetles in the reserve, the most common being Carabus granulatus, Carabus nemoralis, and Carabus arcensis. In different types of forests live beetles, which feed on corpses. These are members of the genus Nicrophorus (Silphidae). There are relatively many longhorn beetles (Cerambycidae) and leaf beetles (Chrysomelidae) in the forests. It is not difficult to find whirligig beetles (Gyrinidae) and great diving beetles (Dytiscus marginalis) in the lakes. In addition, in the lakes are numerous other insects, such as predatory backswimmers (Notonecta), water striders (Gerridae), caddisflies, whose larvae play an important role in the diet of some fish, and mayflies, whose mass flight is observed on Lake Dreimaņa every year in late spring.

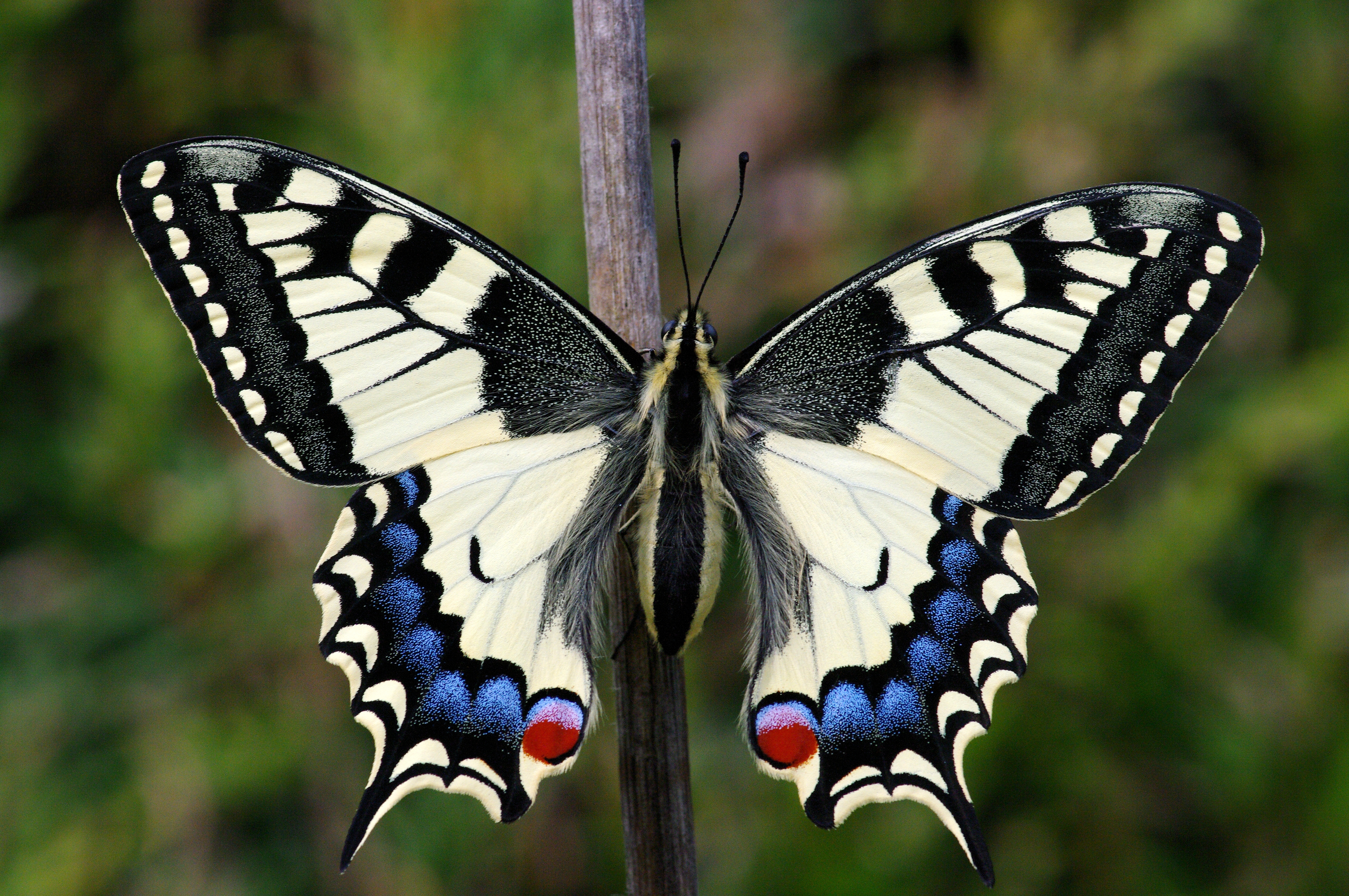
Old World swallowtail

In addition to beetles, the second largest group of insects is Lepidoptera. 48 species of butterflies from 12 families have been described in the reserve, of which 28 are day and 20 are nocturnal. Among the diurnal species common are European peacock (Aglais io), mourning cloak (Nymphalis antiopa), several species of Pieridae, and a typical moth can be considered Ematurga atomaria. Of the two-winged very common Tachinidae, hoverfly, Cecidomyiidae, crane fly (Tipulidae), horse-fly. Hymenoptera are very useful for the ecosystems of the reserve, of which wasps, bumblebees and wild bees act as pollinators of plants, and ants (first of all Formica polyctena and Formica rufa) and parasitoid wasps regulate the number of tree parasites.

Scientists of the reserve pay special attention to the protection of rare species: the turuna Carabus violaceus (found only once), the butterfly Lycaena dispar, whose flight was observed only near the village of Liaudona, the scarlet tiger moth (Callimorpha dominula) can be found on the north-western border of the range, and the Old World swallowtail (Papilio machaon) can be found on the northern border of the range.

=== Invertebrates ===
Of the other invertebrates in the reserve, only the population studied was the European crayfish (Astacus astacus).

== Scientific and economic activity ==
Krustkalni attracted the attention of scientists in the 19th century. In 1895, the botanist A. Rapp compiled a list of local flora, which already included 417 species of plants found on the outskirts of Liaudona. Since the 1940s, floristic research in Krustkalni has been conducted regularly by students University of Latvia. In 1972, a thorough study of local mosses was carried out by bryologist A. Abolin, and in 1976 the baton was taken over by the famous florist A. Rasinsh. Based on the results of these studies, it was decided to grant this area the status of a reserve in order to preserve unique habitats and their inherent diversity of plants. After the creation of the reserve, research on its territory was conducted by employees of the Teiči Reserves and, to some extent, Slītere National Park.

There is a strict protection regime on the territory of the reserve, which prohibits any economic activity: felling of trees, mining, hunting, harvesting of vegetable raw materials, introduced species, etc. Two public roads pass directly through the reserve, and its borders are adjacent to agricultural lands. Visiting the reserve by outsiders, even as part of excursion groups, is prohibited, with special permission, only scientists can do it.
