= Ļaudona =

Village in Latvia

Ļaudona german: Laudohn
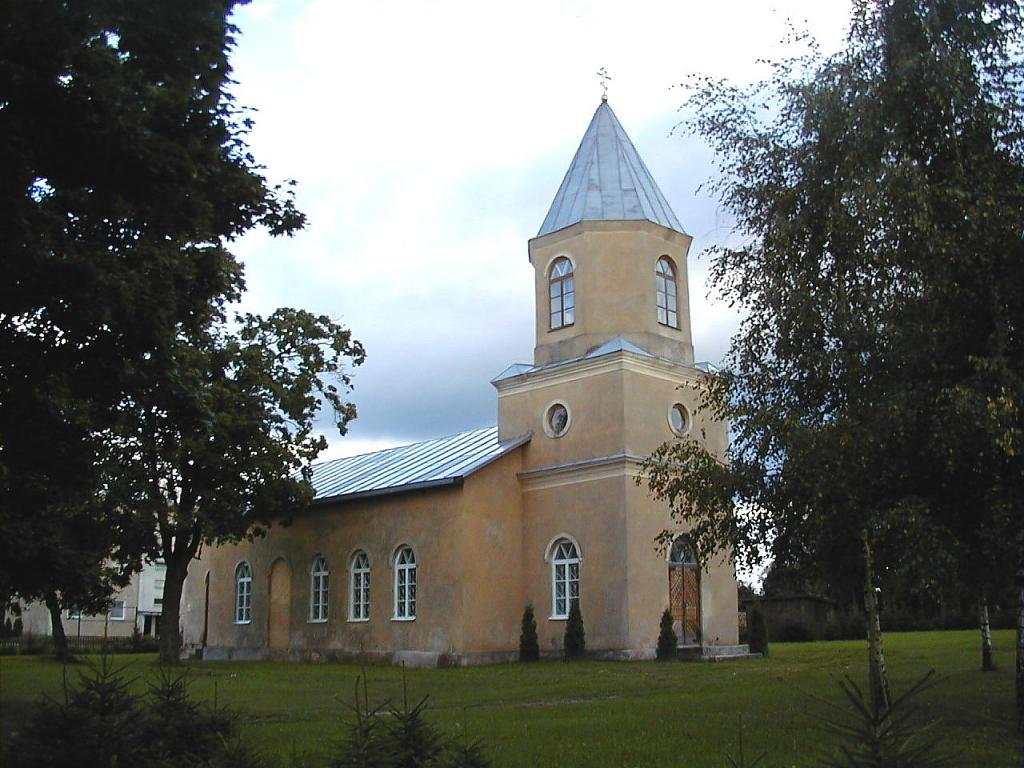
- Parish church

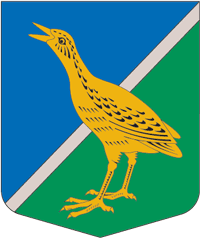
- Coat of arms

- Location within Latvia
- Coordinates: 56°42′0″N 26°11′0″E
- Country: Latvia
- Municipality: Madona
- Parish: Ļaudona Parish
- Website: www.laudona.lv

Ļaudona (German: Laudohn) is a village in the Ļaudona Parish of Madona Municipality in the Vidzeme region of Latvia. The Ļaudona Parish of the former Madona district was merged into the municipality (novads) of Madona in 2009.

== History of Ļaudona ==
The historical Latgalian stronghold on the Aiviekste River was rebuilt as a fortress by the Archbishop of Riga in 1274 and used for trade and military purpose. The Laudohn noble family, then vassals of Archbishop Henning Scharpenberg, acquired the manor of Toce (Tootzen) in 1432. The archbishop's castle had been destroyed in the 16th century Livonian War. With Livonia, Ļaudona was conquered by King Gustavus Adolphus of Sweden by the 1629 Truce of Altmark, and upon the 1721 Treaty of Nystad belonged to the Russian Empire.

The famous Austrian Field Marshal Ernst Gideon von Laudon was born here in 1717.
