= Raivis Broks =

Latvian bobsledder (born 1984)

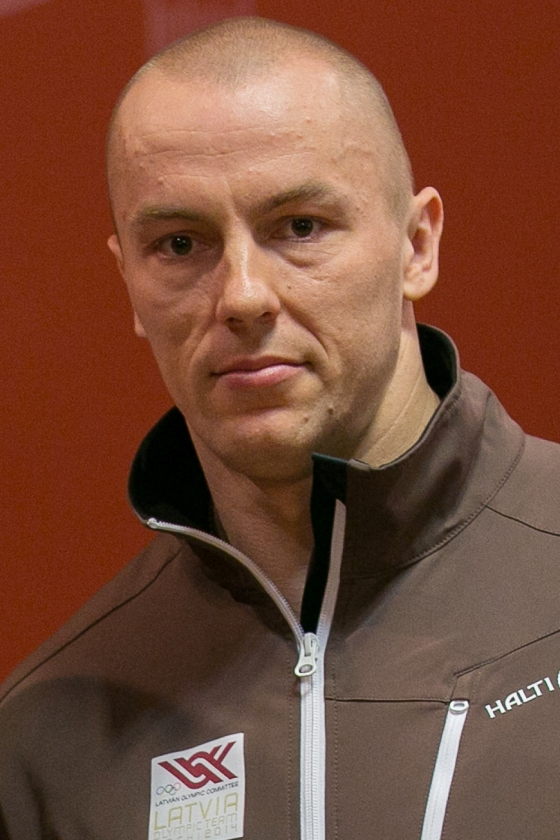
Raivis Broks in 2014

Raivis Broks (born February 20, 1984, in Madona) is a Latvian bobsledder who has competed since 2007. His best finish at the FIBT World Championships was 15th in the four-man event at Altenberg, Germany in 2008.

Broks also finished 11th in the four-man event at the 2010 Winter Olympics in Vancouver.
