= Ļaudona Parish =

Parish of Latvia

- parish of Latvia
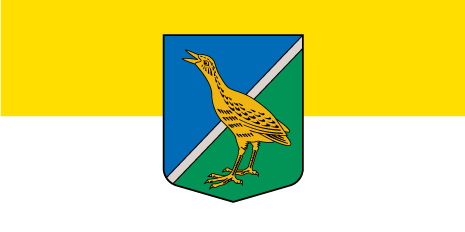
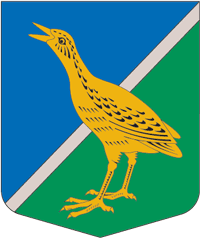
- Flag Coat of arms

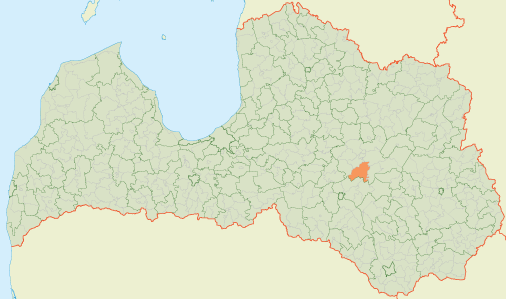
- Coordinates: 56°41′29″N 26°09′58″E
- Country: Latvia
- Website: https://www.laudona.lv/

Ļaudona Parish (Latvian: Ļaudonas pagasts) is an administrative unit of Madona Municipality in the Vidzeme region of Latvia. Until 2009, it was part of the defunct Madona district.

== Towns, villages and settlements of Ļaudona parish ==
- Ļaudona
