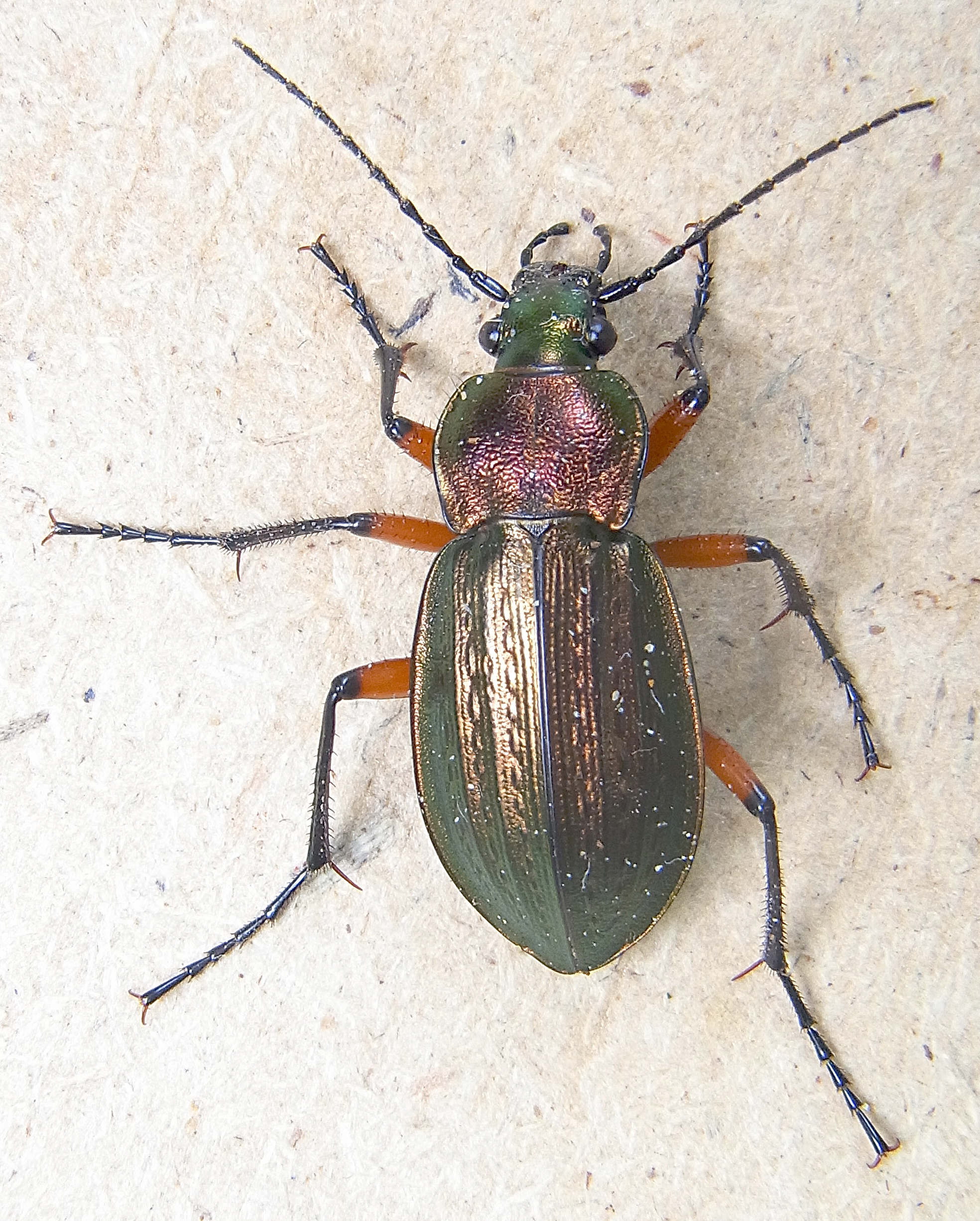

Scientific classification
- Kingdom: Animalia
- Phylum: Arthropoda
- Class: Insecta
- Order: Coleoptera
- Suborder: Adephaga
- Family: Carabidae
- Subfamily: Carabinae
- Tribe: Carabini
- Genus: Carabus
- Species: C. arcensis

Binomial name
- Carabus arcensis Herbst, 1784

= Carabus arcensis =

Species of beetle

Carabus arcensis is a species of ground beetle in the family Carabidae. It is found in the Palearctic.

Subspecies Carabus arcensis arcensis is described as "a large granulate bronze or green ground beetle with a body length of 16-20 mm," and is found throughout the Palearctic.

== Subspecies ==
These 11 subspecies belong to the species Carabus arcensis:

- Carabus arcensis arcensis Herbst, 1784
- Carabus arcensis baschkiricus Breuning, 1932 (Russia)
- Carabus arcensis conciliator Fischer von Waldheim, 1820 (Kazakhstan, Mongolia, and Russia)
- Carabus arcensis eremita Fischer von Waldheim, 1823
- Carabus arcensis faldermanni Dejean, 1830 (China, North Korea, and Russia)
- Carabus arcensis florianiellus Obydov & Saldaitis, 2008 (China)
- Carabus arcensis kargiensis Obydov, 2008 (Russia)
- Carabus arcensis klitini Obydov, 2007 (Russia)
- Carabus arcensis sachalinensis Lapouge, 1906 (Japan and Russia)
- Carabus arcensis sylvaticus Dejean, 1826 (Europe)
- Carabus arcensis venetianus Bernau, 1914 (Europe)
