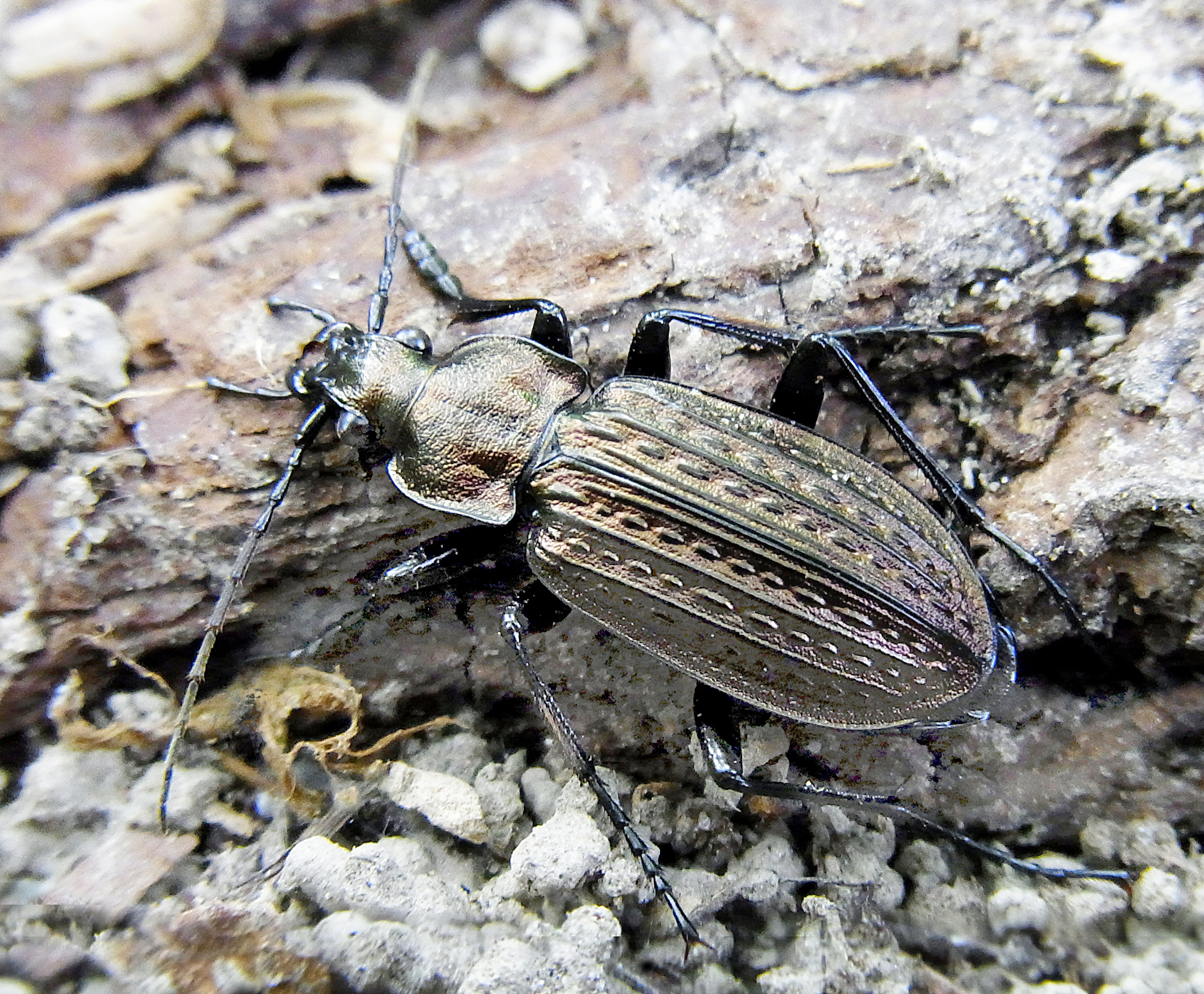
- Carabus granulatus male

Scientific classification
- Kingdom: Animalia
- Phylum: Arthropoda
- Class: Insecta
- Order: Coleoptera
- Suborder: Adephaga
- Family: Carabidae
- Genus: Carabus
- Species: C. granulatus

Binomial name
- Carabus granulatus Linnaeus, 1758

Synonyms
- Carabus ponti Csiki, 1927; Carabus ponticus Lapouge, 1925; Carabus corticalis Motschulsky, 1844; Carabus luctisonus Csiki, 1927; Carabus luctuosus Lapouge, 1925; Carabus lenensis Poppius, 1906; Carabus cupriculus Reitter, 1896; Carabus solskyanus Géhin, 1885; Carabus dauricus Solsky, 1875; Carabus songoricus Motschulsky, 1850; Carabus elongatus Fischer von Waldheim, 1842; Carabus atrocyanescens Lamy, 1973; Carabus atrocyaneus Lamy, 1973; Carabus hibernicus Lindroth, 1956; Carabus granulatulus Mandl, 1955; Carabus crimeensis Breuning, 1933; Carabus hudsonicus Lapouge, 1925; Carabus wimmeli Schulz, 1900; Carabus fulvipes Géhin, 1885; Carabus forticostis Kraatz, 1878; Carabus haematomerus Kraatz, 1878; Carabus parvicollis Kraatz, 1878; Carabus cupreoaeneus Dalla Torre, 1877; Carabus nigroaeneus Dalla Torre, 1877; Carabus rubripes Dalla Torre, 1877; Carabus viridiaeneus Dalla Torre, 1877; Carabus rubripes Géhin, 1876; Carabus niger Letzner, 1850; Carabus nigrescens Letzner, 1850; Carabus rufofemoratus Letzner, 1850; Carabus virescens Letzner, 1850; Carabus parallelus Faldermann, 1836; Carabus confluens Fischer von Waldheim, 1828; Carabus campestris M.Adams, 1817; Buprestis chalybea Voet, 1778; Carabus corsicus Born, 1906; Carabus paludicola G.Müller, 1903; Carabus miridita Apfelbeck, 1901; Carabus debilicostis Kraatz, 1878; Carabus aetolicus Schaum, 1857; Carabus palustris Dejean, 1826; Carabus maoershanensis Li, 1992; Carabus gobiensis Lapouge, 1925; Carabus ussuriensis Born, 1914; Carabus expansus Lapouge, 1905; Carabus pekinensis Fairmaire, 1887; Carabus karafutensis Csiki, 1927; Carabus praedator Lapouge, 1925; Carabus sachalinensis Matsumura, 1911

= Carabus granulatus =

Species of beetle

Carabus granulatus, common name granulated ground beetle, is a species of beetle. It is found across the Palearctic from Ireland to the Russian Far East and has been introduced to North America. It is widespread in Europe. C. granulatus lives in fields, prairies, taiga and in forests. Also along river margins, in fens, lakeshores, and upland peat. It is occasional in gardens.

== Description ==
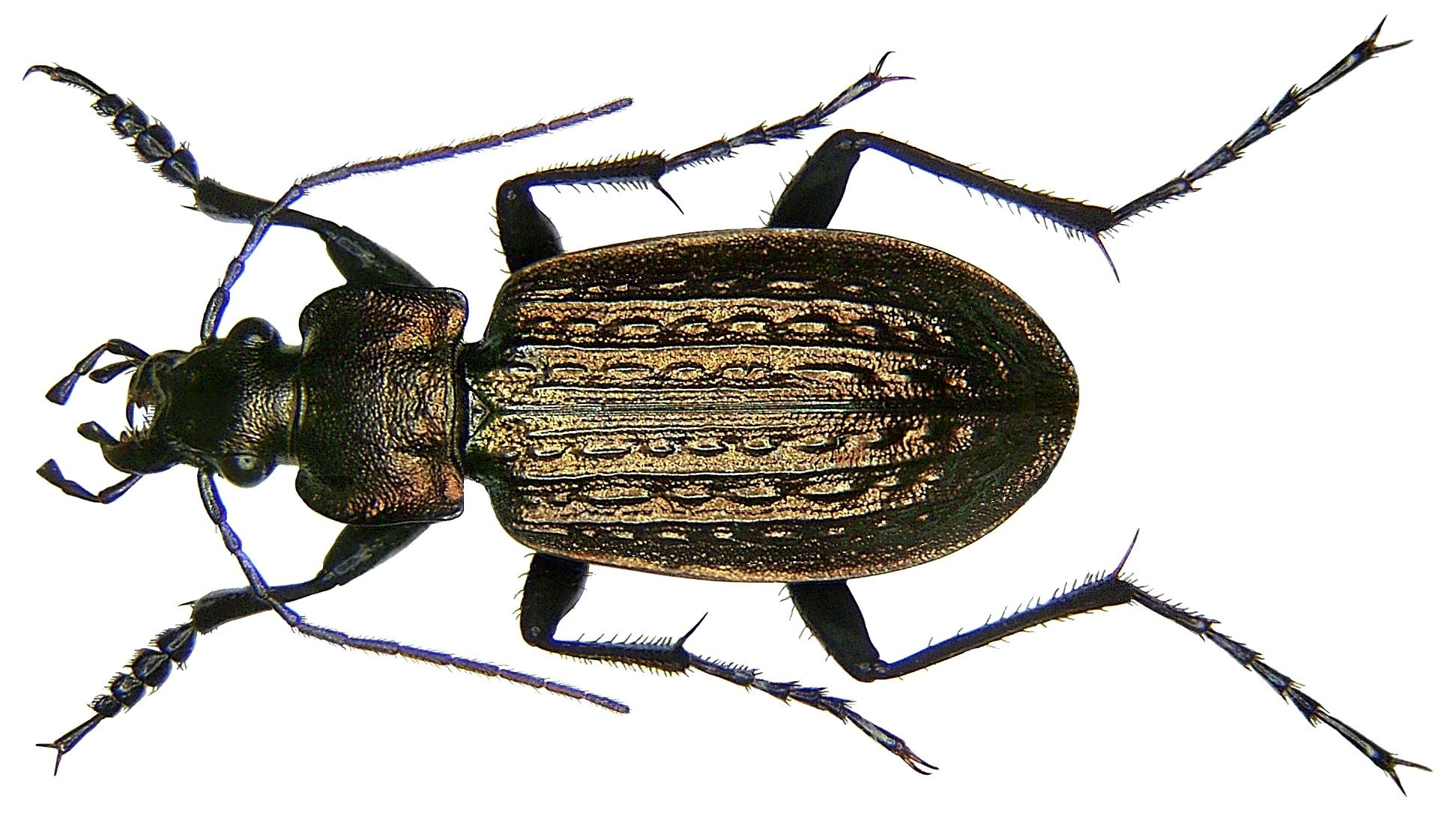
Photo showing the "chain links"

It is a small Carabus (length between 14 and 20 mm), winged and characterized by an elongated body which is not very convex and an enlarged thorax. The antennae and the legs are black, the upper part of the animal shiny, predominantly greenish bronze, green or occasionally black. The elytra are subparallel with "chain link" (longitudinal grooves with granules).

== Biology ==
Carabus granulatus is one of the very few species of ground beetles that have not completely lost their ability to fly, only the mountain forms are short-winged. Nevertheless, the nocturnal animals generally remain on the ground, where they prey on insects, worms and snails. During the day they hide under tree trunks or stones. From autumn to spring, the animals often spend the winter together in tree stumps. The females lay about forty eggs. The larvae moult three times before pupating in the ground. The adult beetles hatch in autumn.

== Subspecies ==
- Carabus granulatus calabricus Spettoli & Vigna Taglianti, 2001 (Italy)
- Carabus granulatus daghestanicus Lapouge, 1925 (Georgia, Azerbaijan, Russia)
- Carabus granulatus duarius Fischer von Waldheim, 1844 (Kazakhstan, Kyrgyzstan, China, Russia, Mongolia)
- Carabus granulatus granulatus Linnaeus, 1758 (Ireland, Great Britain, Denmark, Norway, Sweden, Finland, France, Belgium, Netherlands, Germany, Switzerland, Austria, Czechia, Slovakia, Hungary, Poland, Estonia, Latvia, Lithuania, Belarus, Ukraine, Spain, Slovenia, Croatia, Bosnia-Herzegovina, former Yugoslavia, Bulgaria, Romania, Moldova, Turkey, USA, Canada, Russia)
- Carabus granulatus interstitialis Duftschmid, 1812 (France, Austria, Corsica, Italy, Croatia, Bosnia-Herzegovina, North Macedonia, Albania, Greece, Moldova, Turkey)
- Carabus granulatus leander Kraatz, 1878 (Georgia, Russia)
- Carabus granulatus telluris Bates, 1883 (China, North Korea, Japan, Russia, Mongolia)
- Carabus granulatus yezoensis Bates, 1883 (Japan, Russia)
