= Madona =

Town and capital of Madona Municipality, Latvia

- Town
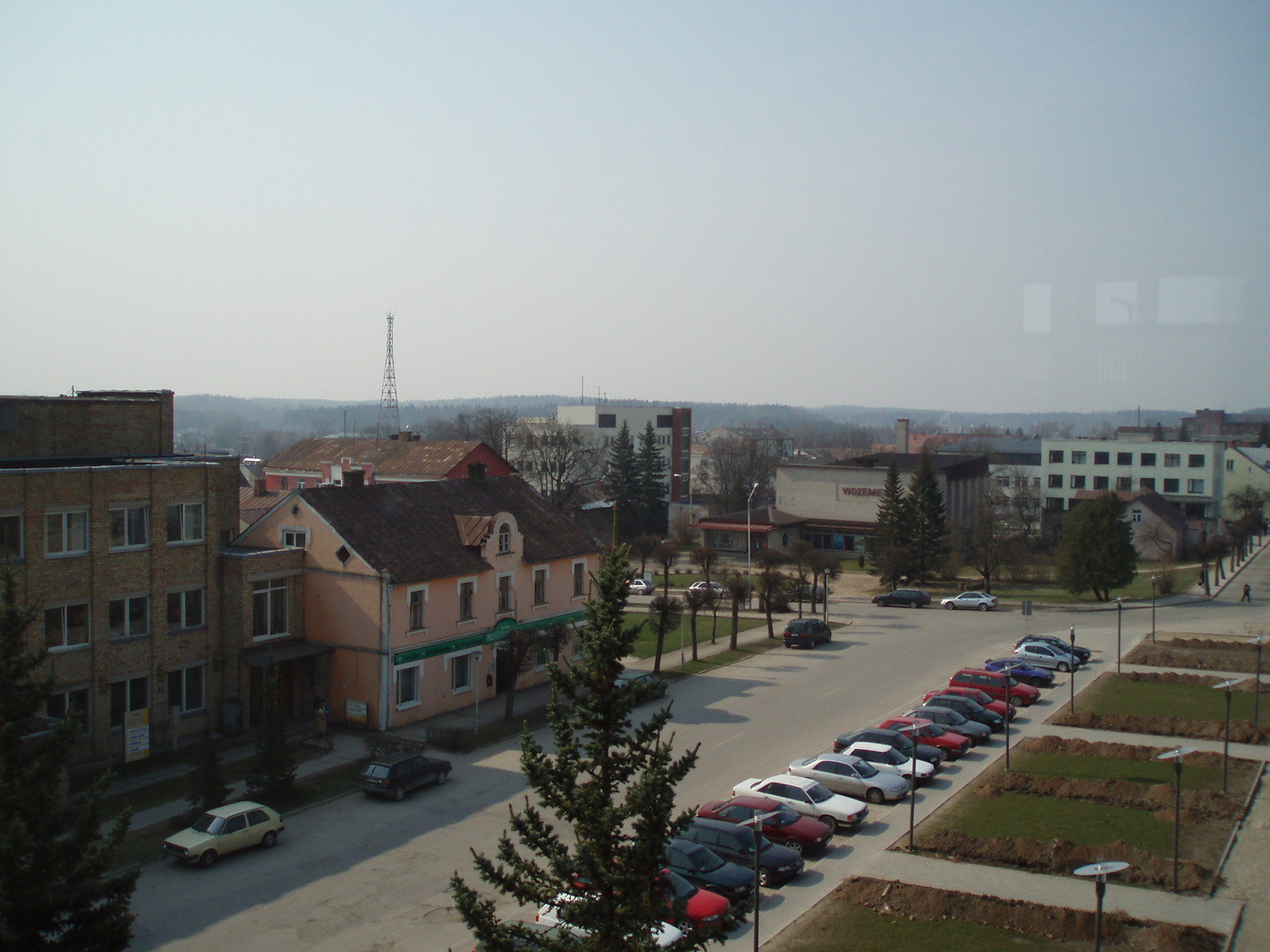
- Madona skyline

- Flag Coat of arms

- Location in Latvia
- Coordinates: 56°51′15″N 26°13′14″E
- Country: Latvia
- District: Madona Municipality
- Town rights: 1926

Government
  - Council Chairman: Agris Lungevičs

Area
  - Total: 10.41 km^{2} (4.02 sq mi)
  - Land: 9.94 km^{2} (3.84 sq mi)
  - Water: 0.47 km^{2} (0.18 sq mi)

Population (2026)
  - Total: 6,502
  - Density: 654/km^{2} (1,690/sq mi)
- Time zone: UTC+2 (EET)
  - Summer (DST): UTC+3 (EEST)
- Postal code: LV-4801
- Calling code: +371 648
- Number of city council members: 11
- Website: Madona.lv

Madona (German: Modohn) is a town with town rights in the Vidzeme region of Latvia and is the center of Madona Municipality.

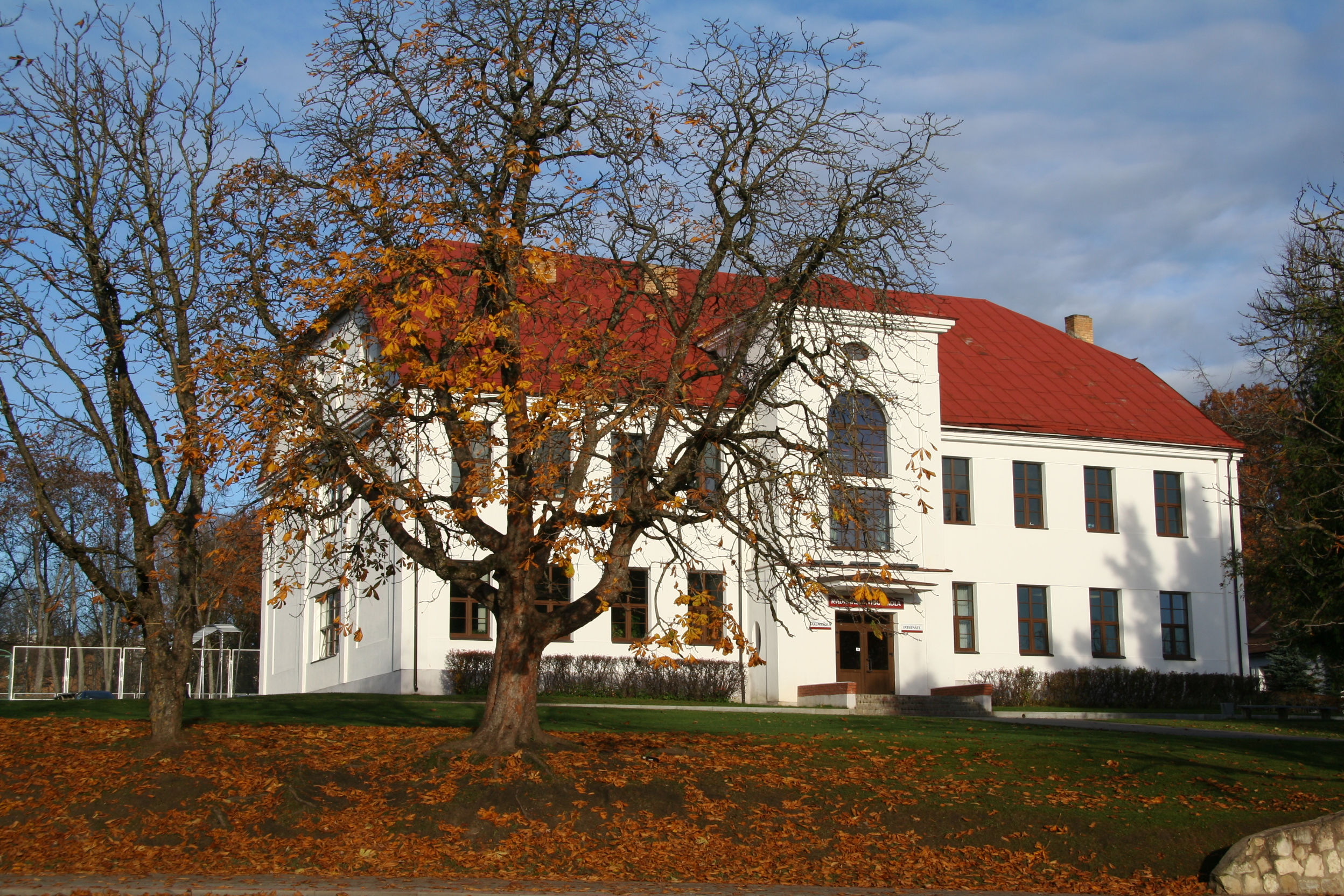
Skola street, Madona

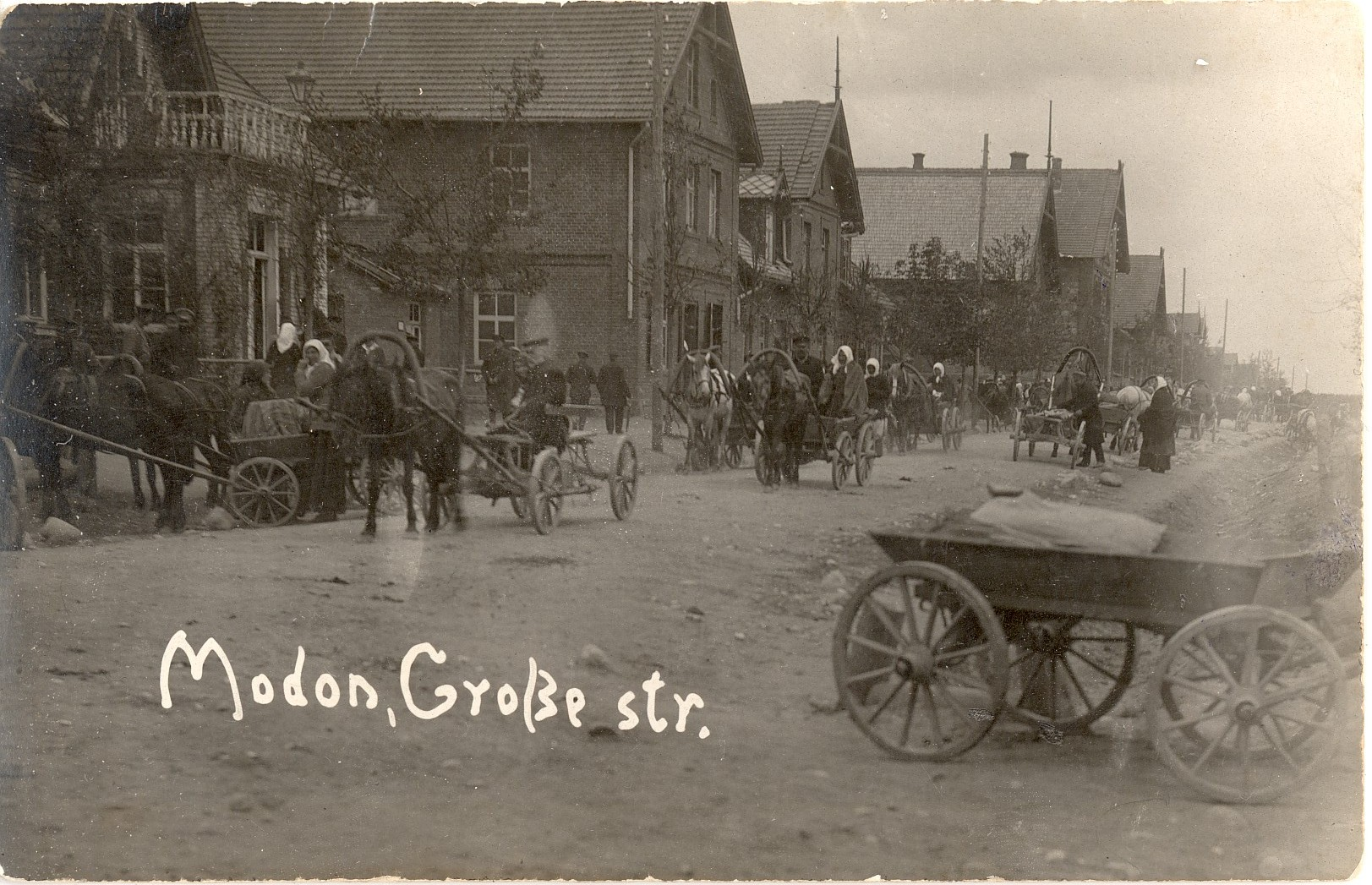
Main street, Madona, in 1918

== History ==
The surrounding area of Madona had been populated in earlier times, which is confirmed by discoveries of old burial grounds in the city's vicinity. Madona is first mentioned in writing in 1461, when Archbishop Sylvester began renting the lands of Birži Manor. However, the Swedish government placed the land under state control. After the Great Northern War, Madona became property of the Russian Empire. Empress Elizabeth presented Birži Manor along with other of Vidzeme's manors to Count Alexander Buturlin.

Empress Catherine II bought the lands back as a present to the Serbian-born General Maxim Zorić. From the 19th to the beginning of the 20th century, the location of Madona was the fields of Birži Manor.

According to one version, the name of Madona stems from the adjacent Madona Lake. According to another version, Madona got its name from Birži Manor, which German exonym is Madohn or Modohn. For this reason, the railway station situated at the Pļaviņas - Valka narrow gauge railway line was named Madona as well. The populated place that slowly emerged around the station also got this name after the erection of the Madona railway station in 1903.

Village privileges was given to Madona 1 July 1921, and town privileges 7 June 1926. Since 1 April 1925 Madona was the center of the newly founded County of Madona (Madonas apriņķis). Madona had 1,357 inhabitants at the time.

During World War II, Madona was under German occupation from 2 July 1941 until 13 August 1944. It was administered as a part of the Generalbezirk Lettland of Reichskommissariat Ostland.

== Population ==
The Latvian Central Statistics Department reported 9,242 citizens as of 1 January 2007, with 888 people per square kilometre (2,300 people/mi^{2})s).

Demographic situation in Madona
| Latvians | 79% |
| Russians | 16% |
| Belarusians | 1.79% |
| Ukrainians | 1% |
| Poles | 0.89% |
| Others | 1.32% |

When it comes to age distribution of the Madona inhabitants, the majority group consisting of 5,925 people are registered as "labour-capable" (Latvian: darbaspējīgie); 1,339 are under the age of "labour-capability" and 1867 are over. As of 21 December 2003, there were 211 (3.5%) unemployed citizens of the labour force.

== Geography ==
The town of Madona lies in Vidzeme Upland. The hilly surroundings descend in a northwestern-southeastern direction. Several minor rivers and streams flows through the town, such as: Lisa River, Leivārīte, Ridzīte, Mucenieki River, Rieba River and Madona River — which flows can be seen in beautiful glens, like: The Love Glen, The Wedding Glen and The Divorce Glen. In The Love Glen is a park, in which the manmade water reservoir has one of the highest fountains in Latvia.

=== Climate ===
Madona has a humid continental climate (Köppen Dfb).

Climate data for Madona (1991-2020 normals, extremes 1971-present)
| Month | Jan | Feb | Mar | Apr | May | Jun | Jul | Aug | Sep | Oct | Nov | Dec | Year |
|---|---|---|---|---|---|---|---|---|---|---|---|---|---|
| Record high °C (°F) | 9.5 (49.1) | 11.0 (51.8) | 17.5 (63.5) | 28.0 (82.4) | 29.8 (85.6) | 33.2 (91.8) | 34.0 (93.2) | 33.2 (91.8) | 30.0 (86.0) | 21.4 (70.5) | 14.0 (57.2) | 11.0 (51.8) | 34.0 (93.2) |
| Mean daily maximum °C (°F) | −1.9 (28.6) | −1.3 (29.7) | 3.6 (38.5) | 11.5 (52.7) | 17.6 (63.7) | 21.1 (70.0) | 23.4 (74.1) | 22.1 (71.8) | 16.4 (61.5) | 9.3 (48.7) | 3.2 (37.8) | −0.3 (31.5) | 10.4 (50.7) |
| Daily mean °C (°F) | −4.5 (23.9) | −4.5 (23.9) | −0.5 (31.1) | 6.0 (42.8) | 11.5 (52.7) | 15.3 (59.5) | 17.6 (63.7) | 16.2 (61.2) | 11.3 (52.3) | 5.6 (42.1) | 0.9 (33.6) | −2.5 (27.5) | 6.0 (42.9) |
| Mean daily minimum °C (°F) | −7.4 (18.7) | −8.1 (17.4) | −4.8 (23.4) | 0.3 (32.5) | 4.9 (40.8) | 9.2 (48.6) | 12.0 (53.6) | 10.4 (50.7) | 6.3 (43.3) | 1.9 (35.4) | −1.5 (29.3) | −4.9 (23.2) | 1.5 (34.7) |
| Record low °C (°F) | −33.1 (−27.6) | −33.0 (−27.4) | −25.4 (−13.7) | −12.4 (9.7) | −6.0 (21.2) | −0.3 (31.5) | 1.5 (34.7) | 2.3 (36.1) | −4.6 (23.7) | −12.5 (9.5) | −23.0 (−9.4) | −35.7 (−32.3) | −35.7 (−32.3) |
| Average precipitation mm (inches) | 58.3 (2.30) | 46.1 (1.81) | 42.1 (1.66) | 37.8 (1.49) | 57.1 (2.25) | 73.4 (2.89) | 67.4 (2.65) | 68.4 (2.69) | 55.7 (2.19) | 72.7 (2.86) | 62.1 (2.44) | 57.0 (2.24) | 698.1 (27.47) |
| Average precipitation days (≥ 1 mm) | 13 | 10 | 9 | 8 | 9 | 10 | 10 | 10 | 9 | 12 | 11 | 12 | 123 |
Source 1: LVĢMC
Source 2: NOAA (precipitation days 1991-2020)

== Notable locations and objects ==
- Madona City Museum — founded in 1944, the museum owns more than 107,000 historical items, it is located in historical Birži Manor.
- The Love Glen (Latvian: Mīlestības grava). Through The Love Glen flows the Madona River, along which shores slings park footpaths. At the entrance a pond with a fountain can be found.
- Madona Second High School — first three-storey building in Madona, built 1924–26.
- Former hotel building — among the oldest buildings in town, built 1901 of boulders and bricks.
- Lazdona Lutheran Church — built 1802–05, inaugurated 1806.
- Lazdona Holy Trinity Orthodox Church — built 1863–66.
- Madona Catholic Church — built 1931–34.

== Tourism ==
Madona is 170 km east from Latvian capital Riga. Most popular tourism objects in Madona and surrounding are:

- Gaizinkalns hill. Gaizinkalns is the highest point of Latvia. It is 311.94 m above sea level. Visitors can take a walk for the 2 km long walking trail with beautiful views. Hill surrounding has evolved winter sports offer - comfortable skiing centers and accommodation.
- Teiči and Krustkalni nature reserves. The aim of these reserves is to provide ecosystems protection and natural development. There is an opportunity for tourists with a guide to see these protected nature territories and use birds watchtower. The total area of the Teiči reserve is 19,779 ha.
- Kalsnava Arboretum - largest collection of decorative trees and bushes in eastern part of Latvia, with total area of 130,37 ha.
- Lake Lubāns - the part of largest lake in Latvia is in Madona district. Allowed activities next to the lake are fishing, swimming, using bird-watching tower, renting a telescope and a bike.
- Interesting farms for tourists - 13 farms are open: rabbits and goats farm "Sveki", goat farm "Līvi", "Kucuru mill", farm "Ataugas".
- Winter sports and recreation centers: sport center "Smeceres sils", located next to Madona. There were organized some international biathlon and cross-country skiing competitions (Scandinavian Cup 2013 and World-cup Ski-Orienteering Competition 2013). Also, there are: recreation center "Gaizins", skiing center "Viešūra kalns", and recreation complex "Rēķu kalns" - alpine skiing, snowboarding, cross-country skiing, the tube-slope.
- Madona local history and art museum, with more than 20 artistic and thematic exhibitions every year.
- Different workshops (arts and crafts) and cultural events.
- Much accommodation.

== Notable people ==
- Leons Briedis (1949 – 2020), poet, novelist, essayist and a literary critic
- Dainis Turlais (born 1950), politician, Minister of the Interior, 1995 – 1997
- Dainis Īvāns (born 1955), journalist and politician
- Indulis Bērziņš (born 1957), politician, Minister of Foreign Affairs, 1999 to 2002.
- Baiba Broka (born 1975), lawyer and politician

=== Sport ===
- Aleksandrs Starkovs (born 1955), football coach, played 417 games for FC Daugava Riga
- Ingus Veips (born 1969), former cyclist, competed in the track time trial at the 1992 Summer Olympics
- Gundars Upenieks (born 1971), biathlete, took part in four Winter Olympics upto 2002 Winter Olympics
- Raivis Zīmelis (born 1976), biathlete, competed at the 2006 Winter Olympics
- Raivis Broks (born 1984), bobsledder, took part in the 2010 Winter Olympics
- Edgars Točs (born 1988), beach volleyball player, participated at the 2020 Summer Olympics
- Raimo Vīgants (born 1999), cross-country skier, competed at the 2022 Winter Olympics

== Twin towns — sister cities ==
Madona is twinned with:

- Anykščiai, Lithuania
- (Georgia (country)) Borjomi, Georgia
- Coulaines, France
- Lahoysk, Belarus
- Mettmann, Germany
- Rapla, Estonia
- Strugi Krasnye, Russia
- Tranås, Sweden
- Weyhe, Germany
