= Constitution of Latvia =

Fundamental law of Latvia

Constitution of Republic of Latvia Latvijas Republikas Satversme
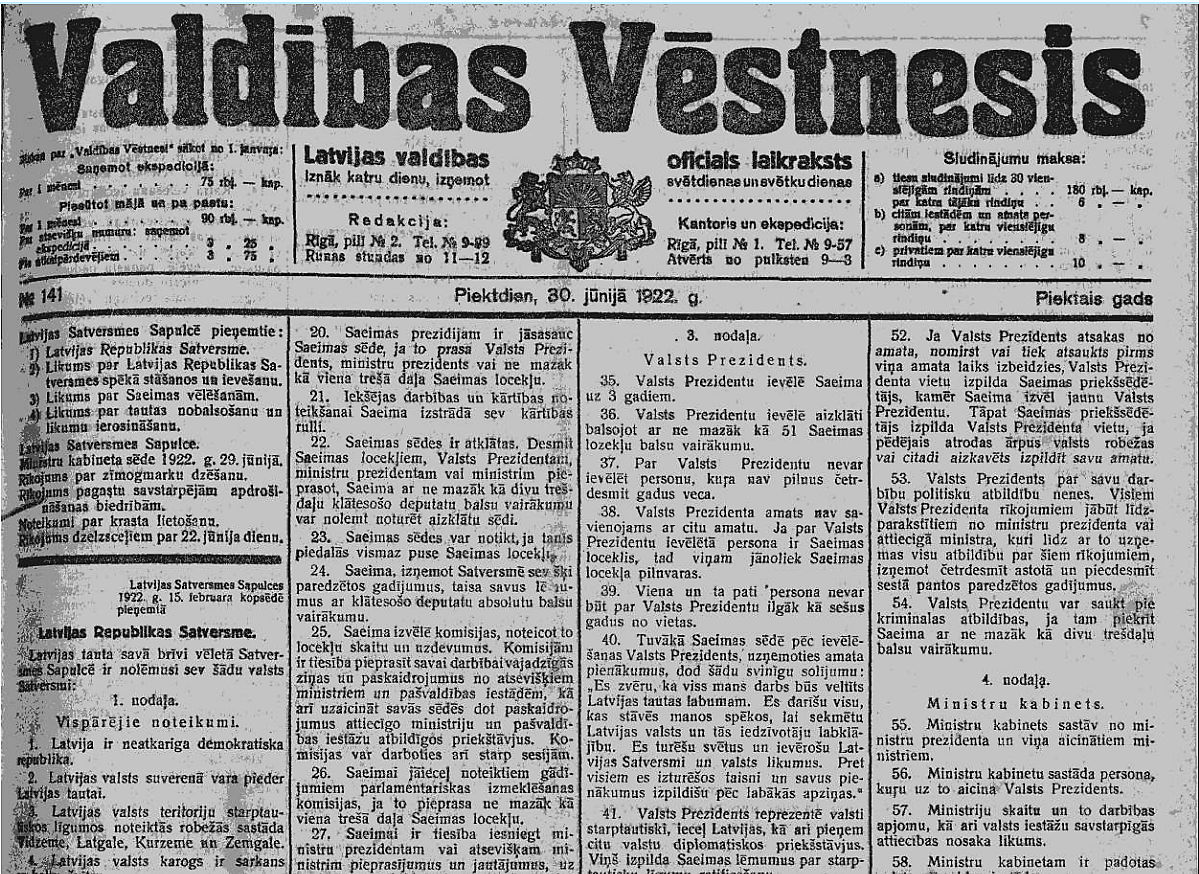
- Constitution of Latvia published in the government newspaper Valdības Vēstnesis on 30 June 1922.

Overview
- Jurisdiction: Latvia
- Created: 15 February 1922
- Date effective: 7 November 1922
- System: Constitutional parliamentary republic
- Chambers: Unicameral
- Executive: Cabinet Ministers
- Judiciary: Supreme, Constitutional

History
- Amendments: 15
- Author: Constitutional Assembly of Latvia
- Signatories: 150

The Constitution of Latvia (Latvian: Satversme, Livonian: Pūojpandõks) is the fundamental law of the Republic of Latvia. The Satversme is the oldest Eastern or Central European constitution still in force and the sixth oldest still-functioning republican basic law in the world. It was adopted, as it states itself in the text, by the people of Latvia, as represented in the Constitutional Assembly of Latvia, on 15 February 1922 and came into force on 7 November 1922. It was heavily influenced by Germany's Weimar Constitution and the Swiss Federal Constitution. The constitution establishes the main bodies of government (Saeima, State President, Cabinet of Ministers, Courts, State Auditor); it consists of 116 articles arranged in eight chapters.

Although the initial text consisted of two parts, the second part - which regulated citizens' rights, freedoms and obligations - failed to pass by just a few votes; the chapter on fundamental human rights was added only by a constitutional amendment in 1998.

After the 1934 Latvian coup d'état by Prime Minister of Latvia Kārlis Ulmanis, Satversme was suspended and government assumed the law-giving functions of the Saeima. This situation continued until June 17, 1940, when the Soviet Union occupied Latvia, destroyed the existing regime, and incorporated the Latvian SSR into the USSR on August 5. A new, Soviet-style constitution was then introduced.

On May 4, 1990 the Supreme Soviet of LSSR passed the declaration On the Restoration of Independence of the Republic of Latvia, declaring the 1940 Soviet annexation of Latvia illegal (as it was done by ignoring Satversme), and therefore the Satversme and Republic of Latvia still existed de jure. Only articles 1, 2, 3 and 6 of Satversme were reintroduced at that time by the declaration; the constitution was fully reintroduced only by the first assembly of the 5th Saeima in 1993.

== Etymology ==
In Latvian, satversme is officially used instead of 'constitution' (konstitūcija), while in everyday conversations "konstitūcija" is often used. The word was created by Atis Kronvalds, one of the leaders of the First Latvian National Awakening in the 19th century. The movement was trying to promote Latvian culture after centuries of Baltic German influence and encourage use of the Latvian language. Kronvalds and like-minded individuals created and introduced many new words and terms intended to be used over Germanic loanwords to modernize Latvian. He derived the term "satversme" from the root -tvert- ("to grip"), combining it with the prefix "sa-", which yields the word satvert (to grasp), adding the -sm- suffix and the feminine ending "-e", creating a word that in its meaning is similar to "holder", to illustrate how a constitution holds together all other laws.

Other examples of the use of the word include the Satversme of the University of Latvia and the Constitution Protection Bureau.

== History ==
The Constitution was drafted by the Constitutional Assembly of Latvia (Satversmes sapulce), which consisted of 150 members (later 152) elected in April 1920 in general elections. The initial text was elaborated by a Constitutional committee (Satversmes komisija) and consisted of two parts. It was influenced by ideas of the Weimar Constitution and the Swiss Federal Constitution. The first regulated the state's institutions; the second, citizens' rights and obligations. The committee presented its work on 20 September 1921. The first part of the bill was passed on 15 February 1922, while the second part on 5 April 1922 received 62 "Yes" votes, 6 "No" votes and 62 abstentions, which were counted as "No", and therefore was not adopted, mostly because Latgale parties were against it. On 20 June 1922 a law was passed that set the new constitution to come into force at 12 a.m. on 7 November 1922.

On 15 May 1934 Latvian coup d'état led by Kārlis Ulmanis took place; the subsequent cabinet of Ulmanis passed a declaration that gave the functions of parliament to the Cabinet of Ministers until a new constitution was to be drafted, which never happened. In 1940 Latvian SSR was established by occupying Soviet Union forces and a parliament called the "People's Saeima of Latvia" was elected. The legality of this parliament and its decisions is questioned–Soviets considered that the constitution was nullified by Ulmanis' coup d'état, so the People's Saeima never formally annulled it. However, Latvian lawyers and historians observe that the constitution was still in effect, since Ulmanis' declaration only assigned the functions of the Saeima to the cabinet and did not cancel any part of the constitution, and that the People's Saeima was elected in accordance with the constitution of Russian SFSR, not in accordance with that of Latvia, and thus it had no legal rights to legislate, and by declaring accession to the Soviet Union, it broke the first article of the Satversme.

After declaring accession to the USSR, the People's Saeima drafted a Constitution of LSSR on the basis of the 1936 Soviet Constitution. It was adopted a month after, on 25 August 1940. On 18 April 1978 the government of the LSSR adopted a new constitution modeled on the 1977 Soviet Constitution.

On 4 May 1990 the Supreme Soviet of LSSR declared restoration of Latvia's independence and adopted articles 1, 2, 3 and 6 of the constitution of 1922. The rest of the constitution remained in abeyance until it was reviewed to fit the modern situation, thus the constitution was fully reinforced by 5th Saeima on 6 July 1993, in accordance to 14 article of law "On organisation of job of Supreme Council of Republic of Latvia". In 1992 neighboring Estonia voted on a new Constitution of Estonia as did Lithuania with Constitution of Lithuania, as their pre-war constitutions had been written and amended during their authoritarian regimes, while Ulmanis regime had not changed anything in the democratic Satversme of 1922.

== Origins ==
Inauguration of the Constitutional Assembly of Latvia, 1 May 1920

Latvia was one of the early post World War I nations which adopted some ideas from the 1919 Weimar Constitution. Liberal lawyer Hugo Preuß (Preuss) is often attributed as the author of the draft version of the constitution that was passed by the Weimar National Assembly, which historian William L. Shirer in a book The Rise and Fall of the Third Reich regards as "the most liberal and democratic document of its kind the twentieth century had ever seen ... full of ingenious and admirable devices which seemed to guarantee the working of an almost flawless democracy.". In Latvia some early law experts such as Kārlis Dišlers, Fēlikss Cielēns and modern day jurists agree that Weimar Constitution was underlying the wording of the Constitution of Latvia (Satversme), and in some way is a synthesis between the Weimar Constitution and Westminster system used in the United Kingdom.

Some similarities between Weimar Constitution and Latvian are:

- The establishment of state institutions of the Weimar Republic and the Republic of Latvia, which began with the establishment of a pre-parliament, which in Germany was Council of the People's Deputies, in Latvia - People's Council of Latvia.
- The adoption of the election law in Germany - The Law of the Council of People's Deputies of 29 November 1918 on the elections of the National Assembly, in Latvia - The Law of the People's Council of 19 August 1919 on Elections of the Constitutional Assembly
- The creation of governmental institution which members are elected by the people whose aim is to draft a constitution. In Germany it was - The Weimar National Assembly convened on February 6, 1919. In Latvia - The Constitutional Assembly, convened on May 1, 1920.
- Latvia, similarly to the Weimar Republic, adopted a temporary constitutional laws, in the Weimar Republic Law on Provisional State Power (Das Gesetz über die vorläufige Staatsgewalt), in Latvia, Declaration on the State of Latvia and Provisions of the Latvian State, in order to regulate relations in the state prior the constitution
- Within the process of drafting the constitution, a special commission was established, in Germany - "Constitutional Commission of the National Assembly" (Verfassungskommission), in Latvia - "Constitutional Commission of the Constitutional Assembly"
- The Social Democrats were widely represented in both the National Assembly in Weimar and the Constitutional Assembly in Latvia. The Latvian Social Democrats had close ties with Germany, which made it easier to access and exchange information of ideas with the new Weimar Republic. This is sometimes evidenced by the very similar arguments of the Social Democrats in the process of drafting the constitution: Independent Social Democratic Party of Germany (USPD) warned that the President should not be given unlimited powers, as the President was perceived as a kind of "substitute kaiser". In Latvia, the Latvian Social Democrats defended the principle that the president ideologically is the heir to the monarch).

During the drafting of the Satversme, the Weimar Constitution was the most modern and progressive system of constitutional control at the time. The German republic system chosen as the Weimar Constitution corresponded to the ideas of national and statehood ideas of Latvia as well. The historical influence of Germany, including legal, in the Latvian territory, with its significant influence on the legal consciousness of the Latvian people, allowed to take over the norms of the Weimar Constitution not only formally, but also to envisage their settlement in the general population and society. German, being one of the working languages in the Constitutional Assembly in Latvia and as a widely known language at that place and time, contributed to the choice of the Weimar Constitution as a system for the Satversme.

According to the transcripts of the meetings of the Constitutional Assembly, the deputies of the Constitutional Assembly sometimes referred to Satversme as a derivation of the Weimar Constitution, especially to the draft Part II of the Satversme. Comparing the Weimar Constitution and the Latvian Constitution adopted in 1922, it can be noticed that the Constitution does not contain fundamental human rights. At the same time, the failure to accept Part II of the Satversme is not a deliberate abandonment of the model of the Weimar Constitution, but the reason for not accepting it is a political dispute over the content of individual rights.

== Overview ==
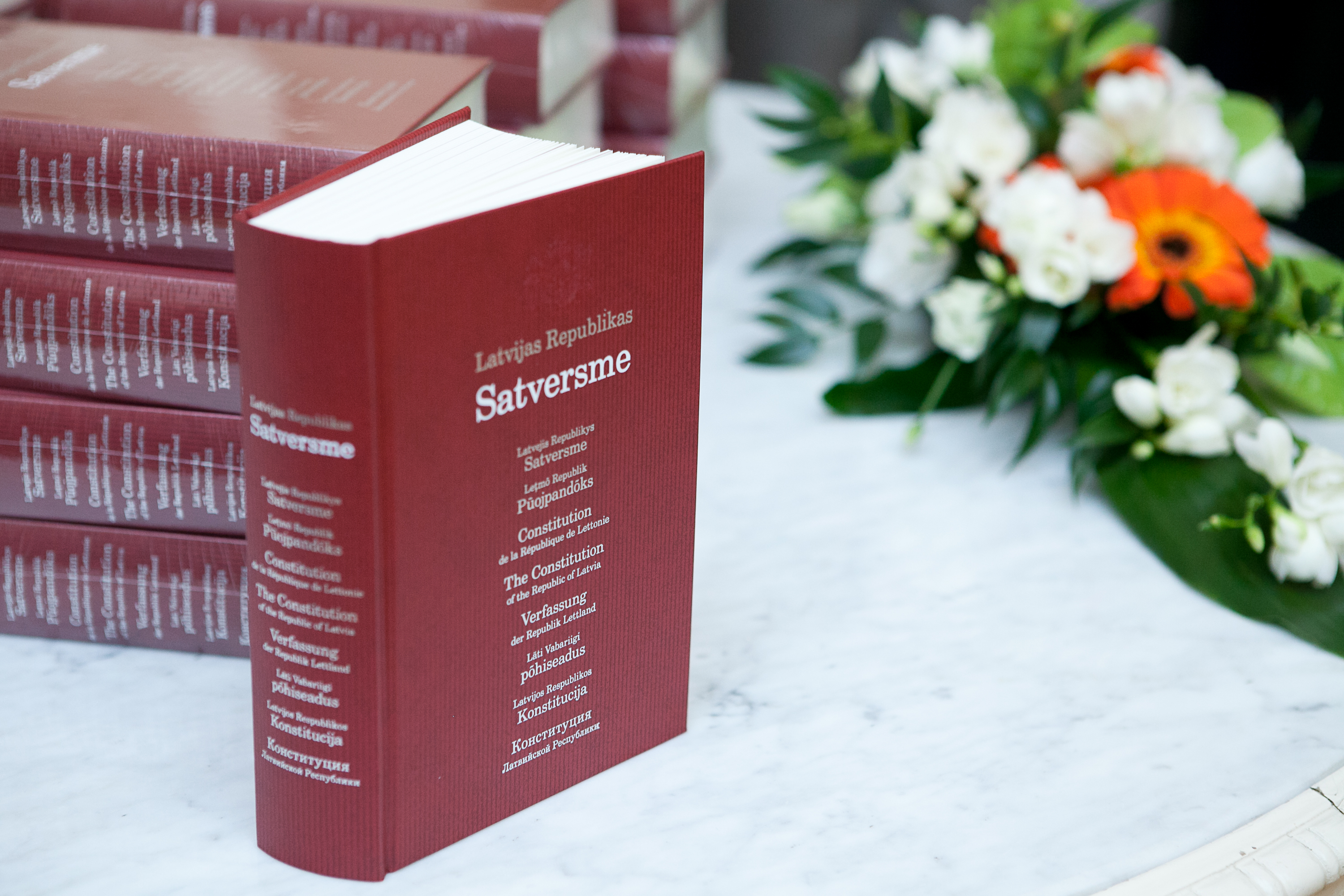
Satversme 90th anniversary edition with editions in Latgalian, Livonian and other languages

The Constitution of Latvia is a codified constitution and currently consists of 116 articles arranged in eight chapters:

- Chapter 1: General Provisions (articles 1-4)
- Chapter 2: Saeima (articles 5-34)
- Chapter 3: The President (articles 35-54)
- Chapter 4: The Cabinet (articles 55-63)
- Chapter 5: Legislation (articles 64-81)
- Chapter 6: Courts (articles 82-86)
- Chapter 7: The State Audit Office (articles 87-88)
- Chapter 8: Fundamental human rights (articles 89-116)

Thus the constitution establishes five government bodies - the Saeima, the President, the Cabinet, the Courts and the State Audit Office.

=== Key principles ===
Articles 1, 2, 3 and 6, which establish the legal basis of the state's political system, were the first to be adopted after the restoration of independence. These articles, along with articles 4 and 77, can only be amended if submitted to a national referendum:

1. Latvia is an independent democratic republic.
2. The sovereign power of the State of Latvia is vested in the people of Latvia.
3. The territory of the State of Latvia, within the borders established by international agreements, consists of Vidzeme, Latgale, Kurzeme and Zemgale.
4. The Latvian language is the official language in The Republic of Latvia. The national flag of Latvia shall be red with a band of white.
6. The Saeima shall be elected in general, equal and direct elections, and by secret ballot based on proportional representation.
77. If the Saeima has amended the first, second, third, fourth, sixth or seventy-seventh Article of the Constitution, such amendments, in order to come into force as law, shall be submitted to a national referendum.

=== Saeima ===
The Saeima, the parliament of Latvia, consists of 100 members, designated by the constitution as representatives of the people. It is elected in general, equal and direct elections for a term of four years, by secret ballot based on proportional representation of voters in each electoral district. The Constitution describes in general how the Saeima should work, noting that the Saeima should also establish rules of order to regulate its internal operations and order.

=== Executive branch ===
Executive power is vested in the President and the Cabinet of ministers. The President however is not politically responsible for carrying out his duties and all his orders have to be signed by the Prime Minister or by the appropriate Minister who thereby becomes responsible for this order. There are two exceptions to this rule - the President can single-handedly decide to dissolve the Saeima and when a new government is formed it is up to him to choose a new Prime Minister. The cabinet is formed by the Prime Minister.

=== Courts ===
The Constitution establishes district (city) courts, regional courts, the Supreme Court and Constitutional Court, and rules that, in the event of war or a state of emergency, military courts can also be established. Judges are to be appointed by the Saeima and this decision is irreversible, the Saeima can forcibly remove a judge from office only upon a decision of the Judicial Disciplinary Board or a judgment of the Court in a criminal case.

=== Legislation ===
Under the constitution, the right to legislate has been granted to the Saeima. Draft laws may be submitted to the Saeima by the President, the Cabinet or committees of the Saeima, by more than five MPs or by one-tenth of the electorate if provisions to do so, set out in the Constitution, are met. Laws are to be adopted by the Saeima and proclaimed by the President.

=== State Audit Office ===
The State Audit Office of the Republic of Latvia is an independent collegial supreme audit institution, a key element in the State's financial control system serving public interest by providing independent assurance on the effective and useful utilization of central and local government resources.

The Constitution establishes the State Audit Office of the Republic of Latvia as an independent collegial institution and describes the process of appointing Auditors General - the procedure is essentially the same as when appointing judges, with the exception that Auditor General has a fixed term of office. The State Audit Office controls how the state financial resources are used.

=== Fundamental human rights ===
Although the constitutional bill included a chapter that was to regulate citizens' rights and obligations this was not originally adopted. The chapter on human rights was added as part of constitutional amendment in 1998.

== Amendments ==
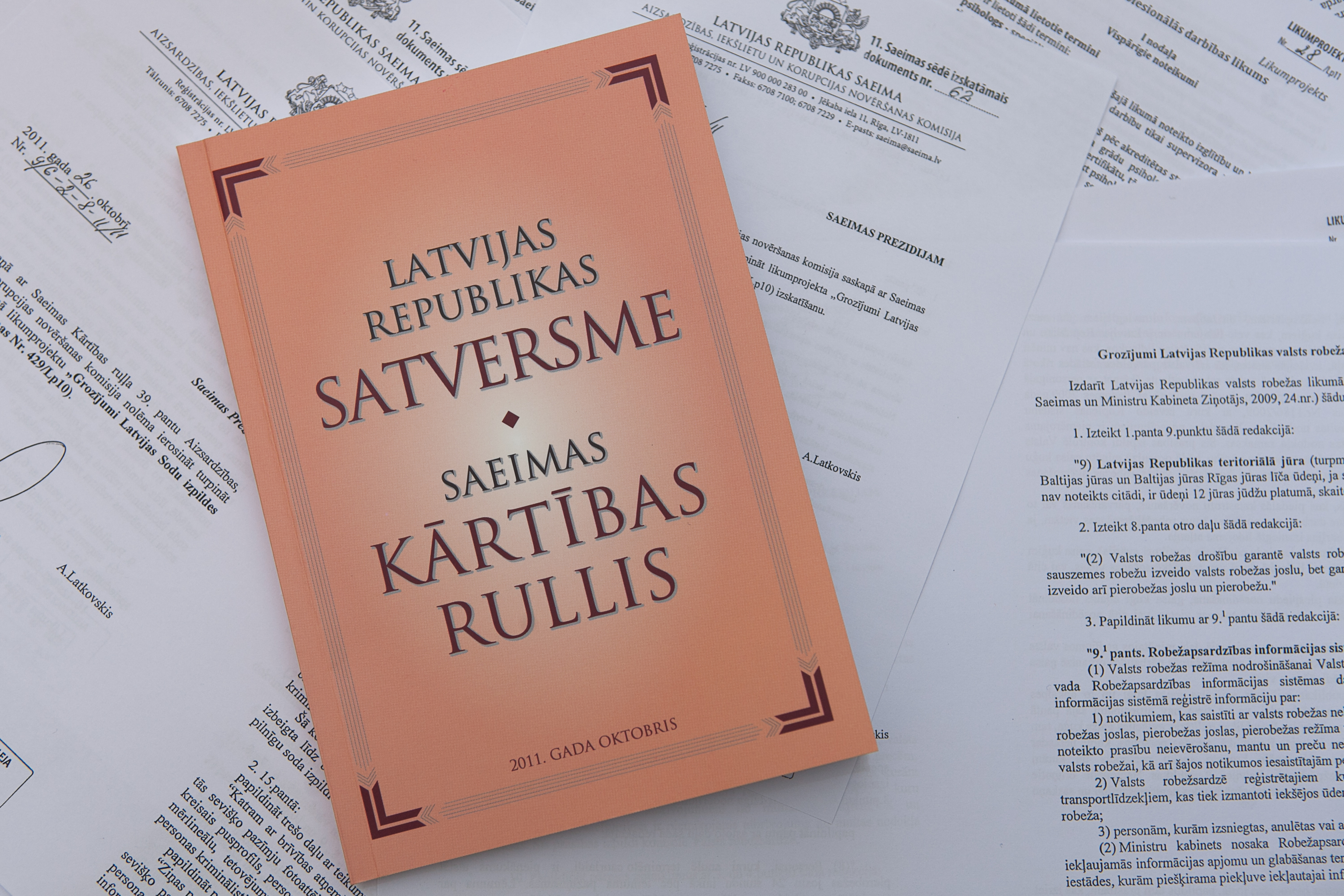
Combined edition of the Satversme and the Rules of Order of the Saeima

Provisions for amendments are stated in articles 76-79 of the constitution. Amendments to most articles can be made by the Saeima. Articles 1, 2, 3, 4, 6, 77 are exceptions, as article 77 requires a referendum to amend these articles. During the interwar period amendments were rare–only one amendment was made and one major amendment was almost passed, but was never adopted due to the coup. Since the renewal of independence, however, eight amendments have been made.

In 1994 the voting age was lowered from 21 to 18. In 1996, the Constitutional Court was established. In 1997, major changes to the articles regulating the process of elections and the functions of Saeima, the President (including prolonging their terms of office from 3 to 4 years) and the Cabinet were made. In 1998, aside from adding chapter eight (fundamental human rights) to the constitution, official status was secured to the Latvian language, the requirement for a referendum to change articles 4 and 77 was made, and article 82 was fully changed; it now defines types of courts in Latvia. In 2002, requirement for members of Saeima to give a solemn promise to acquire their mandate was added. Official status for the Latvian language was further secured by making it the working language of state and municipal structures. In 2003, several amendments were made in order for Latvia to join the European Union. In 2004, amendments to certain rights of the president and citizens were made. In 2006, an amendment that defined that marriage as the union of one man and one woman was added. In 2007, article 40 was amended and article 81 was abolished. In 2009, possibility for electorate to dissolve the Parliament was introduced.

== Preamble ==
On 19 June 2014 Preamble of the Constitution of Latvia was adopted by Saeima. Preamble text initially presented by European Court of Justice judge Egils Levits on 2013 described all basic values of the Republic of Latvia and Latvians. Levits draft of preamble to the Satversme stated the following:

- In order to ensure the existence of the Latvian nation through the centuries, preservation and development of the Latvian language and culture, [and] prosperity of every human being and people [of Latvia] as a whole, the Latvian people;
- having regard for the fact that, as a result of the consolidation of nation and the formation of national consciousness on 18 November 1918, the Republic of Latvia that has been proclaimed on the lands historically belonging to Latvians has been established upon the immutable will of the Latvian nation and its inextinguishable right to self-determination in order freely to self-determine and as a nation‑state to build the future in its own state;
- bearing in mind that the people won their state during the Latvian War of Liberation, that it did not recognize the occupation authorities, and that it resisted them, and on the basis of state continuity, restoring state independence, it regained its freedom;
- expressing gratitude to the state's founders, honouring its freedom-fighters, and commemorating the victims of retaliations by invaders' forces;
- in awareness that the Latvian state's basic task is to promote the spiritual, social, cultural, and material welfare, ensuring legal order, safety, environmental protection, and conservation of nature and reconciling economic development with human values and necessities;
- recognizing that the traditions of Latvian democracy are the citizens' direct participation in the conduct of public affairs and the parliamentary republic, and providing that the Latvian state in its activities especially respects principles of democracy and the rule of law and principles of a national and social state, [and that Latvian state] recognize and protect human rights, including minority rights;
- recognizing the inviolability of the independence of the Latvian state, its territory, its territorial integrity, the sovereignty of the people, the Latvian language as the only state language, [and] the democratic set-up of the state, and that it is the responsibility of everyone to protect these values;
- pointing out that all have a duty to take care of themselves, their kinsmen, and the common good of society and to behave responsibly toward their fellow human beings, society, the state, the environment, nature, and future generations;
- being aware that Latvian ethno-cultural Weltanschauung [dzīvesziņa, literally 'wisdom of life'] and Christian values significantly shaped our identity; that the values of the society are freedom, honesty, justice, and solidarity; that family is the basic unit of the society; and that work is a foundation for growth and prosperity of everyone and the nation as a whole;
- emphasising that Latvia is actively participating in international affairs; protecting its interests; and contributing to the human, sustainable, democratic, and responsible development of Europe and the world at large, in line with the national anthem 'God Bless Latvia!', which expresses the idea of a free nation-state in its freely elected Constitutional Assembly, have strengthened the Latvian national constitutional order and adopted the following Satversme of the state.

=== Controversy of Preamble ===
There was a considerable amount of discussion in Latvia about the initiative for a Preamble and its contents. For example, some organizations stated that text aims to anchor in the State Constitution an "Ethnic Latvian Nation" as the primary principle of sovereignty, in contrast to the current multi-ethnic country which is composed of the "people of Latvia". Others opposed mentioning of "Christian values" and "Latvian life-wisdom" as outdated and not fitting for the 21st century. Legal scholar Kristine Jarinovska states that idea Levits has proposed is to describe all basic values of the Republic of Latvia in order to put a stop to misuse of popular will. A referendum to approve or disapprove the initiative to add an inviolable preamble to the Constitution of the Republic of Latvia is not necessary, stated Justice Minister of Latvia Jānis Bordāns.
