= On the Restoration of Independence of the Republic of Latvia =

1990 Latvian legal document restoring the country's independence

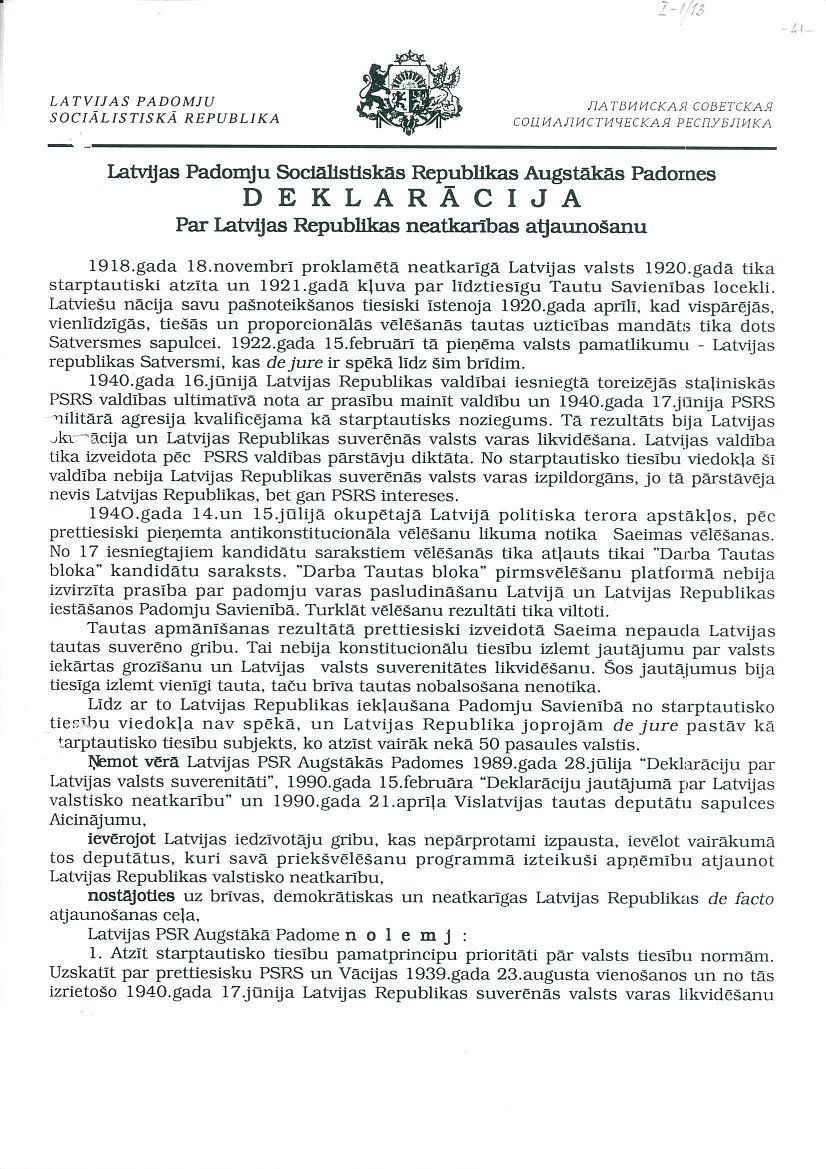

Supreme Soviet of the Latvian Soviet Socialist Republic
- Territorial extent: Latvian Soviet Socialist Republic
- Passed by: Supreme Soviet of the Latvian Soviet Socialist Republic
- Passed: 04.05.1990.
- Enacted: 04.05.1990.
- Signed by: Anatolijs Gorbunovs
- Voting summary: 138 voted for; 1 abstained; 5 absent; 57 present not voting
- Status: In force

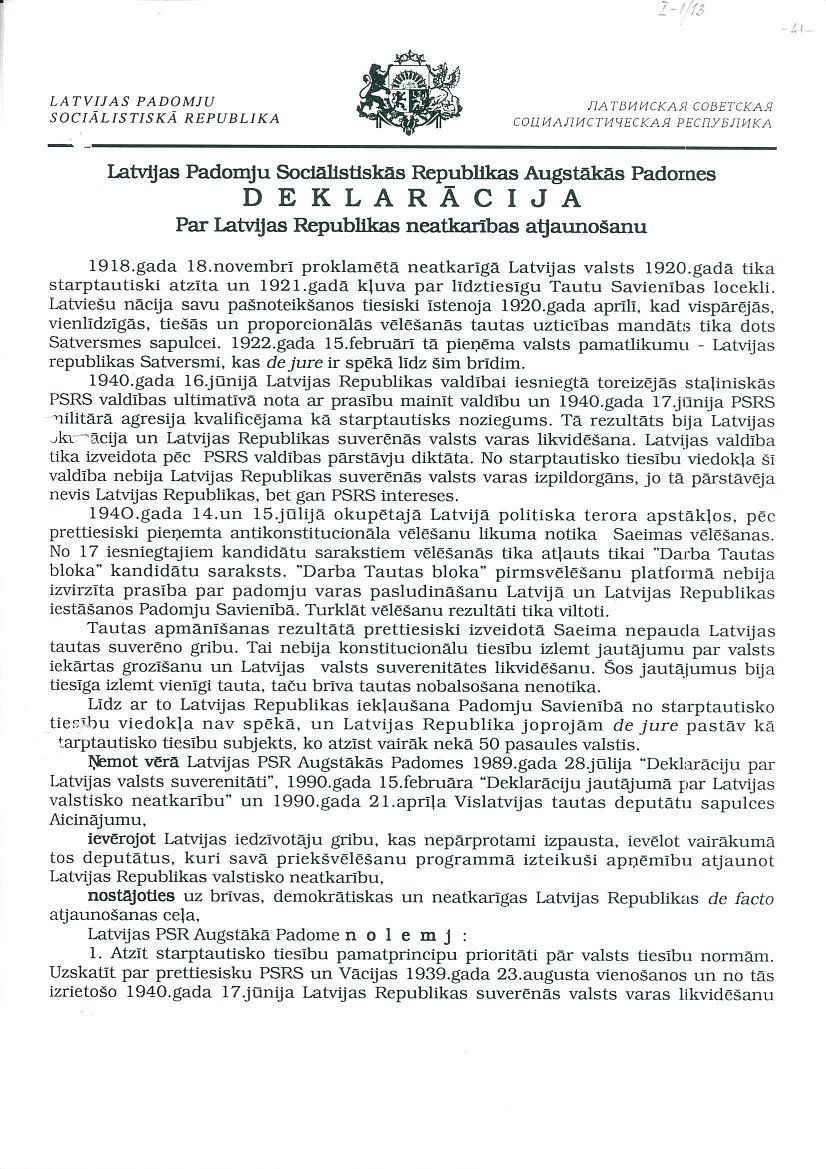
Page 1 of the declaration adopted on 4 May 1990

The Declaration "On the Restoration of Independence of the Republic of Latvia" (Latvian: Deklarācija par Latvijas Republikas neatkarības atjaunošanu) was adopted on 4 May 1990 by the Supreme Soviet of the Latvian SSR in which Latvia declared the re-instatement of its sovereignty and its independence from the Soviet Union. The Declaration stated that, although Latvia had de facto lost its independence in 1940, when it was annexed by the Soviet Union, the country had de jure remained a sovereign country as the annexation had been illegal, unconstitutional, and contrary to the will of the Latvian people.

It asserted the priority of the basics of the international law over the national laws and therefore it resolved that the Molotov–Ribbentrop Pact and the Soviet occupation of Latvia in 1940 were illegal. It also asserted that the heavily rigged 1940 elections were illegal and unconstitutional, and that all acts of the People's Saeima chosen at that election–including the request to join the Soviet Union on 21 July 1940–were ipso facto void.

On this basis, the Supreme Soviet–now renamed the Supreme Council–annulled the declaration on the accession of Latvia to the Soviet Union, and began a transition to de facto independence, which would end upon the first session of Saeima. It also reinstituted the Constitution of Latvia (Satversme) of 1922, but then suspended all but articles 1, 2, 3, and 6 of that document. It declared that during the transitional period, the Constitution of the Latvian SSR and other laws would remain applicable as long as they did not contradict articles 1, 2, 3, and 6 of Satversme, which were reinforced by the declaration.

It was provided that a committee to elaborate a new edition of Satversme should be created. Social, economic, cultural, and political rights were granted to citizens and residents of Latvia in accordance with international human rights. The declaration also stated that Latvia would form its relationship with the Soviet Union on the basis of the Latvian–Soviet Peace Treaty of 1920, in which the Soviet Union had recognized the independence of Latvia as inviolable "for all future time". 4 May is a national holiday in Latvia.

== Overview ==
=== Historical and juridical background ===
The Declaration begins by reiterating several historical facts. On the basis of these facts, it argued that the Republic of Latvia was still de jure a sovereign country. It observes that Latvia's declaration of independence on 18 November 1918 was internationally recognized in 1920, and that Latvia was admitted to membership in the League of Nations in 1921. The first country to recognize the independence of Latvia de jure was Soviet Russia on 11 August 1920, when the Soviet-Latvian Peace treaty was signed (it is generally considered that the independence of Latvia de jure was internationally recognized on 26 January 1921, when it was recognized by the Allies of World War I). The declaration notes that in April 1920 the Latvian nation followed the principle of self-determination by electing a Constitutional Assembly of Latvia, which adopted the Constitution of Latvia (the Satversme) on 15 February 1922, in general, equal and direct elections, based on proportional representation.

On 23 August 1939, the Soviet Union and Nazi Germany signed the Molotov–Ribbentrop Pact, which included a secret protocol dividing Eastern Europe into spheres of influence. Latvia was apportioned to the Soviet sphere and on 5 October 1939, signed a mutual assistance pact. On 16 June 1940, the Soviet Union issued an ultimatum to Latvia accusing it of not carrying out the treaty, namely of forming a military alliance against the USSR, and requested a new government to be formed and to guarantee Soviet military free entrance in Latvia. The Latvian government decided to give in to the ultimatum and on 17 June 1940, Soviet forces entered Latvia. The Declaration states that the Soviet ultimatum and ensuing invasion amounted to an "international crime," and contended that the government formed in accordance with Soviet demands should not be recognized as a representative of Latvian state power, since it represented Soviet, not Latvian, interests.

On 14–15 July 1940, elections were held for the People's Saeima (a Soviet-type Latvian puppet parliament). The People's Saeima met on 21 July 1940, declared Latvia a Soviet republic and sought accession to the Soviet Union. The declaration states that the election of the People's Saeima took place on the basis of unconstitutional and illegally adopted election law in a state of political terror. It noted that the "Latvian Working People's Bloc" (installed by the legalized Communist Party of Latvia) was the only party allowed to contest the election out of 17 parties which submitted lists. According to the declaration, the Working People's Bloc gave no indication prior to the election that it intended to make Latvia part of the Soviet Union, and the election results were heavily falsified. The declaration observes that the People's Saeima was formed by misleading the people and therefore did not express the sovereign will of the Latvian people. It also notes that the People's Saeima had no right to liquidate Latvia's sovereignty on its own authority, since the Constitution required that any major change in the form of the state and its political system must be submitted to a national referendum.

Therefore, the Declaration argued that the annexation of Latvia to the Soviet Union was not valid under international law. It therefore reasserted the status of the Republic of Latvia as a de jure subject of international law, and noted that more than 50 countries still recognized Latvia as an independent state de facto and/or de iure. The Supreme Council thus took the line that Latvia did not need to follow the secession process outlined in the Soviet Constitution, since the Declaration was reasserting an independence that still legally existed. The Latvian diplomatic service in exile had maintained a physical presence of the institutions of independent Latvia abroad since 1940.

=== Basis ===
After concluding that the Republic of Latvia de jure is a sovereign country the Declaration makes note of previously adopted documents and explains that the Supreme Soviet is acting according to the will of inhabitants of Latvia.

First it notes two previous declarations of the Supreme Soviet — "On sovereignty of state of Latvia" of 28 July 1989, which declared that the Latvian SSR will act as a sovereign state and that laws adopted by the Soviet Union will come in force in the territory of Latvian SSR only if the Supreme Soviet has ratified them and "In question of independence of Latvia" of 15 February 1990, in which the Supreme Soviet condemns declaration "On accession of Latvia to Soviet Union" of 21 July 1940, however none of these explicitly called for secession from the Soviet Union.

Secondly it notes Appeal of All-Latvian congress of people deputies of 21 April 1990, which called for restoration of independence. Then it is stated that the Supreme Soviet is acting in accordance with the will of inhabitants of Latvia, which had been clearly expressed by electing as a majority those deputies, who had stated that they will restore independence of the Republic of Latvia in their reelection programme.

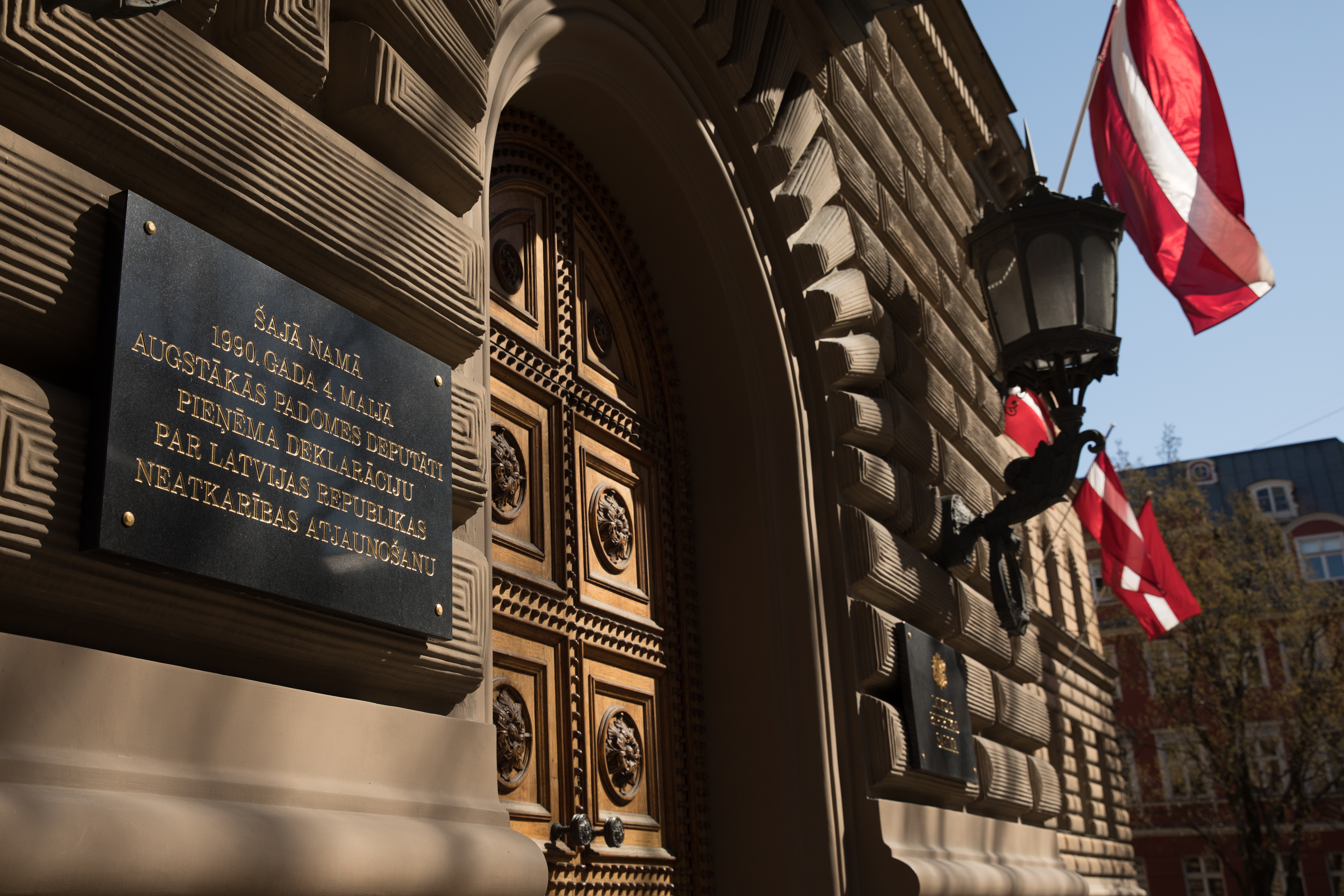
A plaque on the Saeima House, commemorating the adoption of the declaration

=== Act ===
After establishing that the Republic of Latvia de jure is a sovereign country and that by the will of its people it should be independent, the Supreme Soviet ruled:
1. To recognize the priority of international laws over national laws. To hold to be illegitimate the treaty between the USSR and Germany of 23 August 1939, and the consequent liquidation of independence of Latvia resulting from Soviet military aggression on 17 June 1940.
2. To proclaim the declaration "On accession of Latvia to Soviet Union" of 21 July 1940, to be void from the moment of adoption.
3. To re-establish the authority of the Constitution of Latvia and change its official name to the Republic of Latvia, in short Latvia.
4. To suspend the Constitution of Latvia until a new edition is adopted, except for the articles, which in accordance with Article 77 of the Constitution can only be amended if submitted to a national referendum:

1. Latvia is an independent democratic republic.
2. The sovereign power of the State of Latvia is vested in the people of Latvia.
3. The territory of the State of Latvia, within the borders established by international agreements, consists of Vidzeme, Latgale, Kurzeme and Zemgale.
6. The Saeima shall be elected in general, equal and direct elections, and by secret ballot based on proportional representation.

Article 6 shall be applied when the governmental institutions of independent Latvia have been restored, which grant free elections.
5. To set a period of transition to de facto independence until the first session of the new Saeima. During the transitional period the highest power of the state shall be the Supreme Council of the Republic of Latvia.
6. During the transitional period the Constitution of the Latvian SSR and other laws of the Latvian SSR in force at the time when the declaration was made may be applicable as long as they do not contradict articles 1, 2, 3 and 6 of the Constitution of Latvia. Disputes over the applicability of laws shall be resolved by the Constitutional Court. During the transitional period laws shall be made or amended only by the Supreme Council.
7. To constitute a committee, which will elaborate a new edition of the Constitution of Latvia, suitable to the current political, economic and social state of Latvia.
8. In accordance with international human rights, to grant social, economic and cultural rights, as well as political freedoms, to the citizens of Latvia and other countries, who reside in the territory of Latvia. This shall fully apply to those citizens of the Soviet Union who chose to reside in Latvia without its citizenship.
9. To build Latvian-Soviet relationships upon the Latvian-Soviet peace treaty of 11 August 1920, in which the Soviet Union recognizes eternal independence for Latvia and which is still in force. To constitute a committee for negotiations with USSR.

== Adoption ==
The Supreme Soviet was elected on 18 March 1990; it was the first election in Soviet Latvia in which multiple parties were allowed to participate. 201 deputies were elected. The declaration was adopted on 4 May 1990, in an open vote, a majority of two thirds — 132 votes — was required, 138 deputies voted for adoption of the declaration, 1 abstained, while others did not participate in the vote and therefore there were no votes against the declaration.

== Response ==
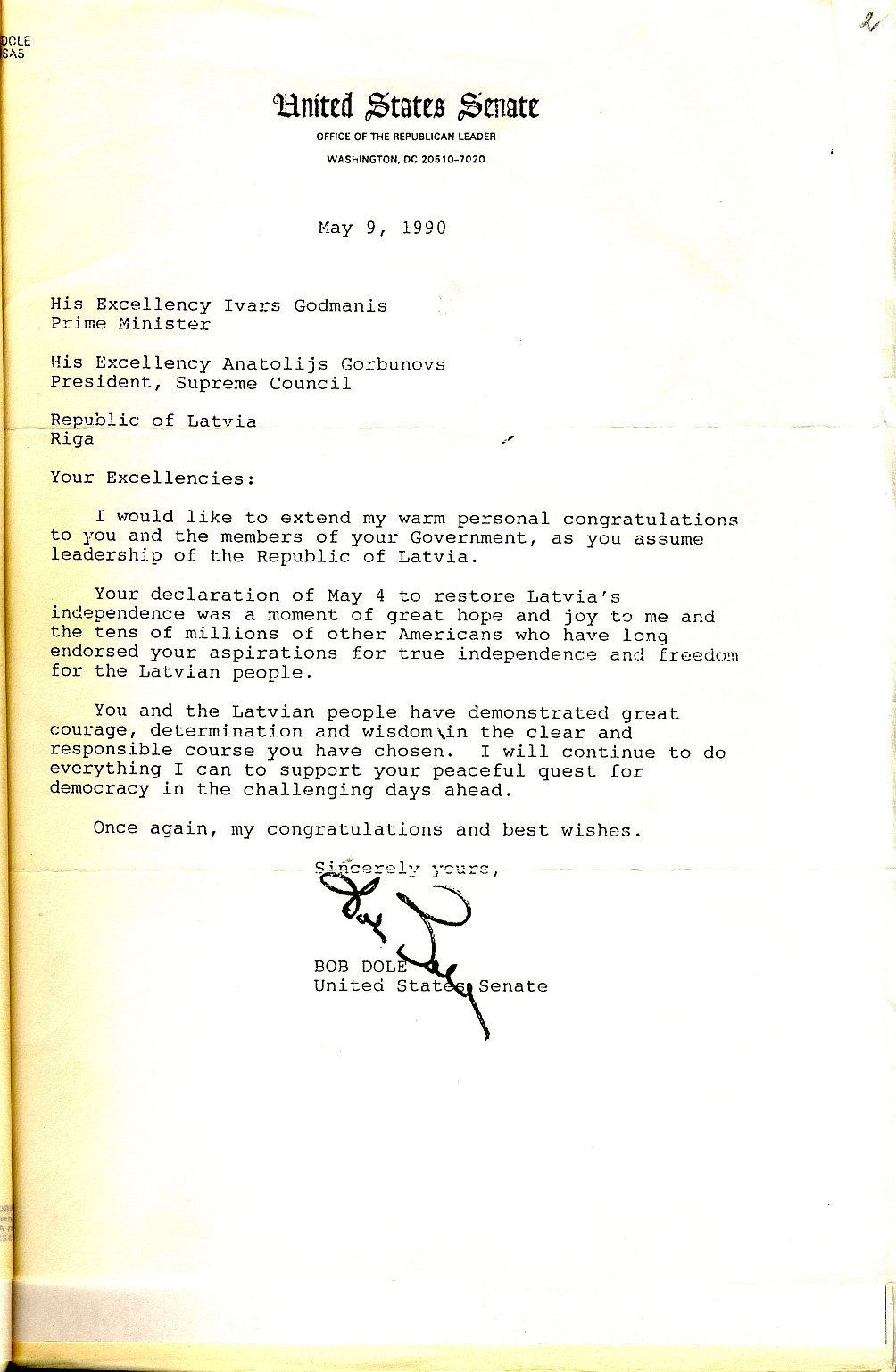
Bob Dole, the Senate Republican leader, letter to Latvia regarding the Independence Restoration Declaration of Latvia in 1990

On 4 May 1990, after the declaration was adopted, the Communist Party of Latvia resolved that it was unconstitutional, contained notable contradictions and historical inaccuracies, and noted that such issues should be decided by referendum. The Communist Party deemed that the declaration might trigger the President of the Soviet Union to take countermeasures, therefore the party should launch a propaganda campaign against the declaration and ask the President of the Soviet Union to annul the declaration of the Supreme Soviet. On 14 May 1990, the President of the Soviet Union Mikhail Gorbachev issued a decree stating that the declaration violated the Constitution of the Soviet Union and the Constitution of the Latvian SSR and thus stood void from the moment of adoption.

The Supreme Council answered that the Constitution of the Soviet Union did not grant the president the right to annul acts adopted by Supreme Soviets of Soviet republics. Furthermore, the Supreme Council announced that the Supreme Soviet, as the legal successor of the People's Saeima, had the right to annul its decisions which contradicted the Constitution of Latvia which was in force at the time these decisions were made and as the Constitution of the Soviet Union ruled that the Soviet Union was founded upon principles of self-determination, but Latvia was forcibly annexed, reference to it had no juridical basis regarding the Latvian SSR.

It also noted that the law of the Soviet Union regarding secession from the Soviet Union to which the decree also referred was not in force in the territory of the Latvian SSR as the Supreme Soviet had not ratified it and that the law contradicted the Constitution of the Soviet Union and the Constitution of Latvian SSR, which provided that Soviet republics can freely secede from the Soviet Union. It was stated that the call for a referendum on secession from the Soviet Union to take place has neither a legal or a political basis, because Latvia had been annexed by the Soviet Union without holding a referendum, which was required by the Constitution of Latvia. Therefore, the Supreme Council argued, Latvia was not seceding from the Soviet Union, but reasserting an independence that still existed under international law.

It was noted that the Constitution of the Latvian SSR did not call for a referendum as it had been stated in the decree, but recommended two alternatives – either a referendum or a public debate which had de facto taken place as it had been discussed in the press and several public opinion polls had taken place showing that a majority of the public supported independence. Similarly in the All-Latvian congress of people deputies of 21 April 1990, 8003 had voted for restoration of independence and the declaration had been adopted by a vote of two thirds of members of the Supreme Soviet which was required for constitutional amendments. Furthermore, the Supreme Council referred to the result of elections of Supreme Soviet as a clear indicator of public opinion that supporters of independence had won the election. The Supreme Council stated that by 28 May 1990, it had received letters and telegrams from 646,726 residents of the Republic supporting the declaration and only 8,993 people had expressed opposition. Given these provisions, the Supreme Council stated that the Declaration was legitimate and in force.

== Further developments ==
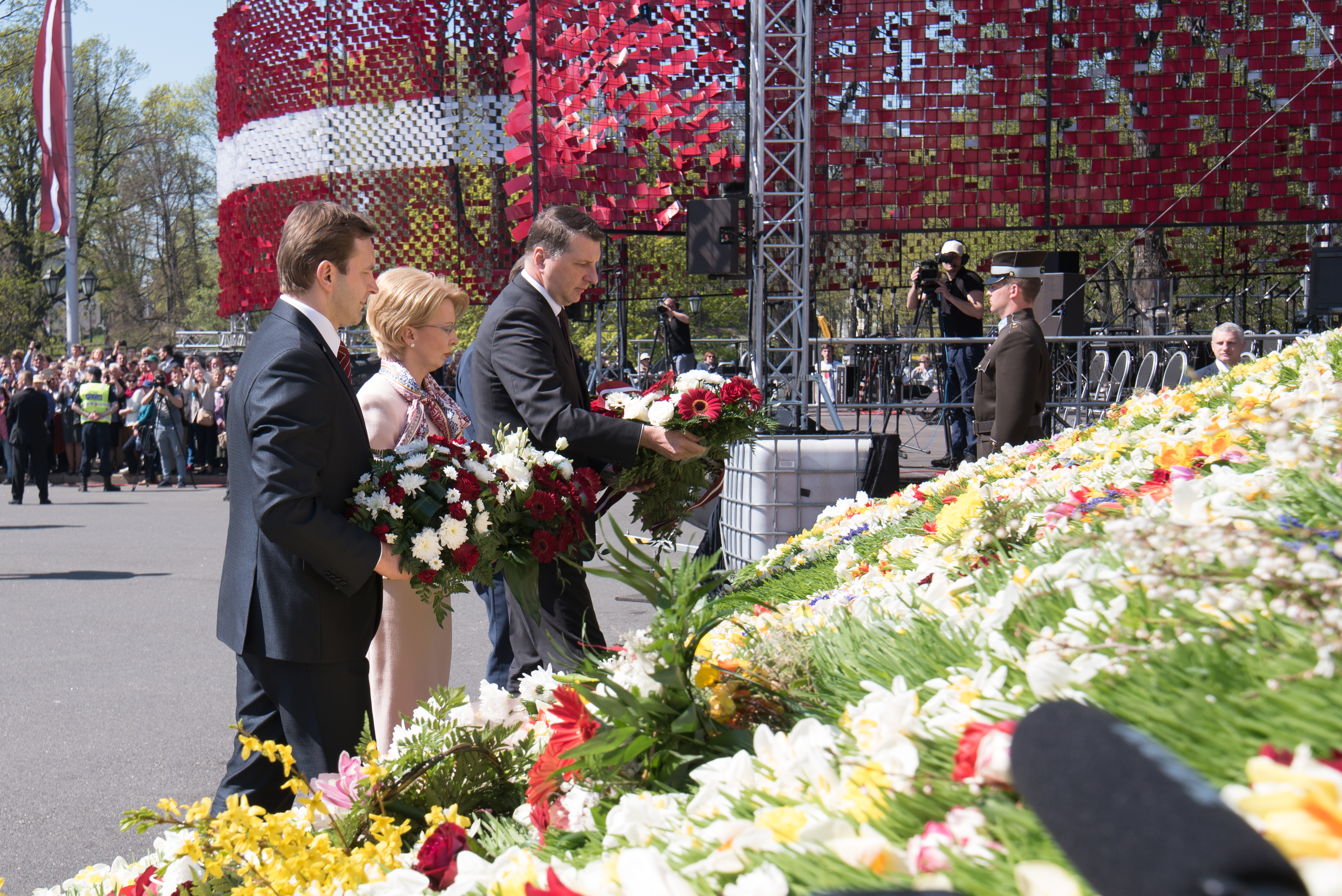
President of Latvia Raimonds Vējonis at the May 4th celebrations in 2016

On 21 August 1991, during the Soviet coup d'état attempt, the Supreme Council adopted a Constitutional law, "On the statehood of the Republic of Latvia", repealing Article 5 of the Declaration, thus ending the transitional period and restoring de facto independence. However, some elements defining the transitional period remained in force until the first session of the 5th Saeima on 6 July 1993 – The Supreme Council remained the highest power of the state and the constitution was suspended.

On 31 July 1990, the Supreme Council formed a work group of 22 deputies, which had to elaborate a new edition of the Constitution before 1 January 1990, though a new edition was never drafted and the Constitution was restored unamended. The Constitutional Court, which was intended to resolve Constitutional disputes during the transitional period, was only founded in 1996. To comply with international human rights as indicated in Article 8, the Supreme Council adopted a declaration of human rights immediately after the Declaration of independence.

On 6 September 1991, after the failed coup attempt, the Soviet Union recognized Latvia's independence.

== See also ==
- Act of the Re-Establishment of the State of Lithuania – A similar Act in the Lithuanian SSR
- Baltic Way
- Estonian Restoration of Independence – A similar Act in the Estonian SSR
- 1991 Latvian independence and democracy referendum
- State continuity of the Baltic states
- Dissolution of the Soviet Union
