= 1978 Constitution of the Latvian Soviet Socialist Republic =

Supreme law of the Latvian SSR (1978-1991)

Constitution (Fundamental Law) of the Latvian Soviet Socialist Republic
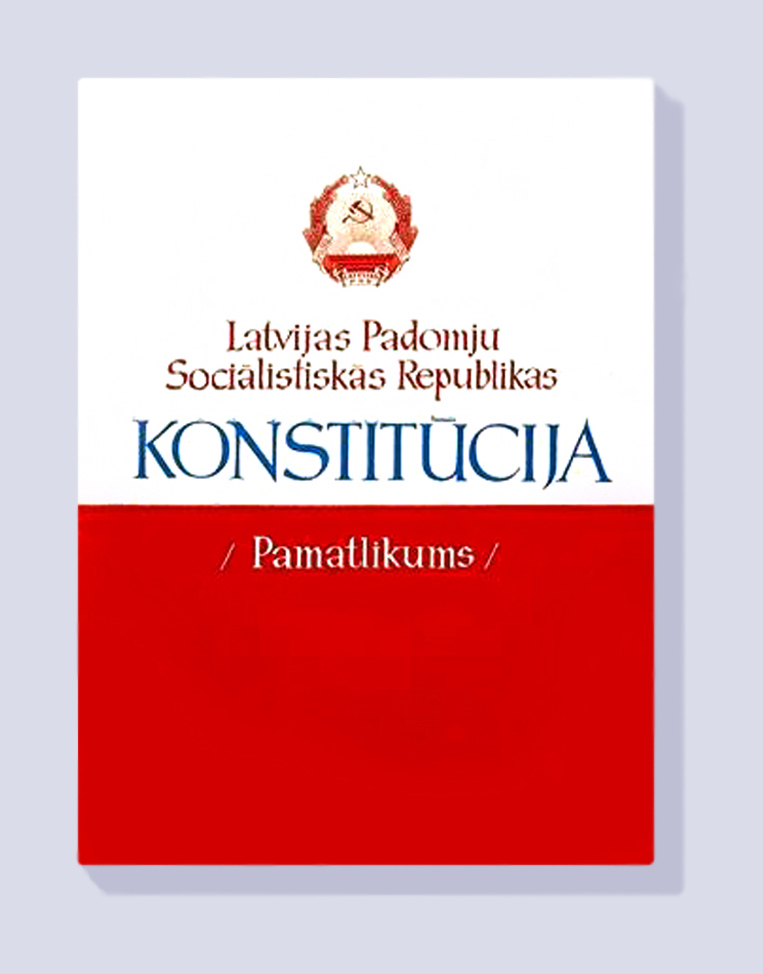

Overview
- Jurisdiction: Latvian SSR
- Ratified: 18 April 1978
- Date effective: 18 April 1978
- Repealed: 21 August 1991
- Supersedes: 1940 Constitution of the Latvian SSR

The 1978 Constitution of the Latvian SSR, officially the Constitution (Fundamental Law) of the Latvian Soviet Socialist Republic (Latvian: Latvijas Padomju Sociālistiskās Republikas Konstitūcija (Pamatlikums); Russian: Конституция (Основной закон) Латвийской Советской Социалистической Республики, romanized: Konstitutsiya (Osnovnoy zakon) Latviyskoy Sovetskoy Sotsialisticheskoy Respubliki) was the communist state constitution of the Latvian Soviet Socialist Republic adopted on April 18, 1978 at the eighth session of the 9th Convocation of the Supreme Soviet of the Latvian SSR.

== History ==
The 1978 Constitution of the Latvian SSR superseded the 1940 Constitution and was modeled after the 1977 Constitution of the Soviet Union, informally known as the Brezhnev Constitution. It was officially ratified and adopted on April 18, 1978. The 1978 Constitution ceased to be effective on August 21, 1991 when Latvia restored its independence. The 1978 Constitution of the Latvian SSR was replaced by the reintroduced Constitution of the Republic of Latvia on July 6, 1993.

Significant amendments to the constitution were introduced in May 1989 which designated Latvian as the state language. The constitution was further amended in July 1989. In 1990, the articles regarding the leading role of the Communist Party of the Soviet Union were abolished and the state symbols (flag and emblem) were changed.

== Structure ==
The constitution consisted of ten sections, nineteen chapters, and 173 articles.

- I. Fundamentals of the social system and policies of the Latvian SSR
  - Chapter 1. The political system (Articles 1-9)
  - Chapter 2. The economic system (Articles 10-18)
  - Chapter 3. Social development and culture (Articles 19-27)
  - Chapter 4. Foreign policy and the defense of the Socialist Fatherland (Articles 28-30)
- II. State and people
  - Chapter 5. Citizenship of the Latvian SSR (Articles 31-36)
  - Chapter 6. Basic rights, freedoms, and duties of citizens (Articles 37-67)
- III. National-state and administrative-territorial structure of the Latvian SSR
  - Chapter 7. The Latvian SSR is a union republic of the USSR (Articles 68-75)
  - Chapter 8. Administrative-territorial structure of the Latvian SSR (Articles 76-77)
- IV. Soviets of People's Deputies of the Latvian SSR and the procedure for their election
  - Chapter 9. The system and principles of activity of the Soviets of People's Deputies (Articles 78-83)
  - Chapter 10. The electoral system (Articles 84-91)
  - Chapter 11. People's Deputy (Articles 92-96)
- V. The supreme bodies of state power and administration of the Latvian SSR
  - Chapter 12. The Supreme Soviet of the Latvian SSR (Articles 97-114)
  - Chapter 13. The Council of Ministers of the Latvian SSR (Articles 115-123)
- VI. Local government and administration bodies in the Latvian SSR
  - Chapter 14. Local Soviets of People's Deputies (Articles 124-132)
  - Chapter 15. Executive Committees of Local Soviets of People's Deputies (Articles 133-139)
- VII. The State Plan for Economic and Social Development of the Latvian SSR and the State Budget of the Latvian SSR
  - Chapter 16. The State Plan for Economic and Social Development of the Latvian SSR (Articles 140-145)
  - Chapter 17. The state budget for the Latvian SSR (Articles 146-150)
- VIII. Justice, Arbitration, and Prosecution
  - Chapter 18. The court and arbitration (Articles 151-163)
  - Chapter 19. The prosecutor's office (Articles 164-167)
- IX. Coat of arms, flag, anthem, and capital of the Latvian SSR (Articles 168-171)
- X. Legal force of the Constitution of the Latvian SSR and the procedure for its amendment (Articles 172-173)

== See also ==
- 1977 Constitution of the Soviet Union
- 1940 Constitution of the Latvian Soviet Socialist Republic
