= House of the Livonian Noble Corporation =

Historic building in Riga, Latvia

House of the Livonian Nobility
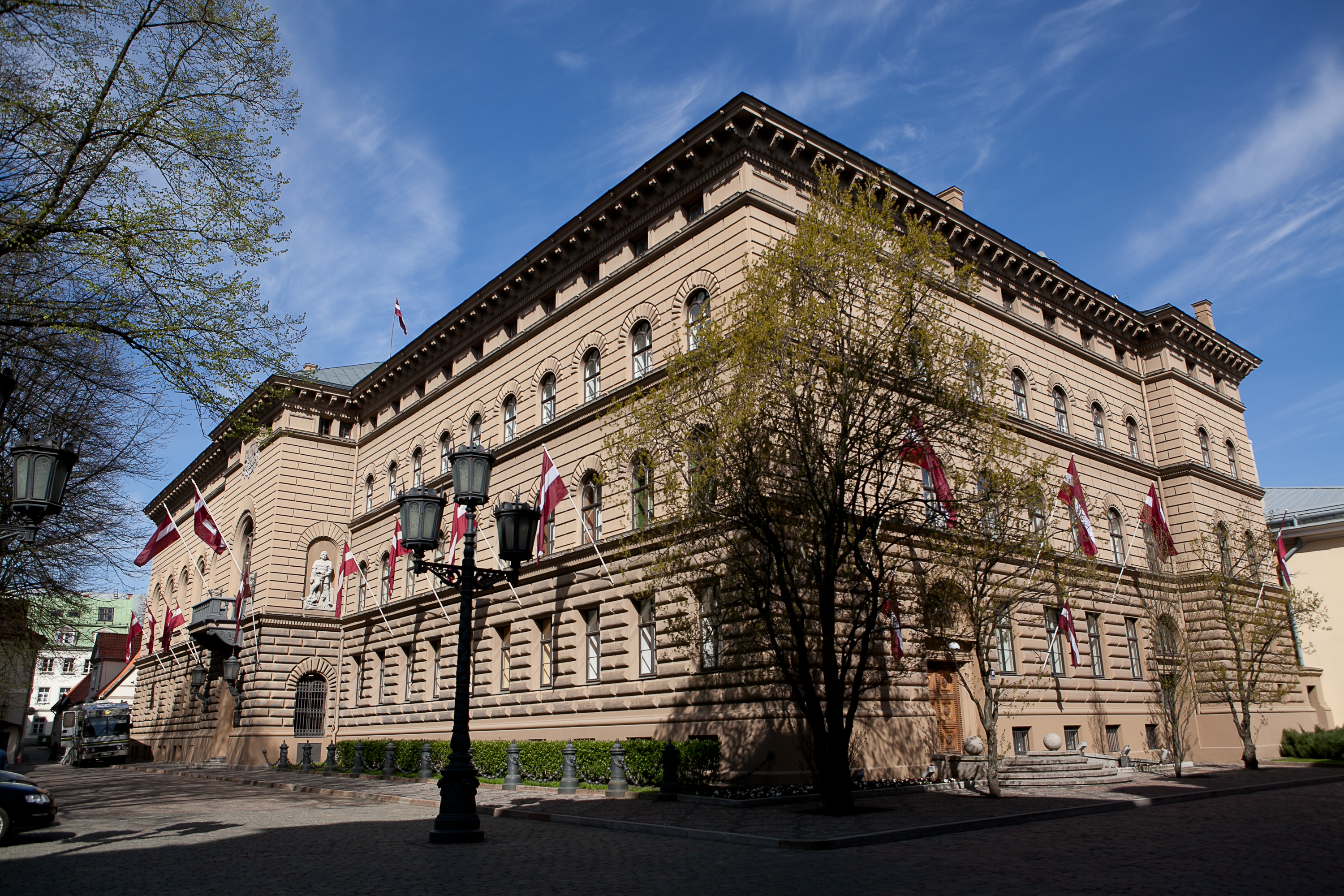
- Corner of Jēkaba and Klostera Streets, Riga.

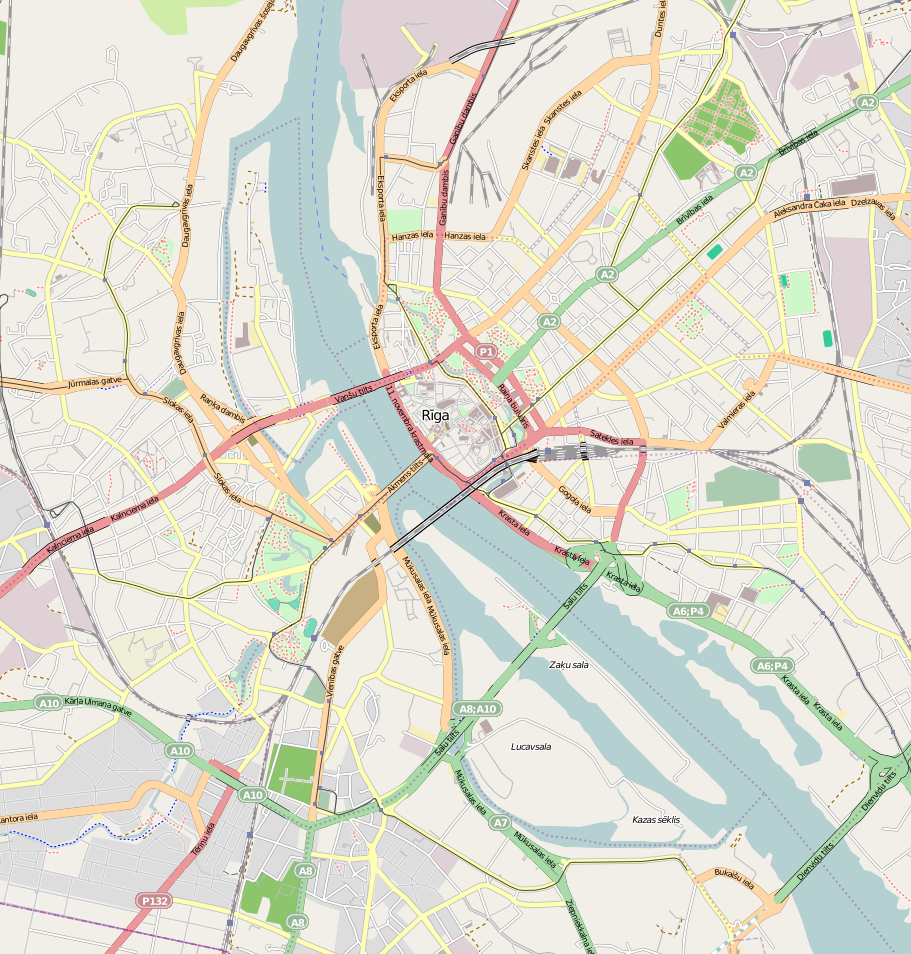
- Location within Riga
- Alternative names: Saeima Building

General information
- Location: Riga, Latvia
- Coordinates: 56°57′4″N 24°6′16″E
- Construction started: 1863
- Completed: 1867; 159 years ago
- Renovated: 1922, 1996–97

Design and construction
- Architects: Robert Pflug, Jānis Baumanis

Renovating team
- Architects: Eižens Laube, Andris Veidemanis

The House of the Livonian Noble Corporation (Latvian: Vidzemes bruņniecības nams), also known as Saeima House (Saeimas nams), is the seat of the parliament of Latvia, the Saeima. It is located in the Vecpilsēta (Old Town) neighbourhood of downtown Riga.

== Architecture ==
The building was constructed to house the Landtag of the Livonian Noble Corporation in the Governorate of Livonia. It was designed by architects Robert Pflug, a Baltic-German and Jānis Baumanis, the first academically trained Latvian architect in the neo-Renaissance style with an Eclectic finish. Construction began in 1863 and was completed in 1867 directly opposite St. James's Cathedral. The façade featured a niche containing a statue by Danish sculptor David Jensen of the Teutonic Landmeister Wolter von Plettenberg.

== History ==
Empire

In the Russian Empire, the Governorate of Livonia was administered with the co-operation of the Livonian Noble Corporation, the estate of nobility who owed fealty to the Emperor. The Noble Corporation, also known as the "knighthood" began at the dissolution of the Teutonic Order in Livonia in the 16th century, and comprised the leading representatives of the Baltic-German nobility who made up the ruling class in Latvia and Estonia until the First World War. The Landtag was never a democratic body.

Latvian independence

After the People’s Council declared Latvian independence on 18 November 1918 the building served as its home, except for the period during 1919 when the All-Latvian Congress of Workers' Soviet Deputies of the Latvian Socialist Soviet Republic controlled Riga. After the socialist republic was defeated, the building became the seat of the Constitutional Assembly elected in 1920. On 17 October 1921, the building, including the Plenary Chamber, was destroyed by arson. The suspect, Kārlis Putrams, was a parliamentary usher and was linked to Communist groups, and in April 1922 was sentenced to 15 years hard labor. The building was restored according to the design of the architect Eižens Laube by 1923. The restoration included a new statue by sculptor Rihards Maurs of Lāčplēsis, the "Bear-slayer", from the Latvian epic of the same name, replacing the statue of von Plettenberg which was destroyed in the fire. At the time of the building's restoration the main assembly hall was modified to meet the needs of the Saeima of the new Republic of Latvia. The Saeima chamber today still approximates this design. The last meeting of the Constitutional Assembly, which wrote the Constitution of Latvia took place in the restored building on 3 November 1922.

Authoritarian régime

The building served as the home of the Saeima until a self-coup by serving Prime Minister Kārlis Ulmanis in 1934. Ulmanis assumed the title of President in 1936 and the continuous dissolution of the Saeima served the purposes of his authoritarian régime, the building was instead to house the presidential administration.

Occupation

During the Second World War, after Latvia was occupied, the building was the location of the Supreme Soviet of the Latvian SSR under the Soviets and the headquarters of the SS and police for the Eastern territories under Nazi Germany. Latvia remained under Soviet occupation after the war and the building served as the location of the Supreme Soviet for almost half a century. In the early 1980s one of the inner courtyards was walled in to expand building space, this part of the building is now known as the Voting Room.

Restoration of independence

After the restoration of independence on 4 May 1990, the building was home to the Supreme Council of the Republic of Latvia, which functioned as an interim parliament until the Constitution was fully re-established with the election of the next Saeima. Since 1993 it is once again home to Latvia's parliament. In 1996, the vestibule and the large marble staircase were repainted to create an impression closer to Eclectic style. In 1997, the Plenary Chamber was renovated by architect Andris Veidemanis in cooperation with SIA AIG.

== Gallery ==
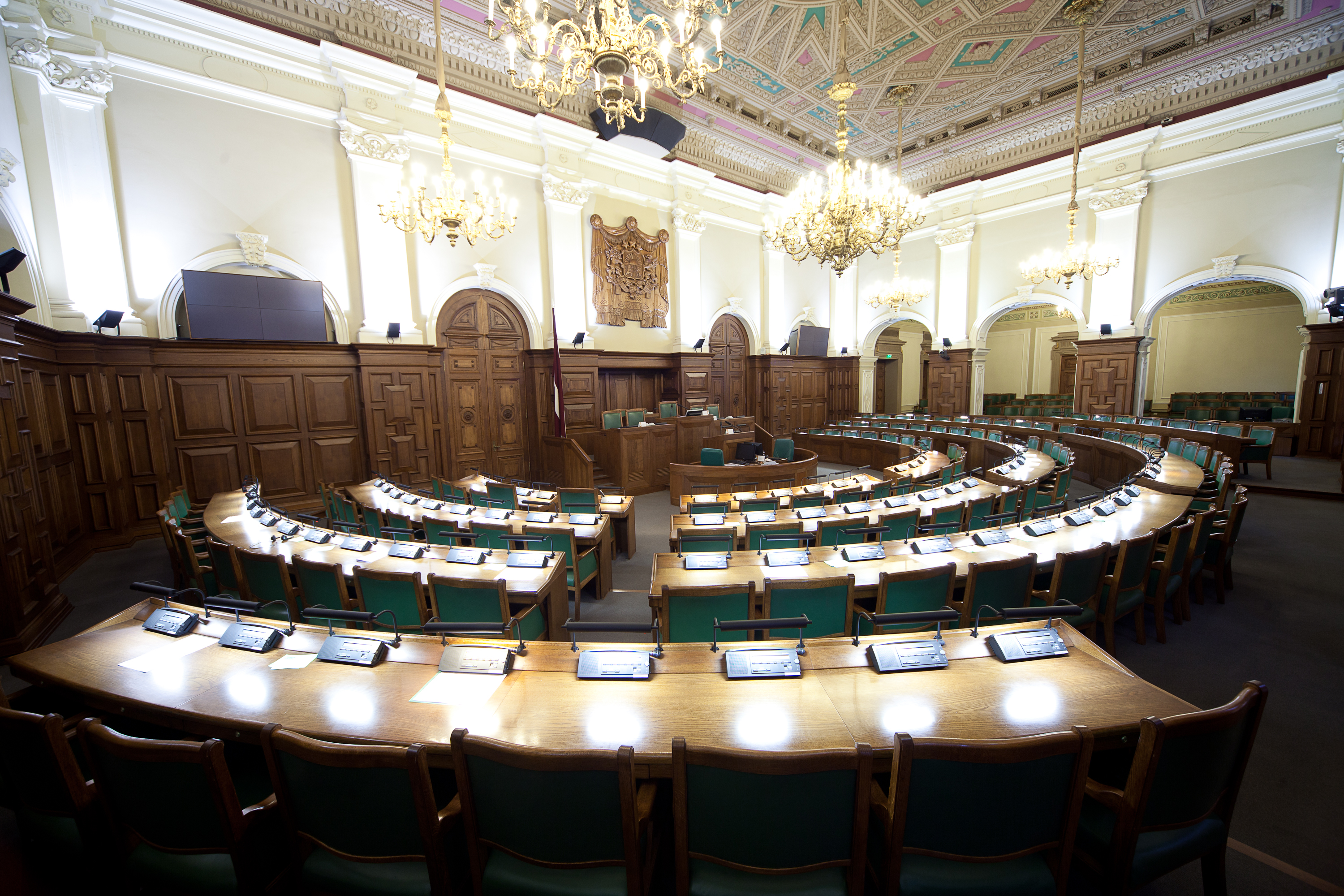
Plenary Chamber

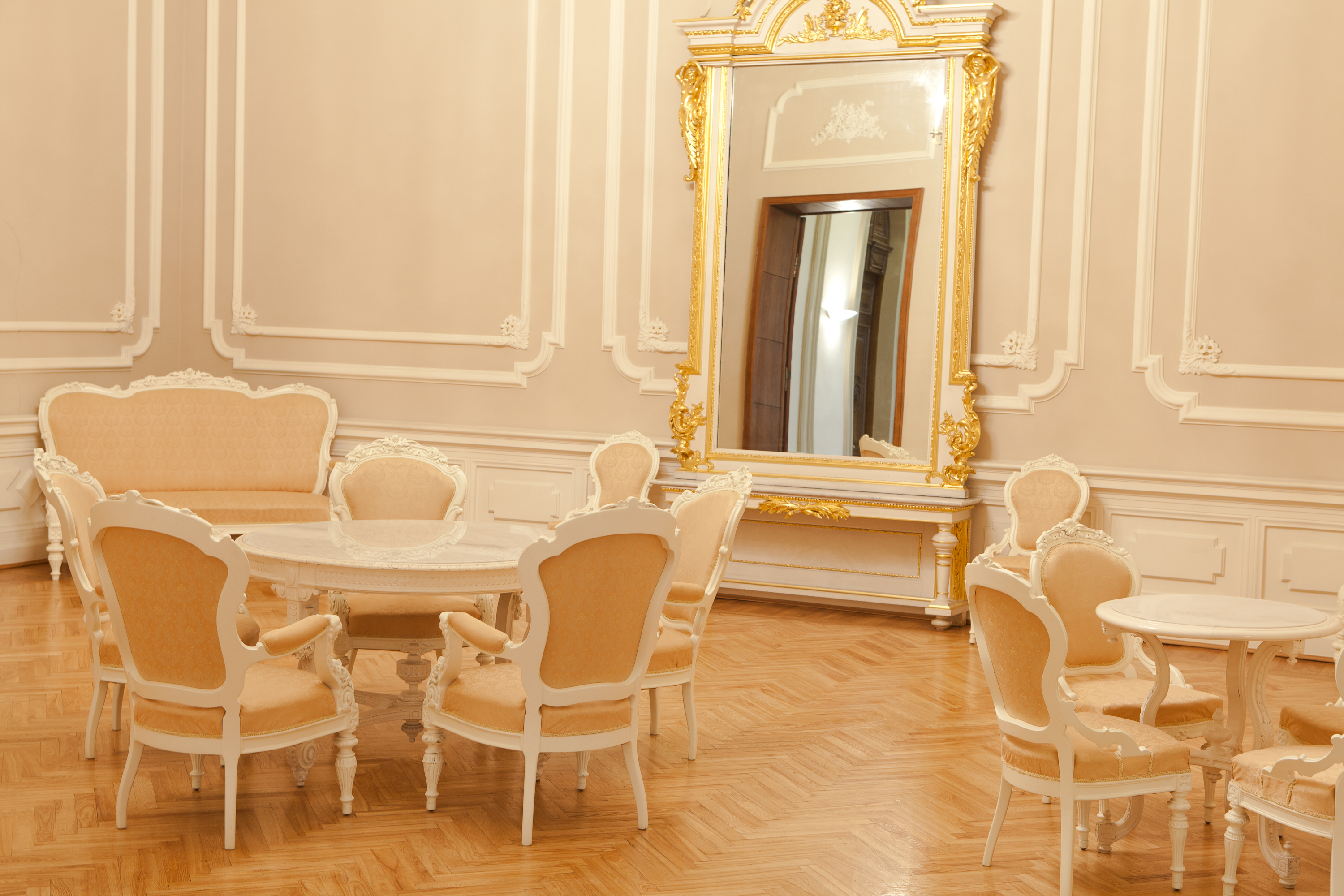
Yellow Room

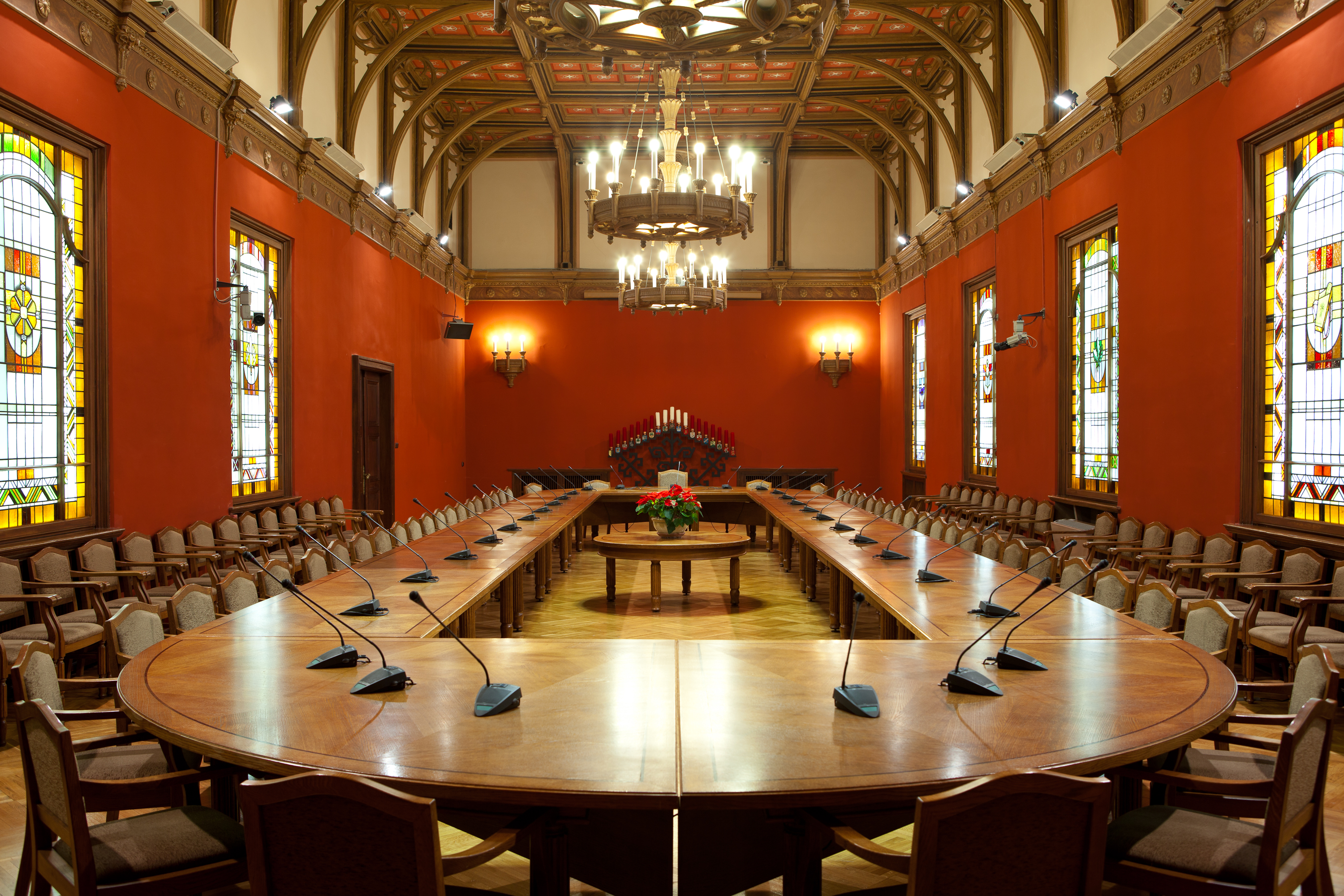
Red Room

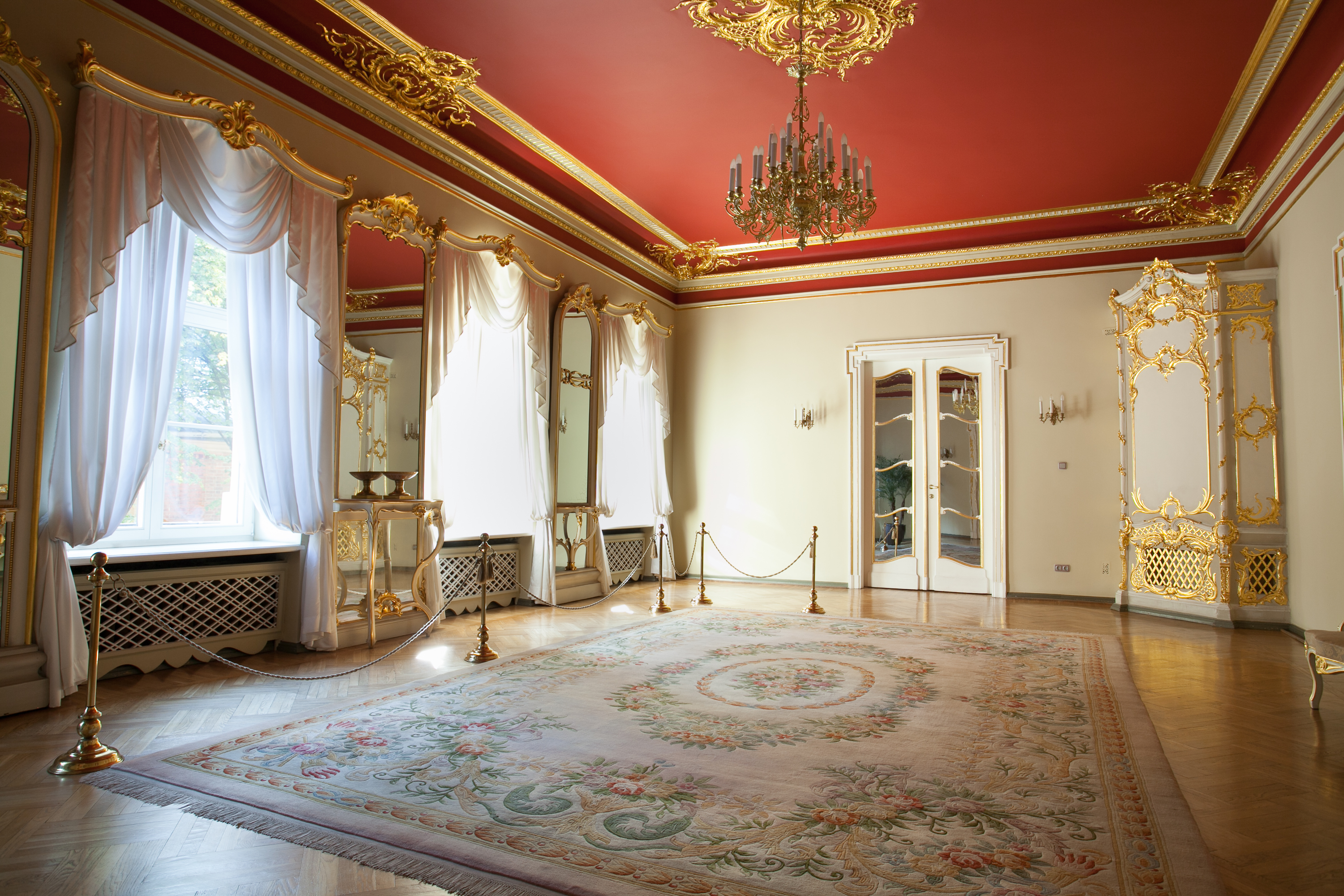
White Room

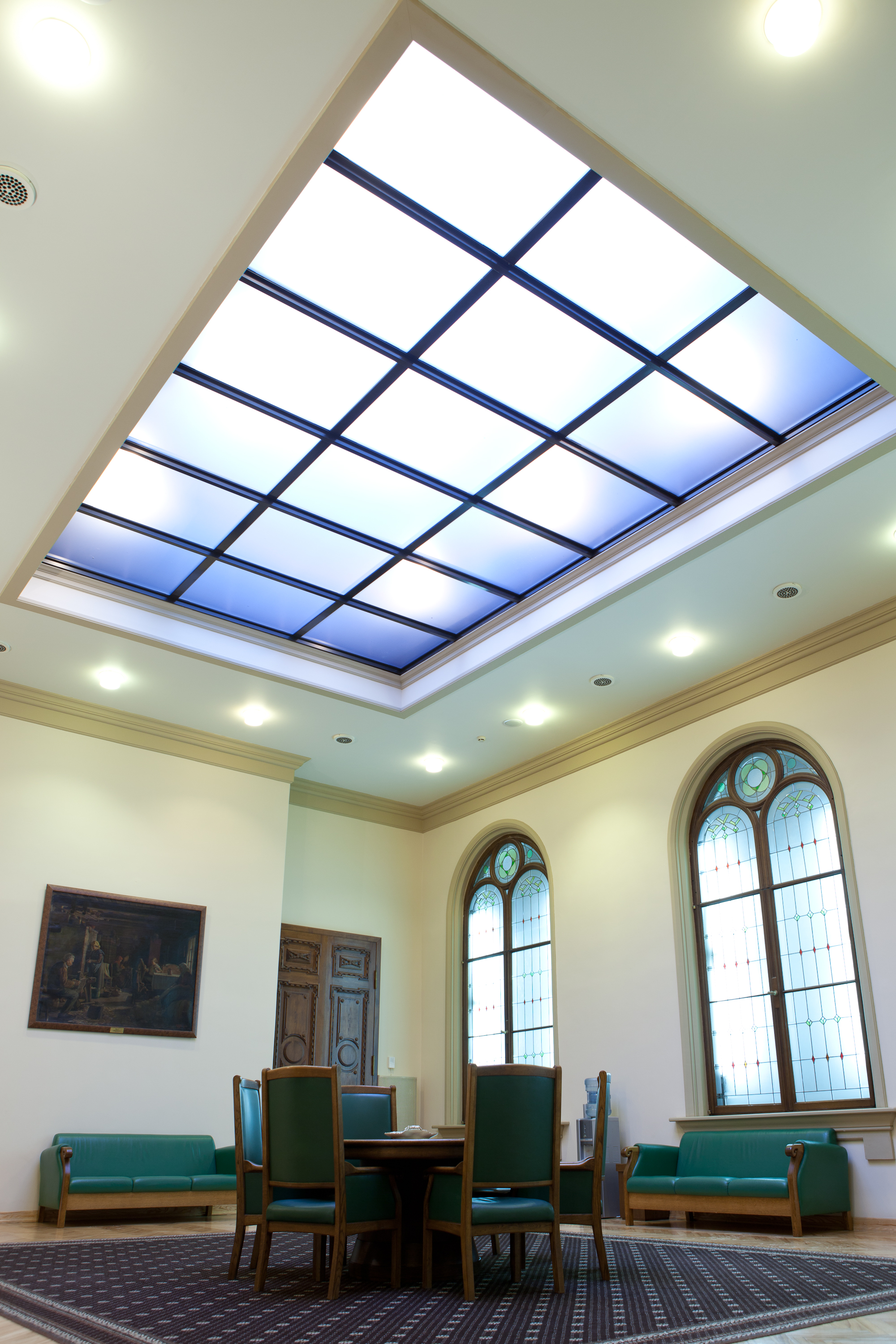
Voting Room

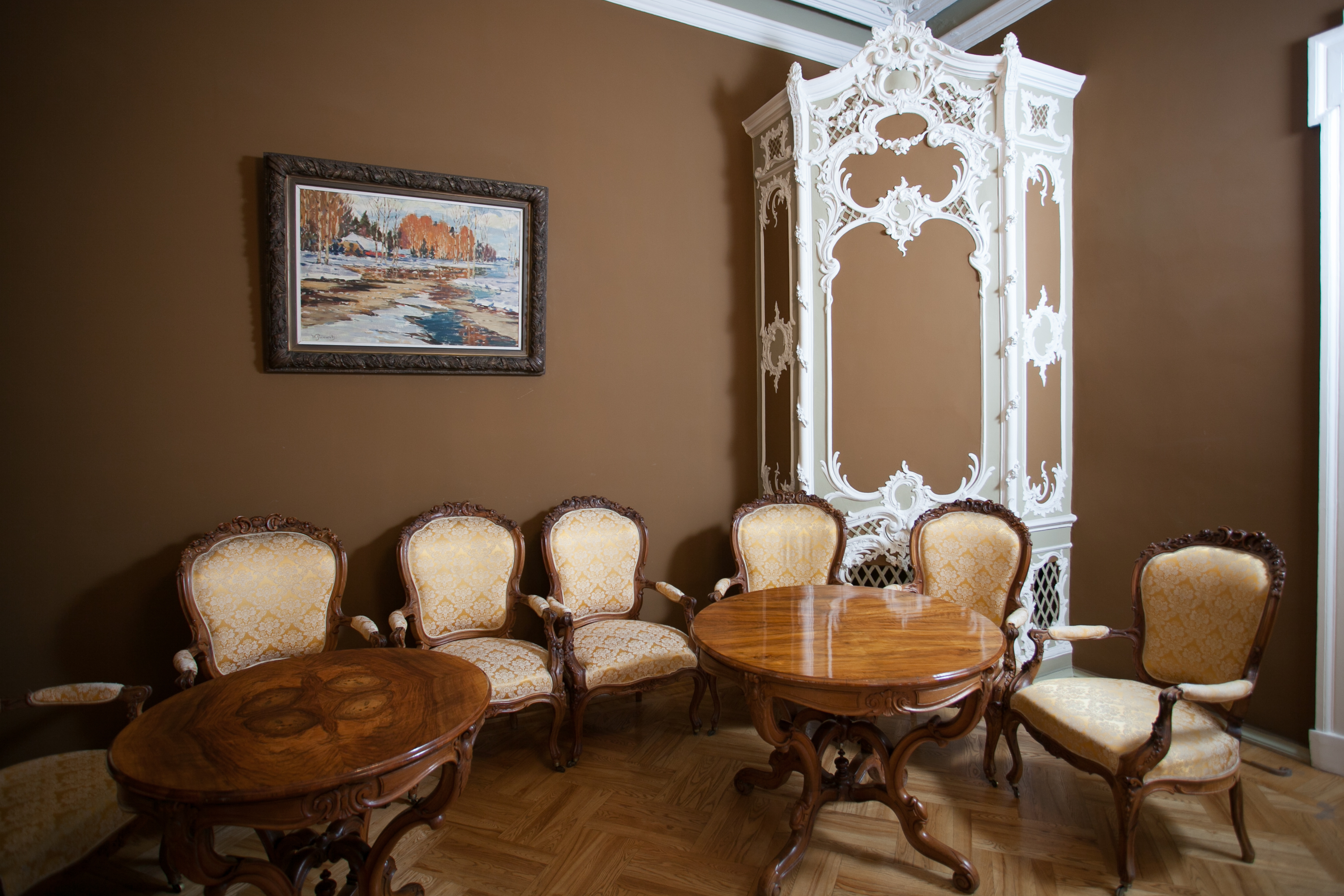
Brown Room

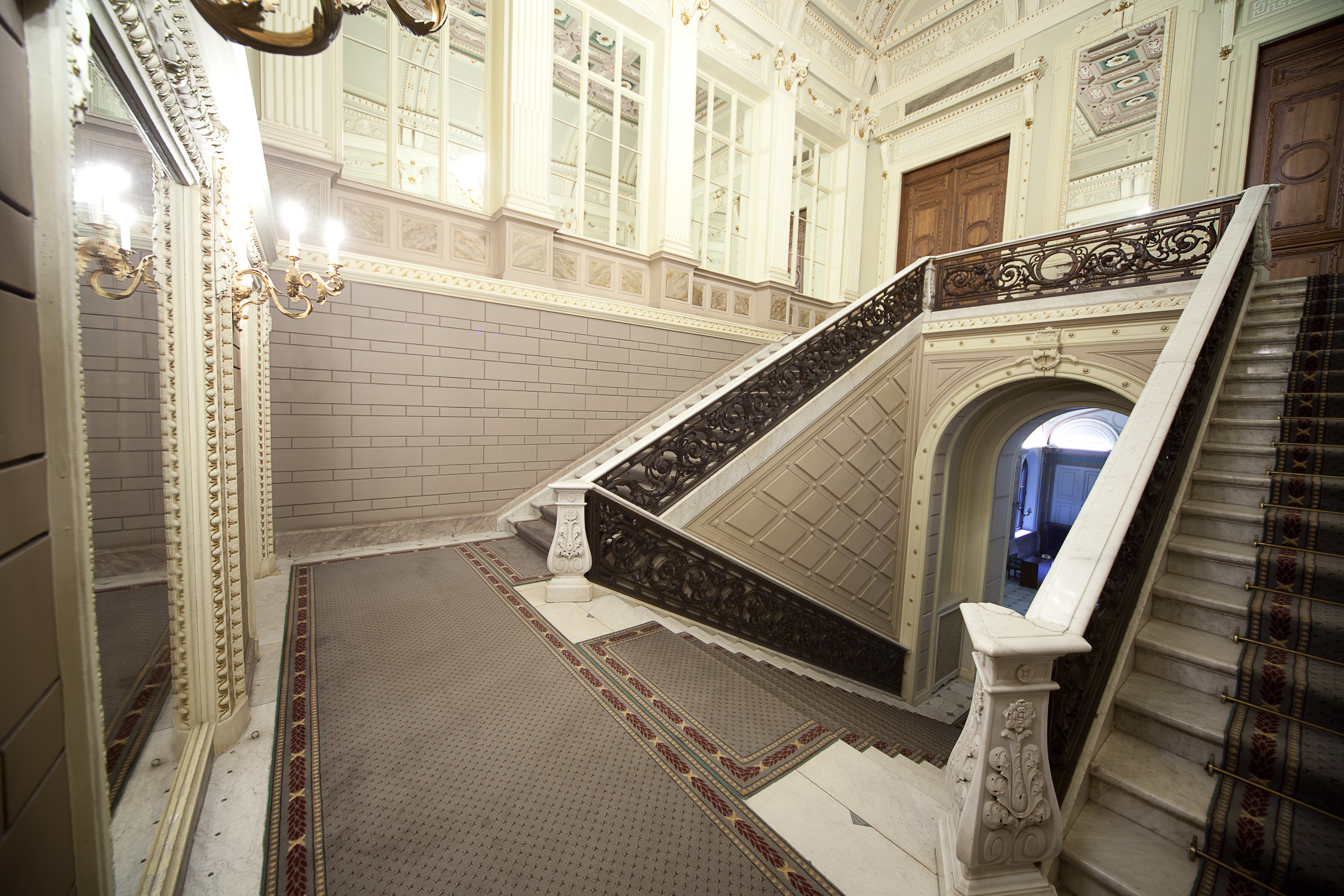
Grand Staircase

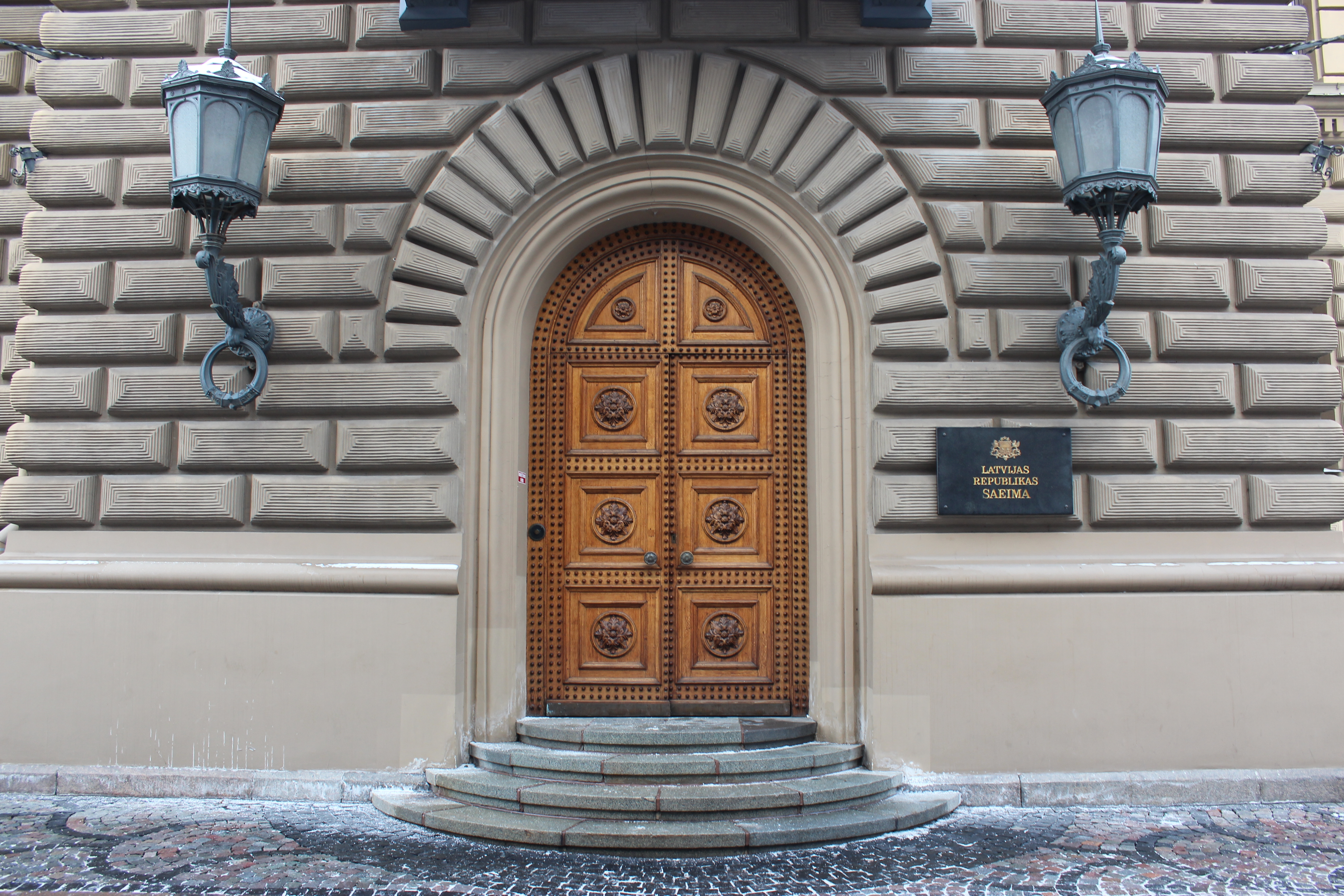
Main entrance on Klostera Street

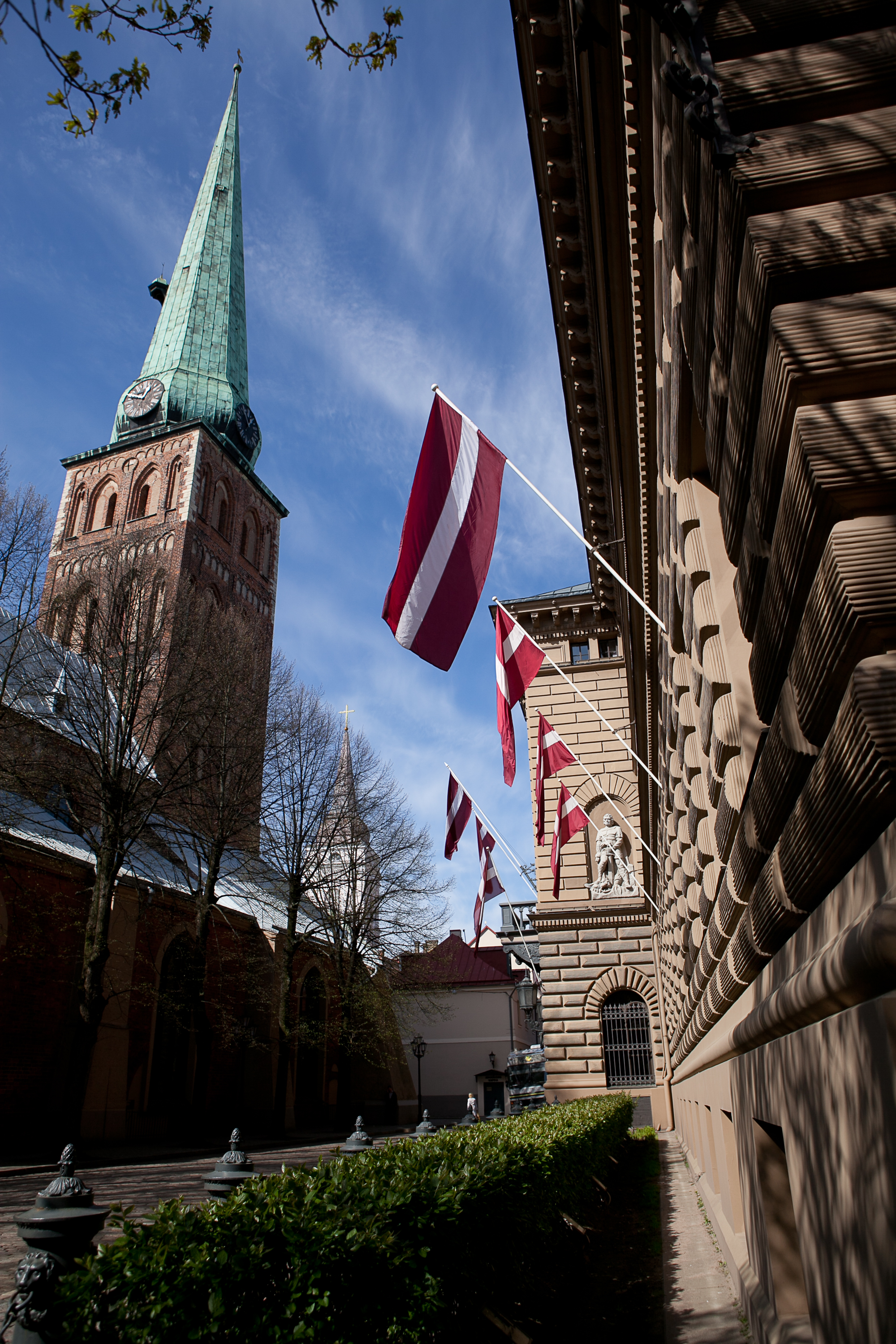
Klostera Street and St. James's Cathedral

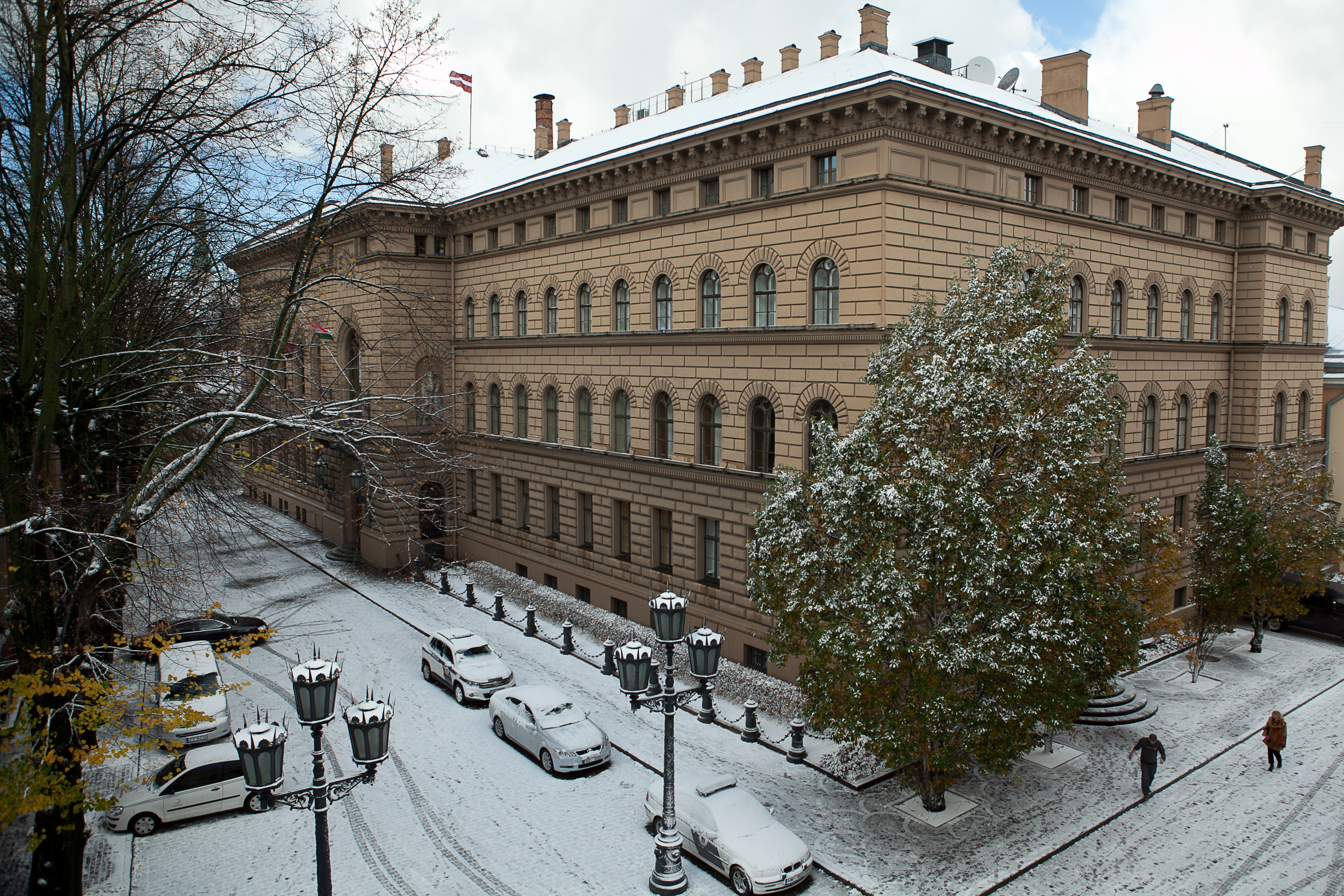
Building in Winter

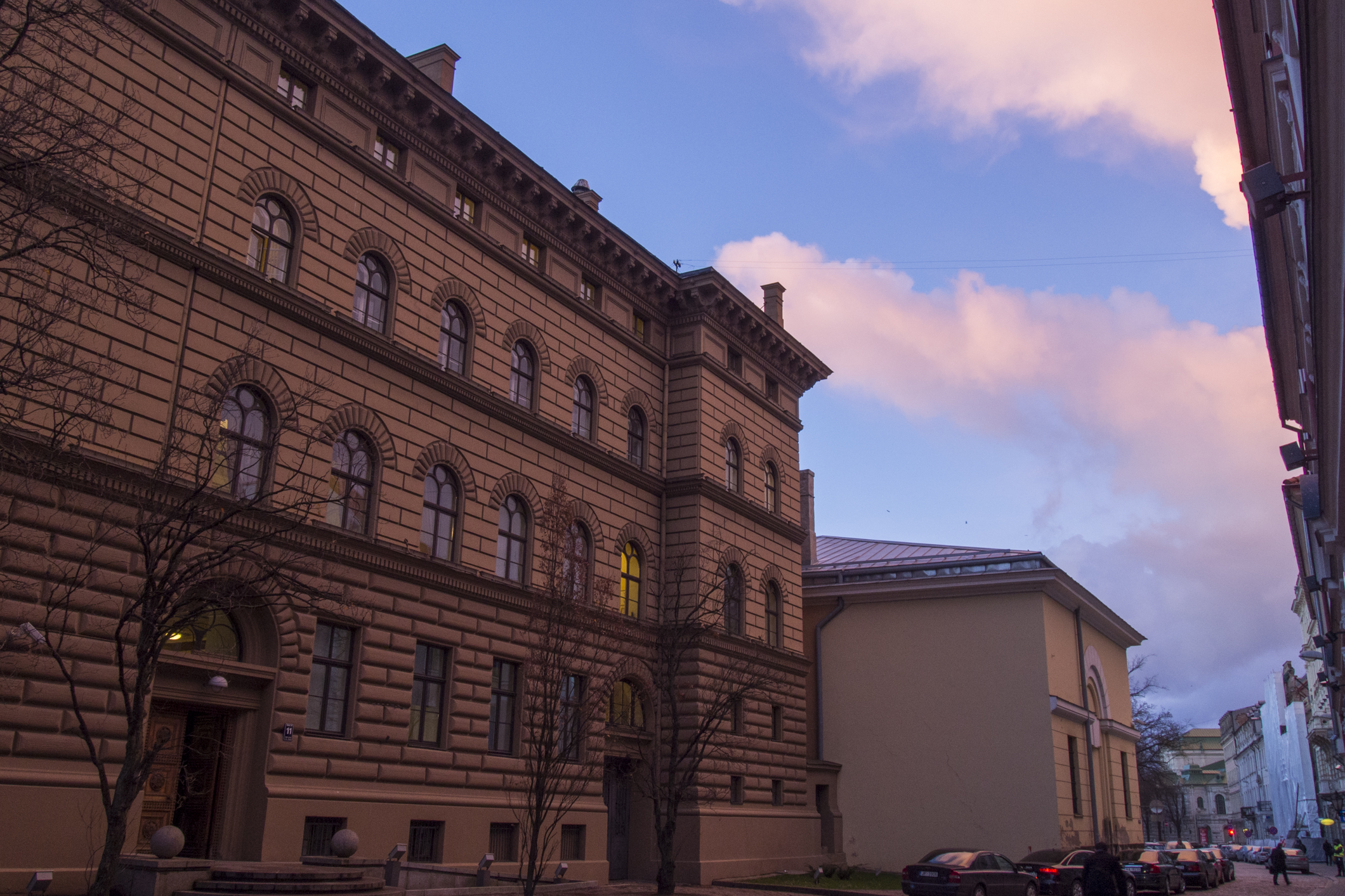
View along Jēkaba Street

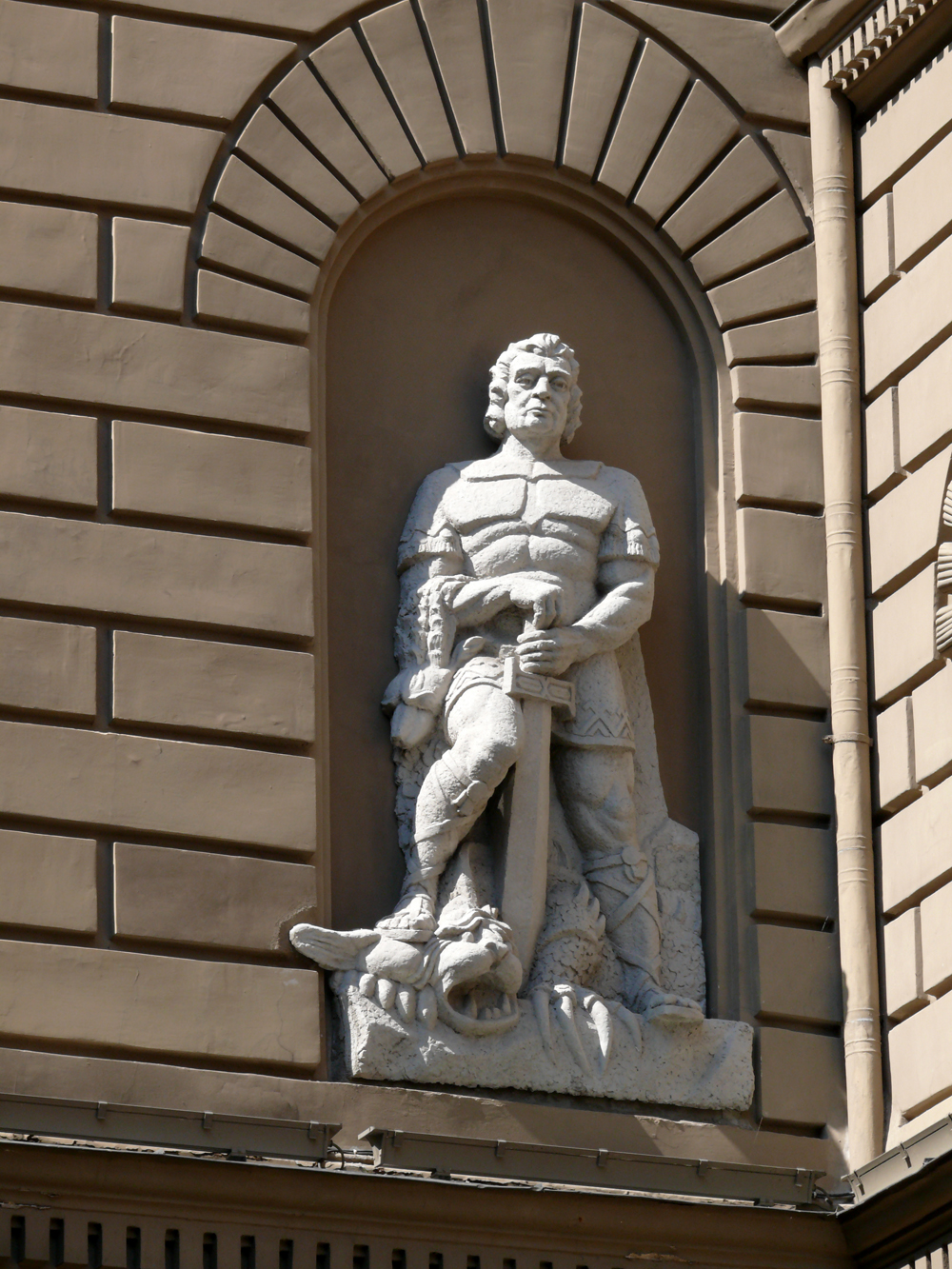
Statue of Lāčplēsis. Destroyed circa 1950s, restored 2007

== See also ==
- Government of Latvia
- Estonian Knighthood House
- Finnish House of Nobility
- Swedish House of Nobility
