= Supreme Soviet of the Latvian Soviet Socialist Republic =

Supreme Soviet of the Latvian SSR Latvijas PSR Augstākā Padome (Latvian) Верховный Совет Латвийской ССР (Russian)
- Latvian SSR (1940–1941, 1944–1990)
- Coat of arms of the Latvian Soviet Socialist Republic

Type
- Type: Supreme Soviet

History
- Established: 1940; 1947 (Re-established)
- Disbanded: 1941 (Nazi occupation); 1990
- Preceded by: People's Parliament
- Succeeded by: Supreme Council of the Republic of Latvia

Leadership
- Chairman: Anatolijs Gorbunovs (last)
- Chairman of the Presidium: Anatolijs Gorbunovs (last)

Elections
- Last election: 1990

Meeting place
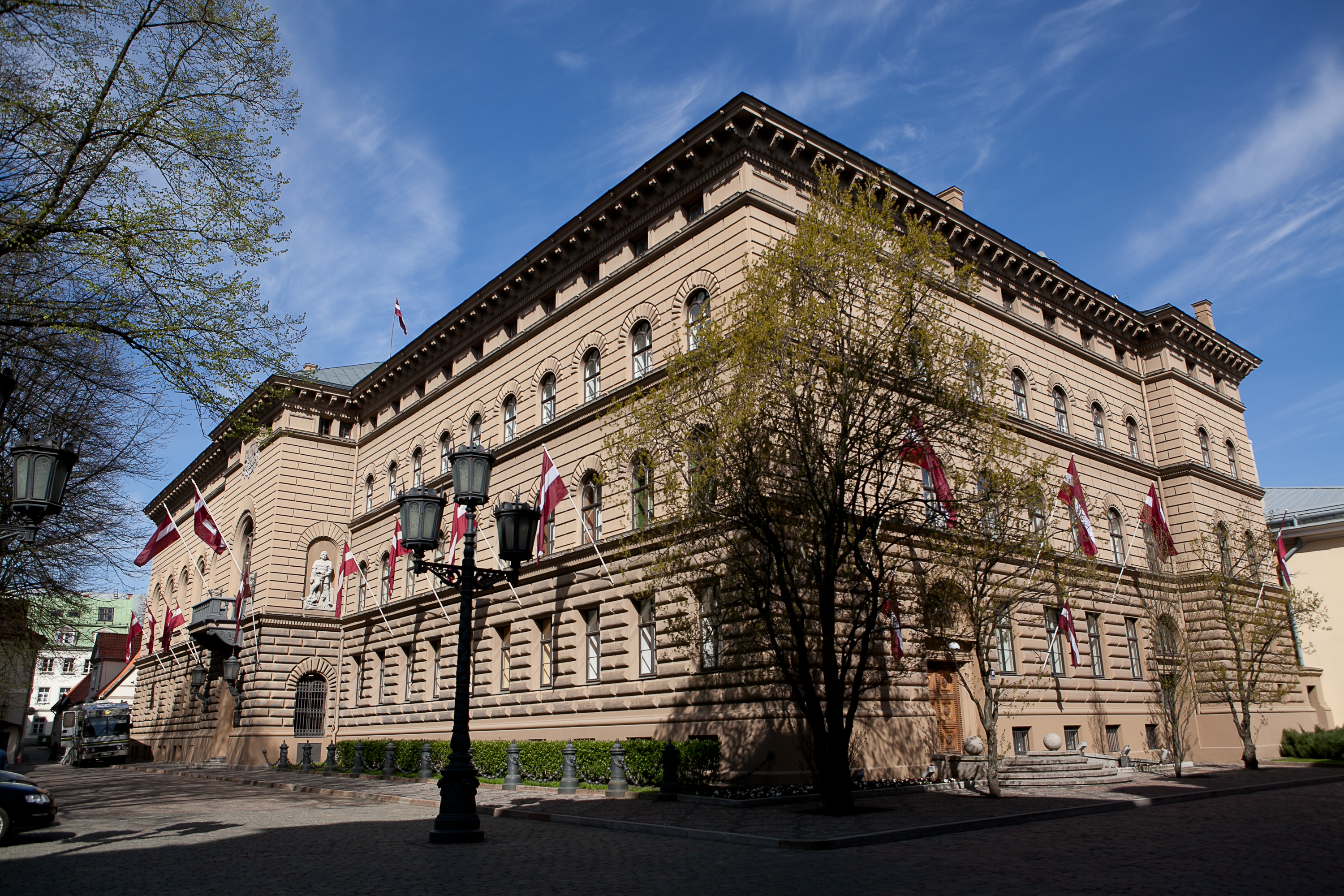
- House of the Livonian Noble Corporation, Riga, Latvian SSR, Soviet Union

The Supreme Soviet of the Latvian SSR (Latvian: Latvijas PSR Augstākā Padome; Russian: Верховный Совет Латвийской ССР, Verkhovnyy Sovet Latvyyskoy SSR) was the highest organ of state authority of the Latvian SSR, one of the union republics of the Soviet Union. The Supreme Soviet of the Latvian SSR was established in 1940 as the People's Saeima and finally disbanded in 1990 and was briefly succeeded by the Supreme Council of the Republic of Latvia. According to the 1978 Constitution of the Latvian SSR, representatives could serve an unlimited number of five-year terms. The Supreme Soviet consisted of 325 deputies before its dissolution.

== Organization ==
The structure and functions of the Supreme Soviet of the Latvian SSR were copied from the Supreme Soviet of the Soviet Union. The sessions of the Supreme Soviet lasted only a few days twice a year, and decisions were made unanimously and with minimal discussion. Elections for the Supreme Soviet were held in 1947, 1951, 1955, 1959, 1963, 1967, 1971, 1975, 1980, 1985, and 1990. The number of deputies in the Supreme Soviet was increased from 310 to 325 in the 1978 Constitution of the Latvian SSR. The Supreme Soviet of the Latvian SSR gathered and met at the House of the Livonian Noble Corporation; the building currently houses the Saeima of Latvia.

== Chairmen of the Supreme Soviet ==
Portrait	Chairman	From	To
	Aleksandrs Mazjēcis	25 August 1940	14 October 1948
	Pēteris Zvaigzne	14 October 1948	1953
	Edgars Apinis	1956	1957
	Jānis Vanags	5 June 1957	20 March 1963
	Pēteris Valeskalns	20 March 1963	7 July 1971
	Aleksandrs Mālmeisters	7 July 1971	3 July 1975
	Valentīna Klibiķe	3 July 1975	29 March 1985
	Aleksandrs Drīzulis	29 March 1985	27 July 1989
	Anatolijs Gorbunovs	27 July 1989	4 May 1990

== Chairmen of the Presidium of the Supreme Soviet ==
Portrait	Chairman	From	To
	Augusts Kirhenšteins (1872–1963)	25 August 1940	10 March 1952
	Kārlis Ozoliņš (1905–1987)	10 March 1952	27 November 1959
	Jānis Kalnbērziņš (1893–1986)	27 November 1959	5 May 1970
	Vitālijs Rubenis (1914–1994)	5 May 1970	20 August 1974
	Pēteris Strautmanis (1919–2007)	20 August 1974	22 July 1985
	Jānis Vagris (1930–2023)	22 July 1985	6 October 1988
	Anatolijs Gorbunovs (born 1942)	6 October 1988	4 May 1990

== See also ==
- On the Restoration of Independence of the Republic of Latvia
- Supreme Soviet of the Soviet Union
- Supreme Council of the Republic of Latvia
- Saeima
