= Constitutional Court of Latvia =

Constitutional Court
- Latvijas Republikas Satversmes tiesa
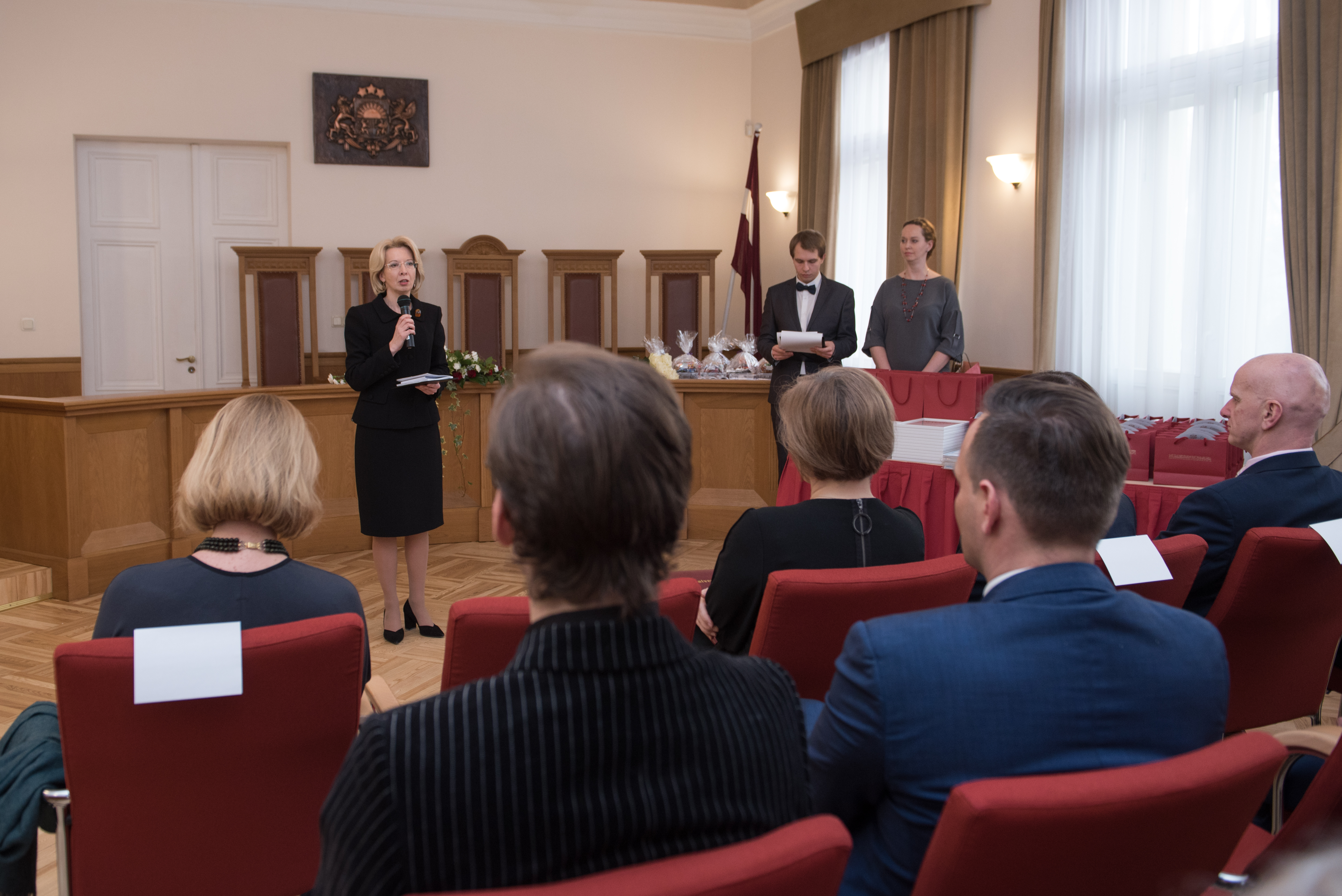
- Courtroom in 2018
- Established: 1996
- Location: Riga, Latvia
- Composition method: Elected/appointed in 3 portions by Saeima, 2 by Government of Latvia, and 2 by Supreme Court of Latvia
- Authorised by: Constitution of Latvia
- Judge term length: 10 years
- Number of positions: 7
- Website: Official website

President of the Court
- Currently: Irēna Kucina
- Since: 28 November 2024

Constitutional Court of the Republic of Latvia (Latvian: Latvijas Republikas Satversmes tiesa, also the Satversme Court) is an independent court, which was established in 1996 on basis of amendments in law "On Judicial Power" and in the Constitution of Latvia (Satversme) made in 1994. It acts in accordance with the Constitutional Court Law and the Constitution.

The court is composed of seven judges, elected for a term of ten years, from which a President of the Court and the Vice President is selected. A judge must be at least 40 years of age and resign upon reaching the age of 70. The current President of the Constitutional Court of Latvia since November 2024 is Irēna Kucina.

The Court meets in a former residential building commissioned by Emil von Boetticher (1836–1907), the Burgomaster of Riga from 1881 to 1889, and designed by architect Friedrich Wilhelm Hess, which is located at Jura Alunāna iela 1 in Riga.

Latvian legal scholars who study the constitutional court and Latvian constitutional law include Ringolds Balodis, Kristine Jarinovska, Jānis Lazdiņš, Jānis Neimanis, Sanita Osipova, Jānis Pleps, Anita Rodiņa, Artis Stucka and others.

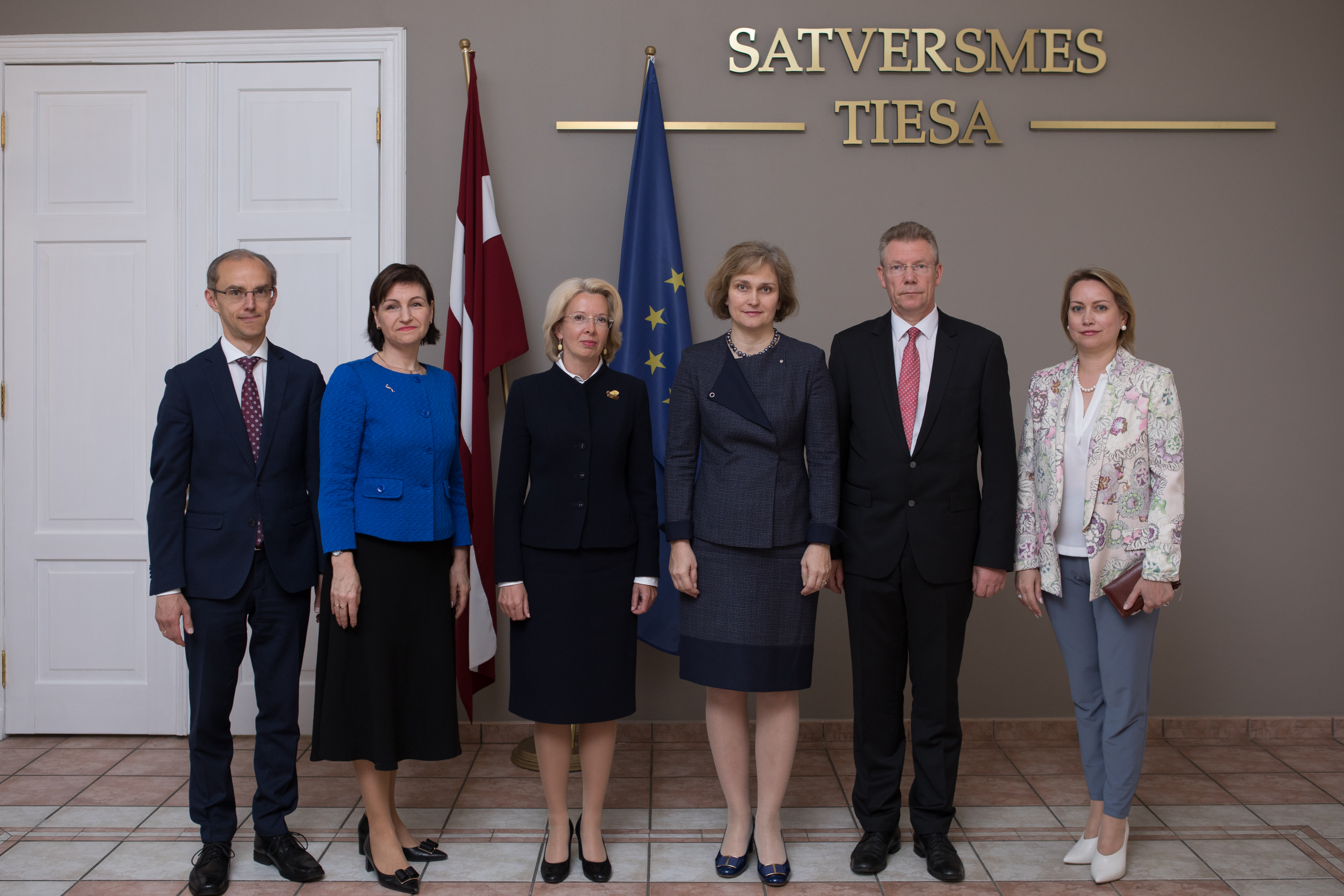
Judges of the Court during a visit by Speaker of the Saeima, Ināra Mūrniece (3rd left) in 2019. President of the Court Ineta Ziemele is to the right of her.

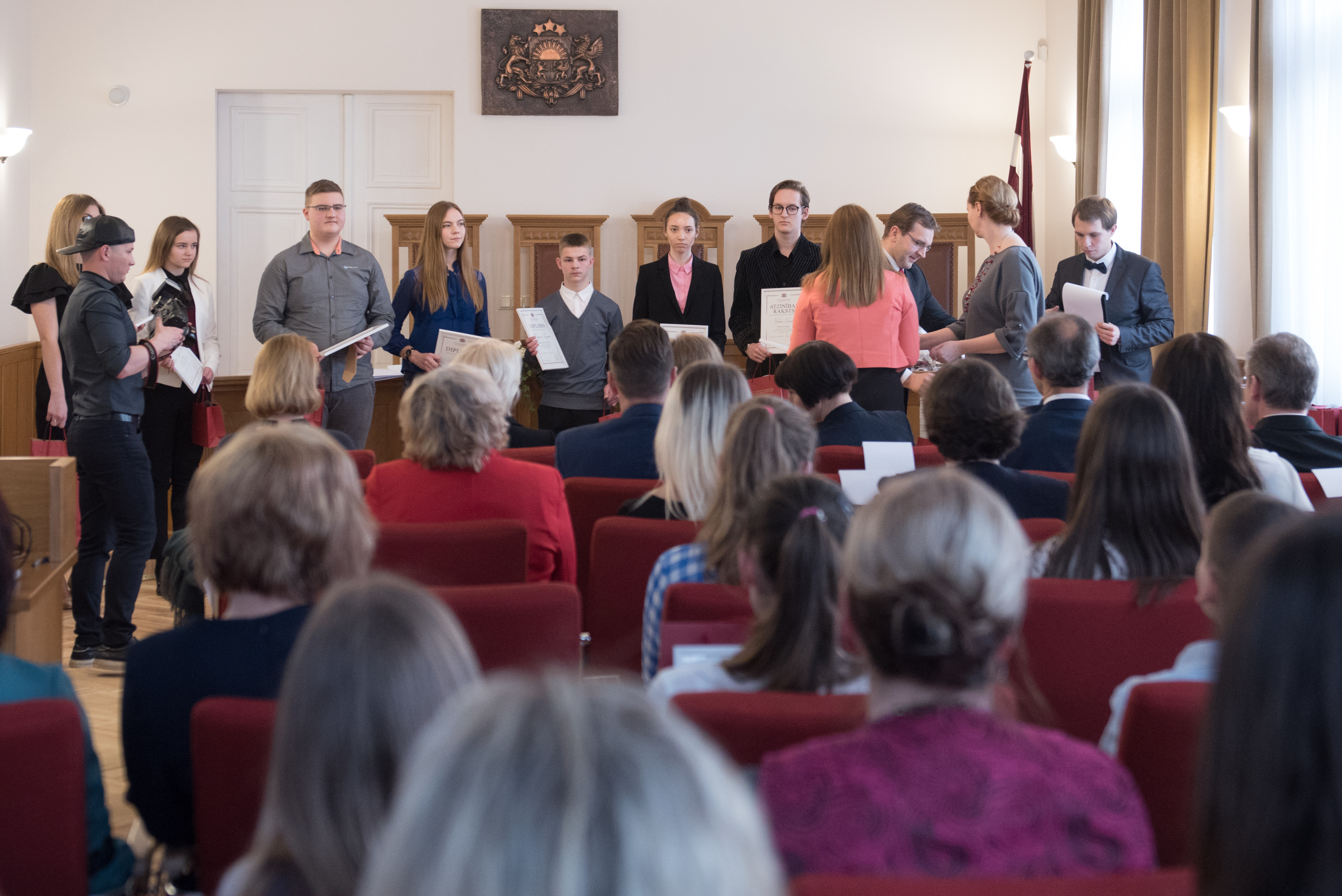
A Latvia 100 event in 2018 at the courtroom

== See also ==
- Judiciary
- Rule of law
- Rule According to Higher Law
