= People's Government =

People's Government might refer to:

- Central People's Government (since 1949), the central government of the People's Republic of China
  - Local governments at all levels in China are called "People's Government," prefixed with their regional names.
- New People's Government (1929–1931), a Korean anarchist organization in Manchuria
- Fujian People's Government (1933–1934), anti-Kuomintang government in the Fujian Province of the Republic of China
- People's Government of Lithuania (1940), Soviet-backed government to legitimize the Soviet occupation of Lithuania
- Azerbaijan People's Government (1945–1946), Soviet-backed client state in northern Iran
- People's Revolutionary Government (1979–1983), government of Grenada after a revolution by New Jewel Movement
- The People's Government (2019–2022), a name for the Second Johnson ministry used by Prime Minister Boris Johnson's Conservative government of the United Kingdom after the 2019 UK general election.
