= Supreme Council of Latvia =

Latvian transitional parliament (1990–1993)

Supreme Council of the Republic of Latvia Latvijas Republikas Augstākā Padome
- Latvia (1990–1993)
- Coat of arms of Latvia

Type
- Type: Unicameral

History
- Established: 1990
- Disbanded: 1993
- Preceded by: Supreme Soviet of the Latvian SSR
- Succeeded by: Saeima

Leadership
- Chairman: Anatolijs Gorbunovs (last)

Elections
- Last election: 1990

Meeting place
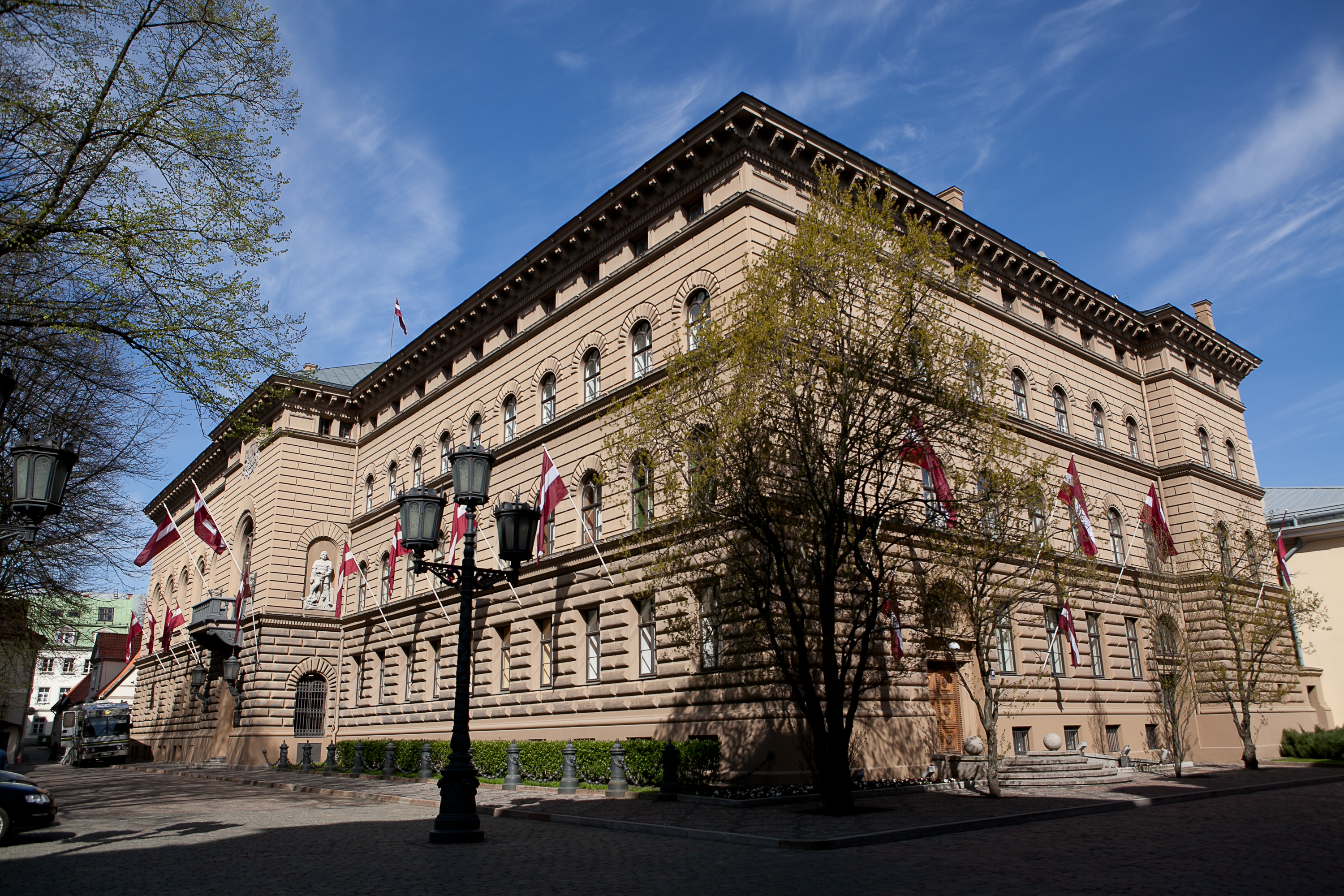
- House of the Livonian Noble Corporation, Riga, Latvia

The Supreme Council of the Republic of Latvia (Latvian: Latvijas Republikas Augstākā Padome) was the transitional parliament of Latvia from 1990 to 1993, after the restoration of independence. The Supreme Council was elected on 18 March 1990 as the Supreme Soviet of the Latvian SSR. On 4 May 1990 it declared the restoration of independence of Latvia and began a transitional period that lasted until the election of a new Saeima to replace it. Independence was fully restored on 21 August 1991 during the Soviet coup attempt. The Supreme Council ended its work in 6 July 1993, with the first session of the fifth Saeima.

== Chairman of the Supreme Council of the Republic of Latvia ==
- Anatolijs Gorbunovs (3 May 1990 – 6 July 1993)

== See also ==
- The Barricades, the last confrontation between Soviet forces against Latvian nationals
- 1991 Soviet Union referendum, where Latvians voted in favor of a new, independent republic
- 1993 Latvian parliamentary election
