= 1940 Constitution of the Latvian Soviet Socialist Republic =

Constitution of Soviet Latvia

Constitution of the Latvian Soviet Socialist Republic
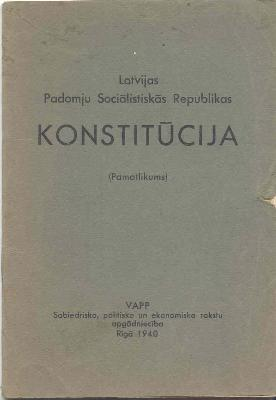

Overview
- Original title: Latvijas Padomju Sociālistiskās Republikas Konstitūcija
- Jurisdiction: Latvian Soviet Socialist Republic
- Created: 23 July 1940
- Ratified: 25 August 1940
- Date effective: 30 August 1940
- Repealed: 18 April 1978
- Author(s): People's Saeima of Latvia
- Signatories: 2 signatories (Chairman of the Provisional Presidium of the Supreme Soviet of the Latvian SSR, Secretary of the Provisional Presidium of the Supreme Soviet of the Latvian SSR)

The 1940 Constitution of the Latvian Soviet Socialist Republic (Latvian: Latvijas Padomju Sociālistiskās Republikas Konstitūcija; Russian: Конституция Латвийской Советской Социалистической Республики, romanized: Konstitutsiya Latviyskoy Sovetskoy Sotsialisticheskoy Respubliki) was the communist state constitution adopted by the 2nd session of the People's Saeima of Latvia on August 25, 1940.

The constitution was based on the 1936 Constitution of the Soviet Union. The basic provisions of both constitutions were basically same, except the second chapter of the constitution, on which Latvia retains its pre-Soviet territorial division.

== History ==
Two days after the formation of the Latvian SSR on 21 July 1940, which was formalized by the Decree of the Supreme Soviet of the USSR "On the Entry of the Latvian SSR into the Soviet Union" on 5 August 1940, the People's Saeima of Latvia formed a commission for the constitution of the Latvian SSR, which consisted of 15 deputies headed by Žanis Spure. The commission formulates the constitution by translating the 1936 Constitution of the Soviet Union and made several changes to the translated version that account the specific situation of Latvia. The final constitution symbolizes "the tremendous upsurge of the masses who overthrew the exploiting classes".

The constitution itself was approved by acclamation in the 2nd session of the People's Saeima of Latvia on August 25, 1940. The constitution was first published on the News of the Presidium of the Supreme Council of the Latvian SSR (Latvijas PSR Augstākās Padomes Prezidija Ziņotājs) on 3 October 1940. The constitution was amended in the sessions of the Supreme Soviet of the Latvian SSR. The constitution lasted for 38 years, which was replaced by the new Brezhnevist Constitution on April 18, 1978, at the extraordinary eighth session of the Supreme Soviet of the Latvian SSR.

== Structure ==
The Constitution is divided into 11 chapters and 118 articles.

1. The Organization of Society
2. The Organization of the State
3. The Highest Organs of State Authority of the Latvian SSR
4. The Organs of Government of the Latvian SSR
5. The Organs of the Local Governments
6. The Budget of the Latvian SSR
7. The Courts and the Procurator's Office
8. Fundamental Rights and Duties of Citizens
9. The Electoral System
10. Arms, Flag, Capital
11. Procedure for Amending the Constitution
