= People's Parliament =

Pro-Soviet puppet legislatures in Baltic states in 1940

People's Parliament Latvian: Tautas Saeima Lithuanian: Liaudies Seimas

History
- Preceded by: Riigikogu (Estonia); 4th Saeima (Latvia); Fourth Seimas (Lithuania)
- Succeeded by: Supreme Soviet of the Estonian SSR; Supreme Soviet of the Latvian SSR; Supreme Soviet of the Lithuanian SSR

Elections
- First election: 14–15 July 1940

The People's Parliaments or People's Assemblies (Latvian: Tautas Saeima; Lithuanian: Liaudies Seimas) were puppet legislatures put together after the show elections in Estonia, Latvia, and Lithuania to legitimize the occupation by the Soviet Union in July 1940. In all three countries, the elections to the parliaments followed the same script, dictated by functionaries in Moscow and borrowed from the examples of the incorporation of the Belarusian and Ukrainian lands into Soviet Union in the aftermath of the invasion of Poland in 1939.

== Occupation ==
On 15 and 16 June 1940, the Soviet Union presented ultimatums to all three Baltic states, which were then invaded by the Red Army. After the invasions, the previous governments of the Baltic states were replaced by pro-Communist "People's Governments". The new governments then dismissed the existing parliaments (Riigikogu in Estonia, Seimas in Lithuania) and announced new elections to the "People's Parliaments" to be held on 14 and 15 July 1940 (originally, the election in Lithuania was to be held only on 14 July, but due to low turnout, it was also extended to 15 July).

== Elections ==
Results of the show elections
Country	Turnout	Votes for the communist slate
Estonia	81.6%	92.2%
Latvia	94.7%	97.6%
Lithuania	95.5%	99.2%

Only candidates proposed by legally functioning institutions could run in each election. By that time, all non-communist parties and organizations were outlawed. The local Communist parties emerged from underground with 1,500 members in Lithuania, 500 in Latvia, and 133 in Estonia. Therefore, only the Working People's Leagues proposed candidates, exactly one per each available seat. Most candidates on its slate were non-communists, but this was not considered crucial due to the way Soviet-style regimes operated. Efforts to present alternative candidates were blocked. Repressions and terror were employed against election critics and political activists. For example, in Lithuania, some 2,000 activists were arrested on 11 June. People were coerced to vote – those who voted had their passports stamped, while anyone who did not vote was dubbed an "enemy of the people" and could expect future persecutions for "failing their political duties". The ballots had only one option – the name chosen by the Communists. According to the rigged results, Working People's Leagues candidates received over 90% of the vote. The Soviet envoy in London released election results even before the voting booths closed.

== Parliament sessions and aftermath ==
All three parliaments convened on 21 July 1940. In their first sessions, all three parliaments unanimously adopted resolutions to convert their states to Soviet Socialist Republics (SSR): the Estonian SSR, Latvian SSR, and Lithuanian SSR. They also petitioned the Supreme Soviet of the Soviet Union to accept these newly established SSRs as constituent republics of the Soviet Union. The parliaments also elected their representatives to go to Moscow and personally present their case in front of the Supreme Soviet. Other acts adopted in these early sessions concerned nationalization of virtually all larger enterprises, real estate, and land, and other Sovietization policies. The resolutions were adopted unanimously, with virtually no discussion.

On 1 August, the Baltic delegates arrived to Moscow and petitioned the Supreme Soviet. After apparent deliberation, the Lithuanian request was granted on 3 August, the Latvian request on 5 August, and the Estonian request on 6 August. As a result, the People's Parliaments reorganized themselves as Supreme Soviets of the respective SSRs. Thus the process of legitimizing the occupation was complete. Even after the dissolution of the Soviet Union, Russia officially maintains that all three Baltic states voluntarily joined the Union.

== See also ==
- People's Seimas, the parliament in Soviet-occupied Lithuania
- People's Saeima, the parliament in Soviet-occupied Latvia
- II Riigivolikogu (2nd State Council), the parliament in Soviet-occupied Estonia
