= House of Nobility =

House of Nobility can refer to the following historical Nordic noble estate's assemblies:

- Swedish House of Nobility
- Finnish House of Nobility
- Estonian Knighthood House
- House of the Livonian Noble Corporation
