= Estonian Knighthood House =

Building in Tallinn

Coordinates: 59°26′13″N 24°44′24″E

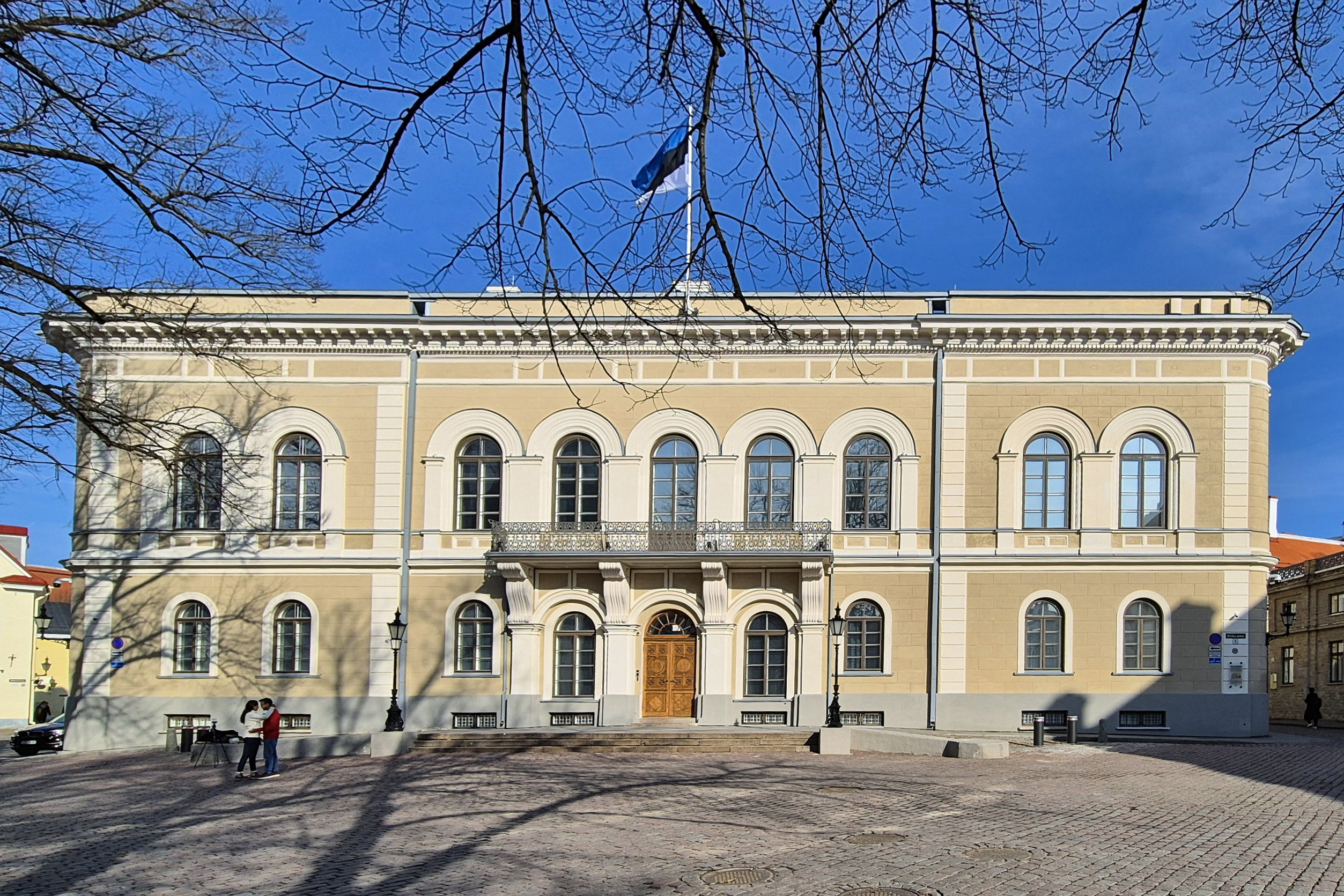
The Estonian Knighthood House

The Estonian Knighthood House (Estonian: Eestimaa rüütelkonna hoone, German: Haus der Estländischen Ritterschaft) is a building in Toompea, the upper part of Vanalinn, the historic inner town of Tallinn, the capital of Estonia. Its address is Kiriku plats (Dome Square) 1. The Dome Church is situated at the same square.

== History ==
Estonia was occupied by the Livonian Brothers of the Sword, a religious order of German nobles, in the 13th century. Since then German nobles were the actual rulers in Estonia. They stayed in power when Estonia was occupied by Sweden in the 17th century and by the Russian Empire in the 18th century. Apart from a few Russians, all magistrates were German nobles. As large landowners they also possessed large parts of the Estonian soil. There were also many German nobles who opted for a career in the Imperial Russian Army.

The German nobles in Estonia were united in the Estonian Knighthood. The Estonian Knighthood House was the building where the Knights met and held their festivities and where their peerage register was kept.

The present building is the fourth Knighthood House. The first two were lost in fire and the third House soon became too small. The present building in Renaissance Revival style was designed by the architect Georg Winterhalter (1822–1894) and built in the years 1845-1848.

In 1920, when Estonia had become independent, all privileges of the German Knights were cancelled. The building was then put into use as Estonia's Ministry of Foreign Affairs.

After the Soviet occupation of Estonia in 1940 the country had no Ministry of Foreign Affairs of its own anymore. Between 1948 and 1992 the building functioned as National Library of Estonia. In 1992 the book collection was transferred to a newly built library in the subdistrict of Tõnismäe.

In 1993 a part of the art collection from Kadriorg Palace was accommodated in the Estonian Knighthood House. Kadriorg Palace needed a restoration; moreover, in the subdistrict of Kadriorg a new art museum was being built, so that the collection could be extended too.

After 2000 the art collection was gradually returned to the restored Kadriorg Palace and the newly built Kumu (an abbreviation of Kunstimuuseum). Since 2009 the Estonian Knighthood House houses the Estonian Academy of Arts, but that will move too. In 2016 the Estonian Academy of Arts will move into a reconstructed historical factory building in the Kalamaja quarter at the corner of Kotzebue tänav and Põhja puiestee.

== Gallery ==
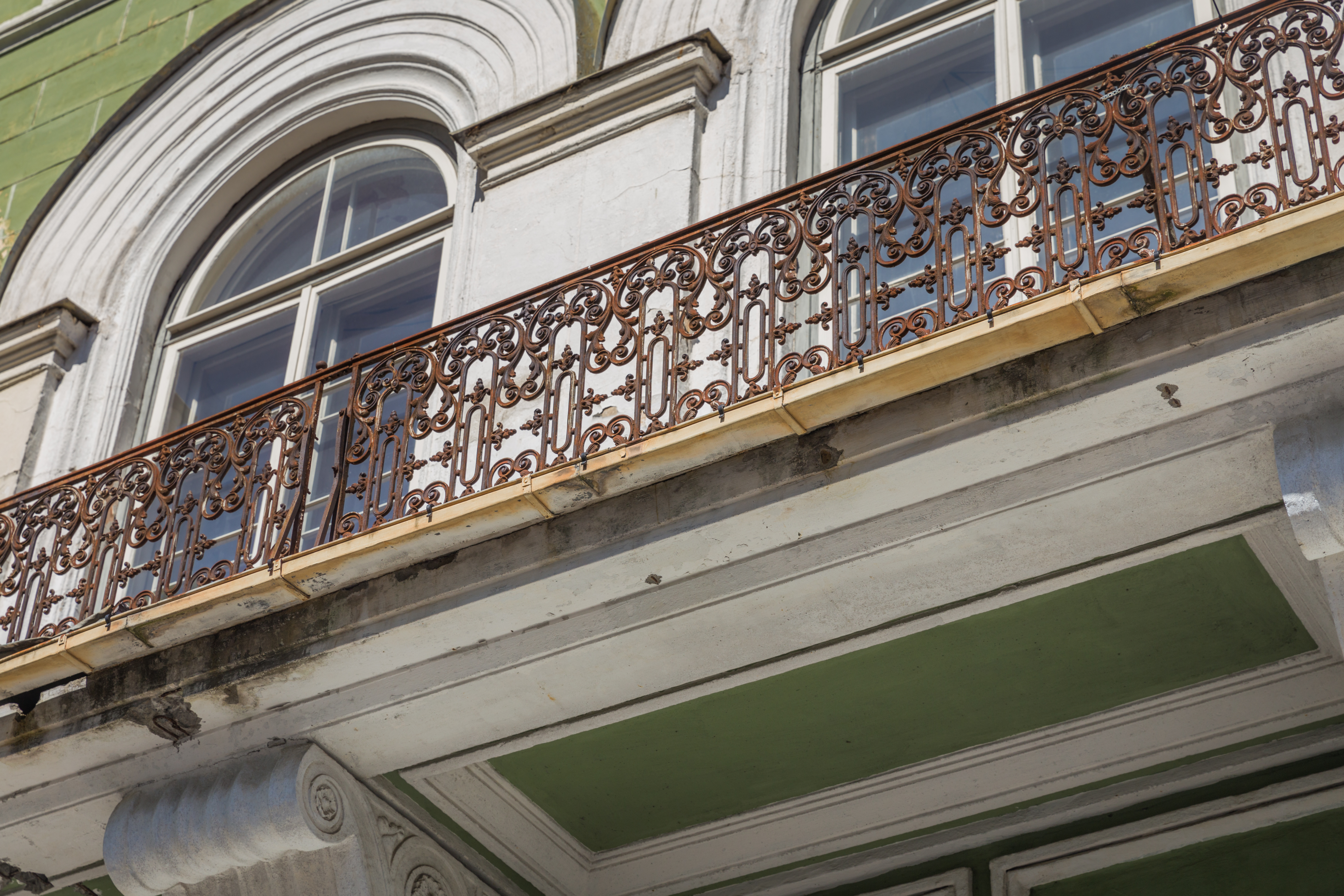

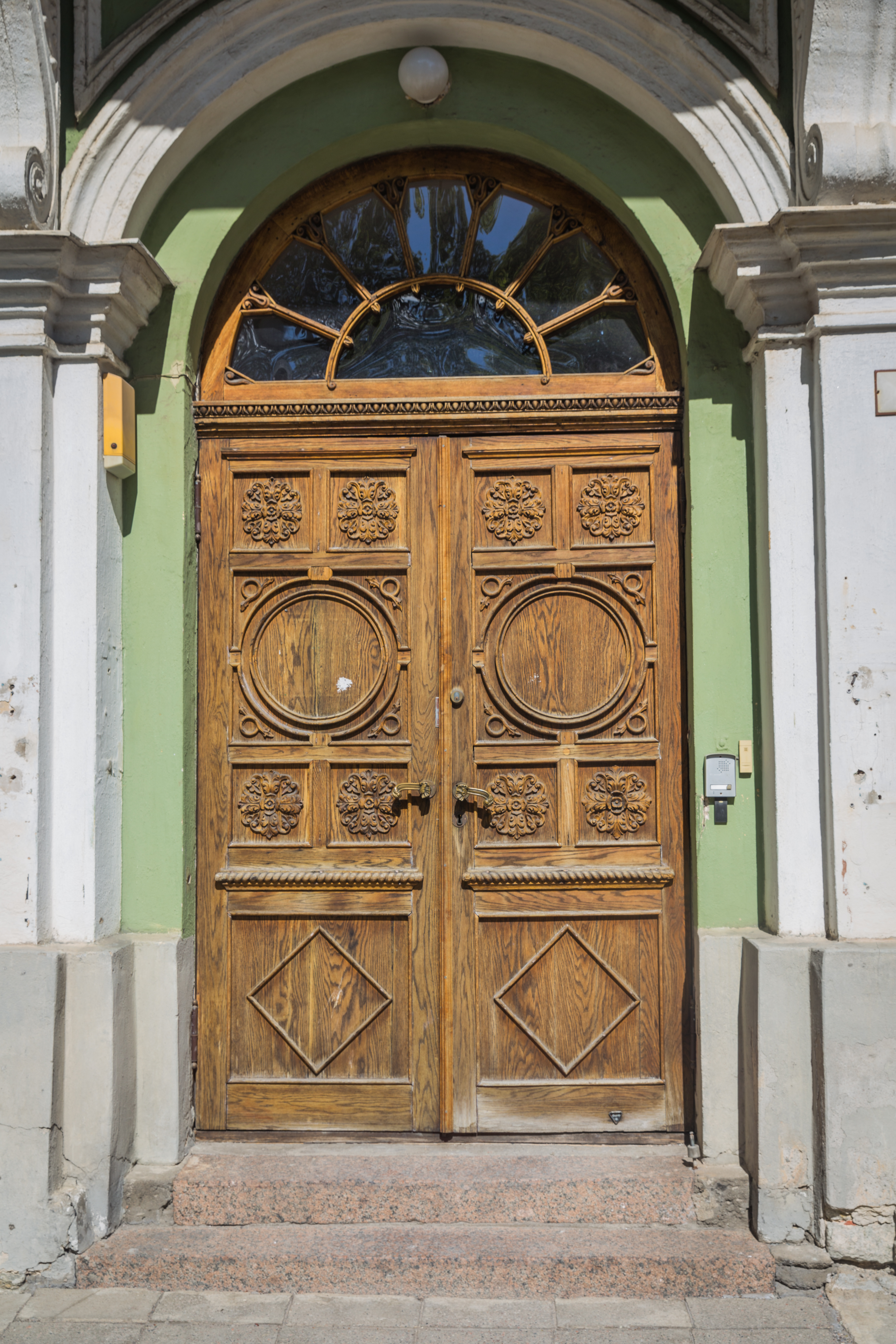

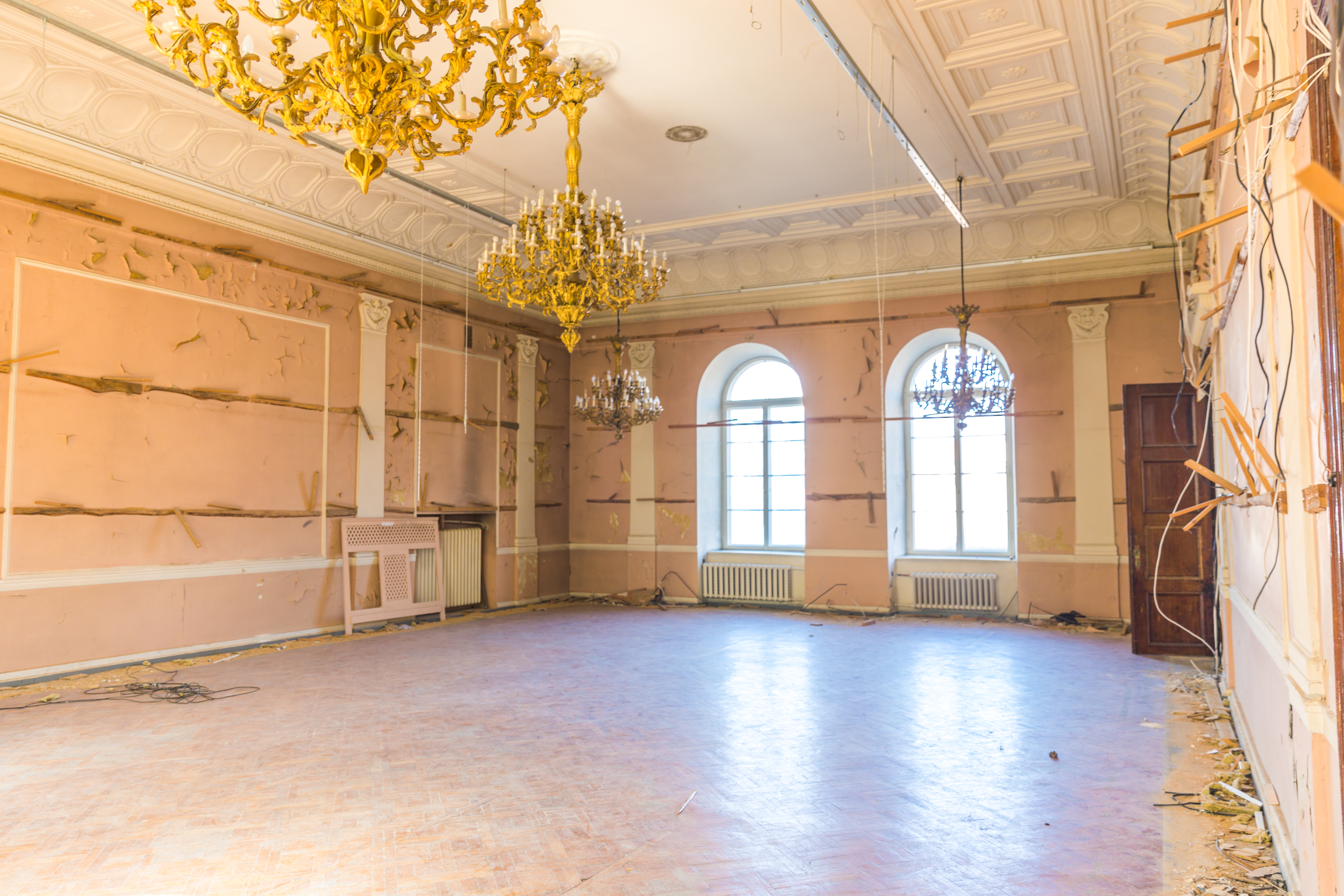

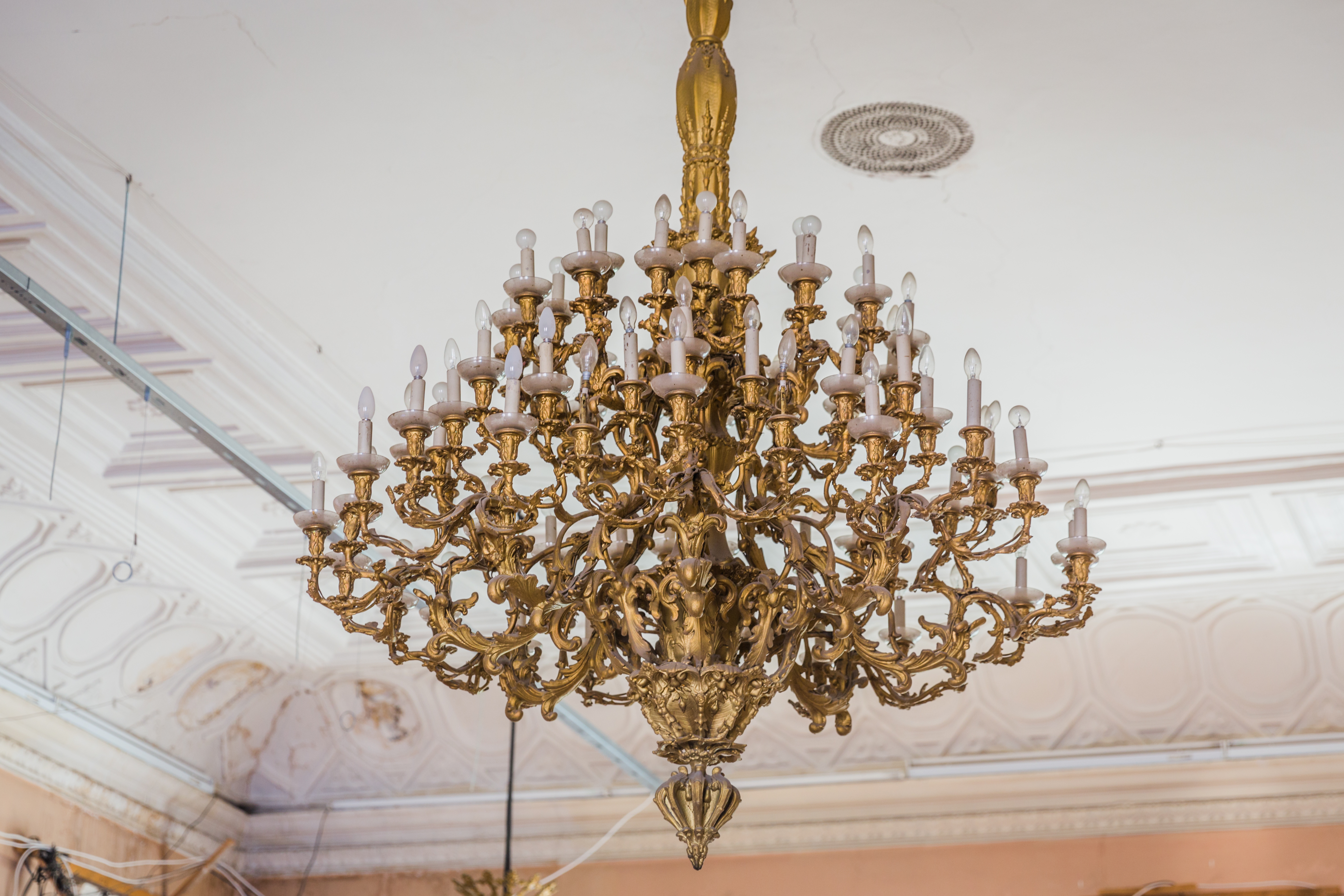

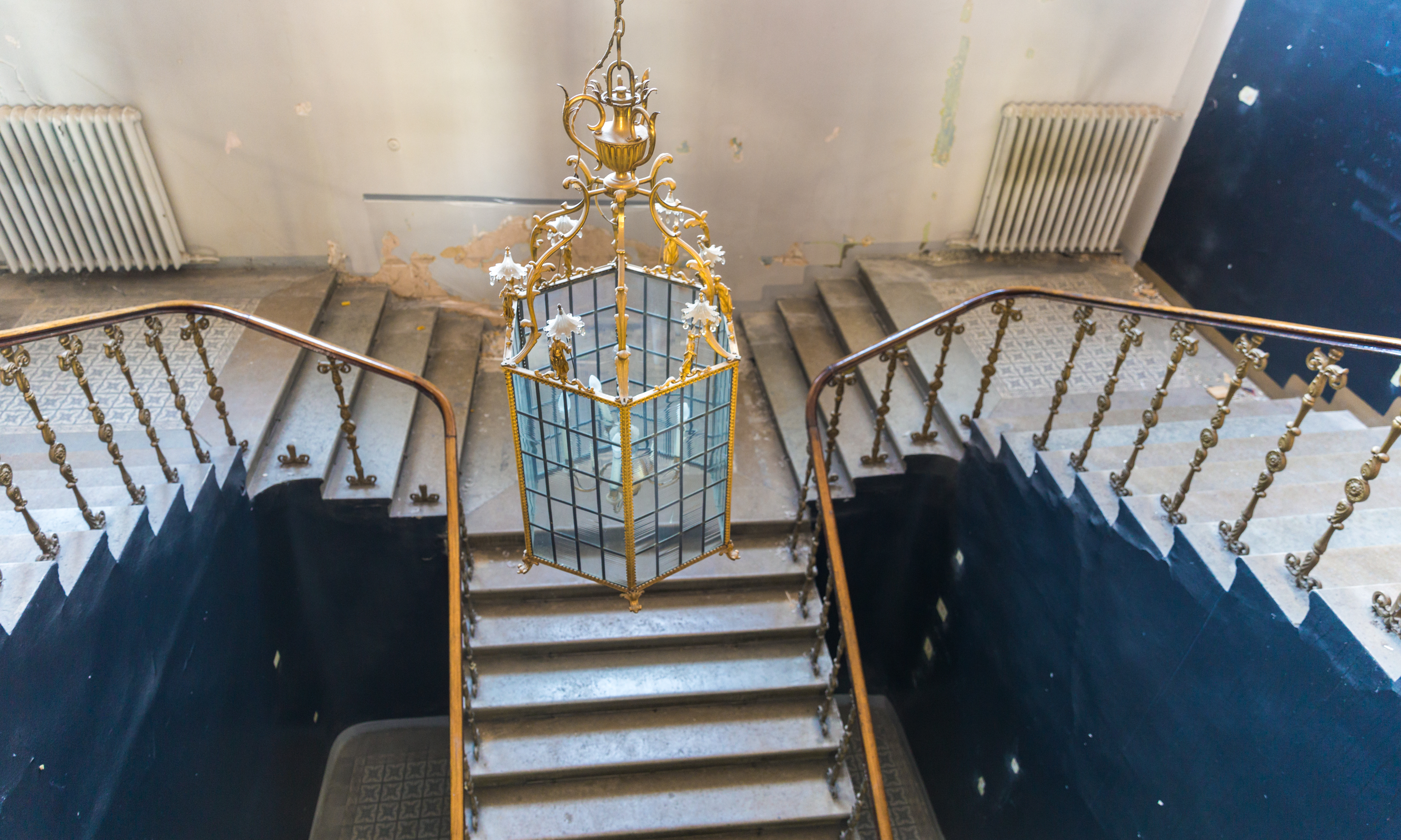

== See also ==
- House of the Livonian Noble Corporation
- House of Nobility
  - Swedish House of Nobility
  - Finnish House of Nobility
