= Livonian Knighthood =

Noble corporation in Livonia

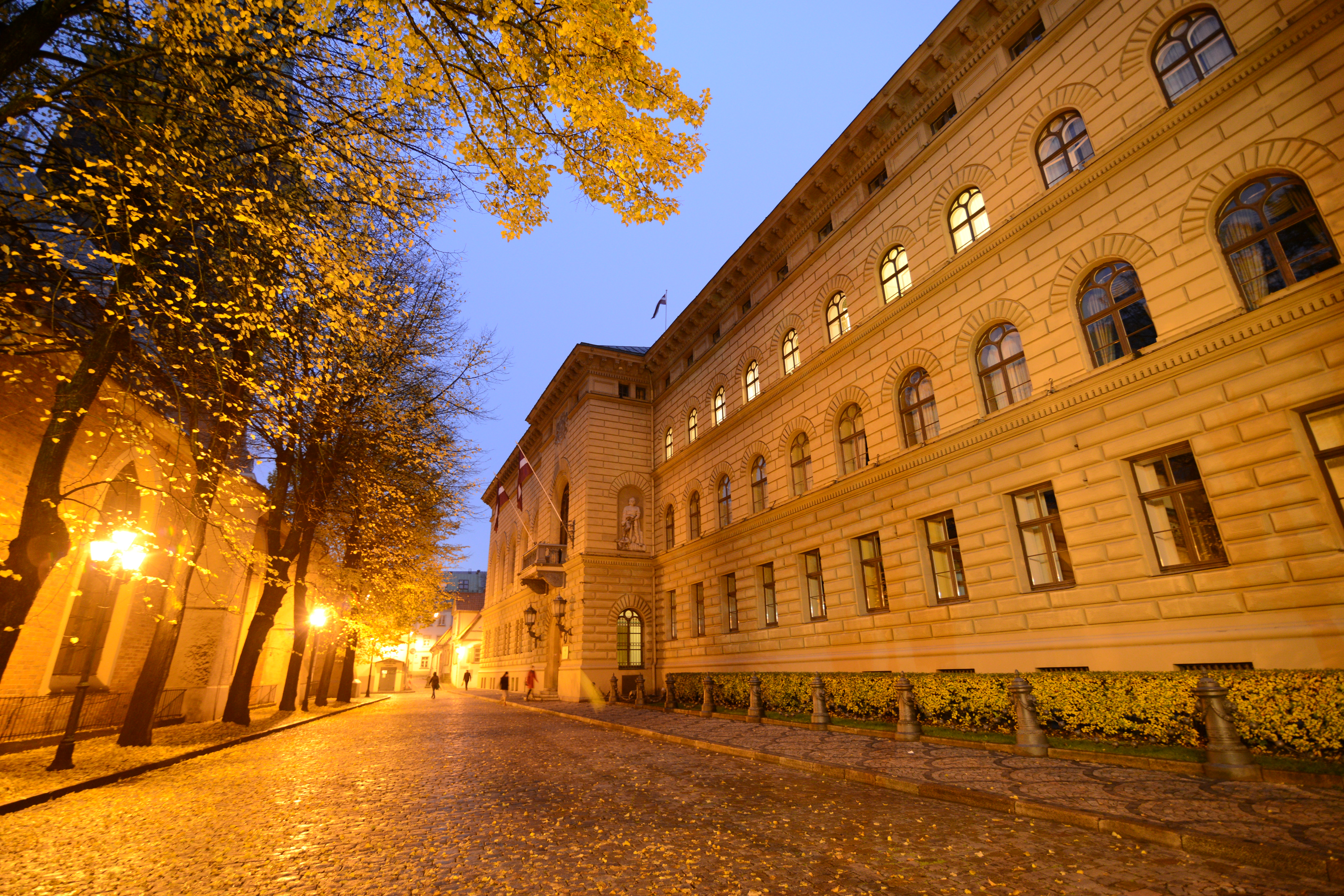
The House of the Livonian Noble Corporation in Riga, now used by the Saeima.

The Livonian Knighthood (German: Livländische Ritterschaft, Estonian: Liivimaa rüütelkond, Latvian: Livonijas bruņniecība) was a fiefdom that existed in Livonia (now Southern Estonia and Northern Latvia). It was formed in 1561 by Baltic German nobles and disbanded in 1917 in Estonia, and in 1920 in Latvia. Like other Baltic knighthoods, the Livonian also had semi-autonomous privileged status in the Russian Empire.

== History ==
Within the individual territories Old Livland the vassal genders joined forces to defend and maintain their rights and possessions into knighthoods. These corporate organizations were already provided with sovereign rights in the 14th century and were officially recognized.

The privileges of the knighthood were each confirmed by changing sovereigns, so happened in 1561 by the King of Poland Sigismund II August, 1629 by Gustav II Adolf, the king of Sweden, and in 1710 by the Russian Tsar Peter I.

Through the agricultural legislation of the years 1816 to 1819, the landowning nobility of the Baltic governorates were given the right and duty to set up elementary schools (also called "peasant schools") in the estate districts and villages belonging to them. For instance, issues of education of the rural population in the Livonian Knights' Landtag repeatedly gave rise to debates the Conservatives and Reformers in the Livonian nobility, as well as in the Livonian provincial synod of the Evangelical Lutheran Church.

In the wake of the October Revolution in Russia in 1917 and the turmoil of World War I, Estonia declared its independence from Russia on February 24, 1918, and Latvia on November 18, 1918, as republics. Attempts by the German Empire to bring the Baltic politically under German sovereignty with the creation of the United Baltic Duchy failed in November 1918 finally. The Livonian Knighthood was subsequently dissolved as statutory corporation.

In 1920, the Livonian Non-profit Association was founded in Riga, and the members of the Knights, who had emigrated to the German Reich, founded the Association of the Livonian Stammadel in Rostock. These associations continued the tradition of knighthood. In 1949, the present Association of Baltic Noble Corporations e.V. founded in which the Livonian knighthood is integrated together with its three sister Nobel communities.

== The coat of arms of the Livonian knighthood ==
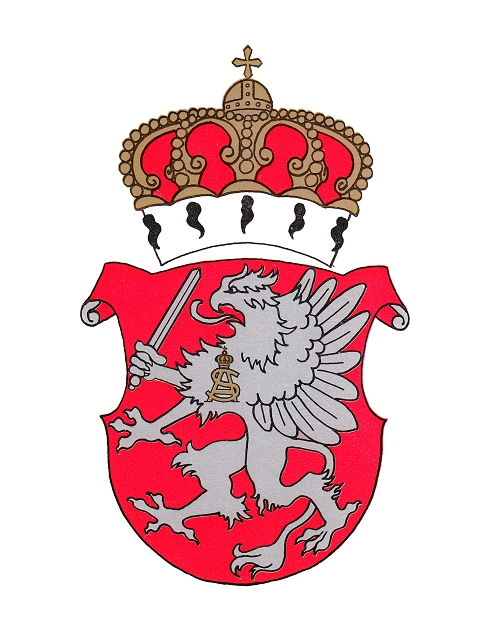
The Coat of arms.

The coat of arms of the Livonian knighthood was awarded by the Grand Duke of Lithuania in 1566 on the occasion of the real union between the Grand Duchy of Lithuania and the Duchy of Livonia. It is the coat of arms of the Livonian administrator and commander Jan Hieronimowicz Chodkiewicz with the initials of King Sigismund II Augustus.

== Land Marshals of the Livonian Knights ==
From 1695 to 1710 there were "Landtag directors" and from 1783 to 1797 "Marshal of Nobility".

- 1643: Otto von Mengden
- 1643: Engelbrecht by Mengden
- 1645: Johann Eberhard von Bellingshausen
- 1646: Henry of Cronstians
- 1646: Ernst von Mengden
- 1648-1650: Hermann von Gordian
- 1650-1653: Gustav Adolf Clodt of Jürgensburg
- 1653-1660: Gustav von Mengden
- 1660-1664: Gustav Carl von Wulffen
- 1664-1667: Gotthard Johann von Budberg
- 1667-1673: Jacob Stael von Holstein
- 1669-1670: Johann von Buddenbrock
- 1673-1676: Otto Friedrich von Vietinghoff
- 1676-1680: Ernst Johann von Rosen
- 1680-1683: Otto Reinhold von Albedyll
- 1683-1690: Georg (Jürgen) Conrad von Ungern-Sternberg
- 1690-1693: Johann Heinrich Streiff von Lauenstein
- 1695, 1697: Gustav Ernst von Albedyll
- 1697: Ernst von Plater
- 1699-1700: Leonhard Gustav von Budberg
- 1710: Georg Reinhold von Tiesenhausen
- 1710: Johann Albrecht von Mengden
- 1710-1712: Magnus Gustav von Mengden
- 1712-1717: Magnus Johann von Plater
- 1715-1729: Berend Dietrich von Bock (Dorpater circle)
- 1720-1723: Woldemar Johann von Ungern-Sternberg (Dorpater circle)
- 1717-1721: Otto Christoph von Richter
- 1723-1727: Gotthard Wilhelm von Budberg
- 1727-1730: Gotthard Wilhelm von Berg
- 1730-1737: Caspar Friedrich von Buddenbrock
- 1737-1742: Johann Gustav von Budberg
- 1742-1747: Heinrich Gustav von Patkul
- 1747-1759: Gustav Heinrich von Igelström
- 1759-1765: Leonhard Johann von Budberg
- 1765: Adolf Heinrich von Anrep
- 1769-1775: Carl Gustav von Mengden
- 1775-1777: Caspar Heinrich von Rosenkampf
- 1777-1783: Franz Wilhelm von Rennenkampff
- 1783-1786: Leonhard Johann von Budberg
- 1786-1792: Moritz Friedrich von Gersdorff
- 1792-1797: Friedrich von Sievers
- 1797: Otto Johann Magnus of Richter
- 1798-1800: Christian Friedrich von Ungern-Sternberg
- 1800-1803: Gustav Johann von Buddenbrock
- 1803-1806: Carl Gustav von Samson-Himmelstjerna
- 1808-1809: Carl Johann von Numers
- 1809-1812: Andreas von Below
- 1812-1818: Friedrich Reinhold Schoultz of Ascheraden
- 1818-1822: Friedrich von Löwis of Menar
- 1822-1824: Otto von Richter (vicar)
- 1824-1827: Georg Carl von Jarmersted
- 1827-1830: Friedrich Johann von Löwenwolde
- 1830-1833: Friedrich von Grote
- 1833-1836: Carl Gotthard von Liphart
- 1836-1838: Eduard von Richter
- 1839-1842: Alexander of Oettingen
- 1842-1844: Ferdinand August Nikolaus von Hagemeister
- 1844-1848: Carl Reinhold Georg von Lilienfeld
- 1848-1851: Hamilcar von Fölkersahm
- 1851-1854: Gustav Fromhold of Nolcken
- 1854-1856: Christian von Stein
- 1857-1862: August Georg Friedrich von Oettingen
- 1862-1866: Paul von Lieven
- 1866-1869: Georg Carl von Lilienfeld
- 1869-1870: Gustav Fromhold of Nolcken
- 1870-1872: Nikolai Conrad Peter of Oettingen
- 1872-1884: Heinrich Anton Hermann von Bock
- 1884-1908: Friedrich von Meyendorff
- 1906-1918: Adolf Pilar von Pilchau
- 1918-1919: Heinrich Eduard von Stryk

== See also ==
- Baltic nobility
- Governorate of Livonia
- Estonian Knighthood
