= Estonian Knighthood =

Noble corporation in Livonia

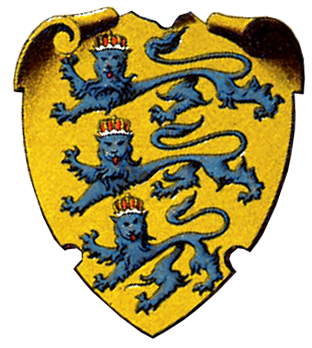
The coat of arms of the Estonian Knighthood.

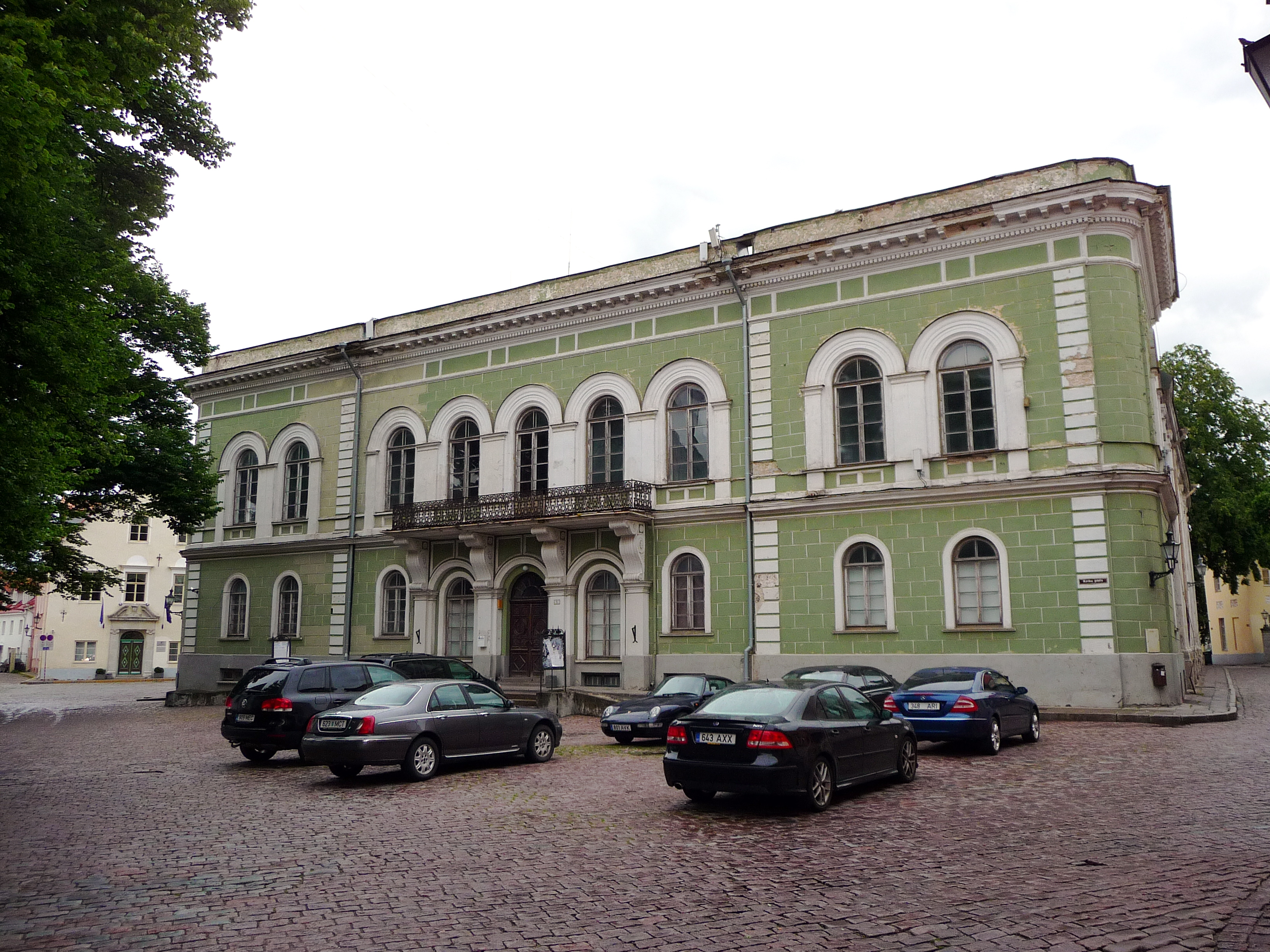
The former Knighthood House in Tallinn.

The Estonian Knighthood (German: Estländische Ritterschaft, Estonian: Eestimaa rüütelkond) was a medieval fiefdom, as well as a corporation of its nobility, that was organised and operated in what is now northern Estonia from the 13th to early 20th century. It was formally disbanded by the newly independent Republic of Estonia in 1920.

The earliest written records of the Knighthood are known from 1252, its origins thus dating back to the time of Danish rule over the northern Estonian provinces of Revala, Vironia and Harria. The evolution of the Middle Low German-speaking Knighthood from a corporation into a political entity was completed by the end of the rule of the Teutonic Order in 1561, resulting in it becoming the dominant power in the whole northern Estonia, excluding the cities – Tallinn (Reval), Rakvere (Wesenberg), Narva (Narwa), Haapsalu (Hapsal), and Paide (Weissenstein).

The Knighthood managed to maintain its dominant role and a semi-autonomous privileged status throughout the time when northern Estonia was part of the Kingdom of Sweden (1561—1710) and the Russian Empire (until World War I). Just like for the other Baltic knighthoods, for the local German-speaking nobility in Estonia, this meant that the practice of the Protestant-Lutheran faith (of the Augsburg Confession) was guaranteed along with the use of German as the administrative language and local autonomy for the Knighthood in the administration of the land and the application of the law to its population.

After World War II, the Estonian Knighthood exists as a Baltic German nobility association in Germany, part of the united Baltic German Knighthoods association.

== See also ==
- Estonian Knighthood House
- Governorate of Estonia
- Livonian Knighthood
- Curonian Knighthood
- Saaremaa Knighthood
