= Roberts Mūrnieks =

- Born: 4 July 1952; Pelši, Preiļi district, Latvian SSR, Soviet Union (modern-day Latvia)
- Died: 16 January 1991 (aged 38); Riga, Latvia
- Occupation: Driver

Roberts Mūrnieks (4 July 1952 – 16 January 1991) was the first person killed by Soviet OMON during the Barricades in 1991 in Latvia. His funeral became a public protest against Soviet occupation and aggression in Latvia.

== Biography ==
Mūrnieks was born on 4 July 1952 in Pelši, Preiļi district in the Latvian Soviet Socialist Republic, which today is Latvia. He went to Preiļi High School No.1, but moved to Riga with his family after 5th grade. In 1991, Mūrnieks was working for the Ministry of Transport as a driver, when he was shot in the head near Vecmīlgrāvis bridge during the events of the Barricades. He died from the injury on 16 January 1991, at Riga Hospital No.1.

On 17 January, the Supreme Council of Latvia expressed condolences for Mūrnieks' death, saying it was as a result of banditry by a militia unit of the Ministry of Internal Affairs of the USSR, and created a commission to organise his funeral. He was buried in Mārupe Cemetery, and his funeral became a focal point of popular protest.

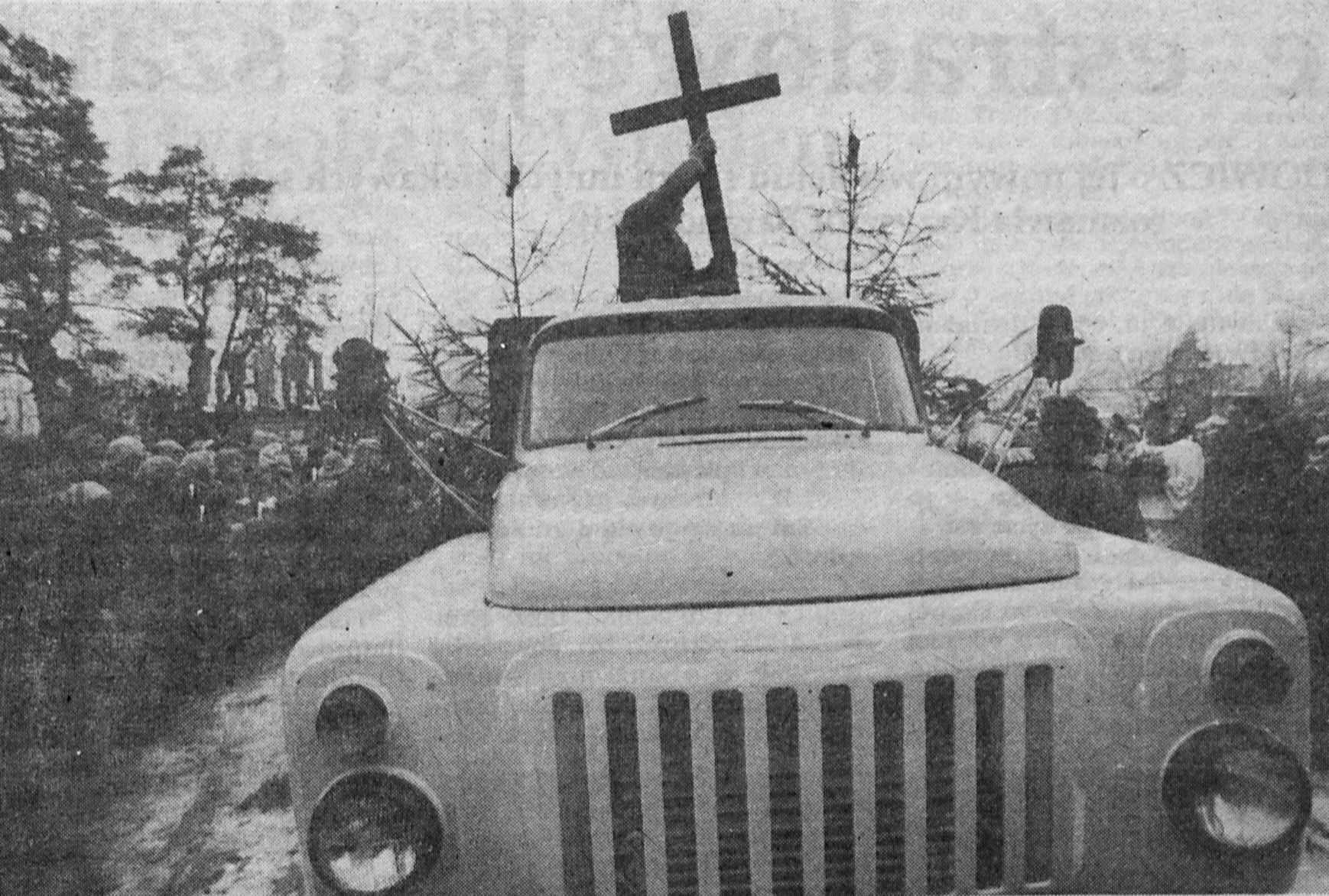
Roberts Mūrnieks' funeral

== Award ==
In 2010, Roberts Mūrnieks was awarded the Order of Viesturs for outstanding merit in defending Latvia's independence and was recognised as Commander of the Order of Viesturs.
