= Zubr =

Zubr may refer to:

- Żubr or Zubr, the name in several Slavic languages for the wisent or European bison (Bison bonasus)
- Zubr (political organization), a civic youth organization in Belarus
- Zubr, a novel by Daniil Granin
- TOZ-55 "Zubr", a Soviet hunting rifle
- Zubr-class LCAC, a Russian hovercraft
- Żubr (beer), a Polish brand of beer
- Zubr (Czech beer), a Czech brewery and brand of beer
  - HC Zubr Přerov, an ice hockey club sponsored by the brewery
- Zubr, a village near Daugavpils in modern Latvia
- LWS-6 Żubr, a Polish aircraft
- AMZ Żubr, a Polish armored car
- Zubr (special police force), the riot police of Moscow
