= Barricades Defenders Remembrance Day =

Latvian national remembrance day

Barricades Defenders’ Remembrance Day (Latvian: 1991. gada barikāžu aizstāvju atceres diena) is a Latvian national remembrance day observed annually on 20 January to commemorate the civilians who defended key state institutions during the January 1991 Barricades in Riga. Following Latvia’s 1990 declaration of independence, rising pressure from Soviet authorities led tens of thousands of volunteers to construct barricades around parliament, broadcasting centers, and other strategic sites as a form of non‑violent resistance. On 20 January 1991, Soviet OMON forces carried out coordinated attacks that resulted in five deaths and multiple injuries. The remembrance day was formally established by law in 1997.

== Background ==
The January 1991 Barricades were a mass civic resistance movement organized in response to Soviet attempts to overturn Latvia’s declaration of independence. Citizens built improvised barricades around the Supreme Council, the Interior Ministry, and the national broadcasting center. The events are widely regarded as a defining moment in Latvia’s modern history and national identity.

== Events of January 1991 ==
Between 13 and 27 January 1991, Soviet OMON units carried out several attacks in Riga. On 20 January, gunfire near the Interior Ministry resulted in the deaths of five people and injuries to several others. Despite the violence, the barricades remained in place, and the Popular Front of Latvia continued to coordinate civilian defense efforts.

== Commemoration and Memory ==
Barricades Defenders’ Remembrance Day is observed each year with official ceremonies, public gatherings, and educational events. State officials, former participants, and members of the public lay flowers and light candles at memorial sites in Riga. Schools and cultural institutions organize exhibitions, discussions, and lessons dedicated to the barricades.

The Museum of the 1991 Barricades, founded in 2001, preserves artifacts, documents, and testimonies from the events. Anniversary years often include special cultural programs. In 2026, Riga Municipality organized the concert‑performance “Ar dziļuma spēku” at Riga Cathedral.

== See also ==
- Day of the Restoration of Latvian Independence
- On the Restoration of Independence of the Republic of Latvia
- Baltic Way
- January Events
- Phosphorite War
- Singing Revolution
