= Zvaigznes =

In ancient Latvian culture, Zvaigznes ("stars") referred to several different ideas.

1. short for Zvaigznes Diena, a holiday.
2. Zelta Zvaigzne ("golden star") was an alternate name for Auseklis
3. Ausekla Zvaigzne ("star of Auseklis") was symbol of Venus and the Latvian freedom movement.
