= Romualds Ražuks =

Latvian doctor and politician

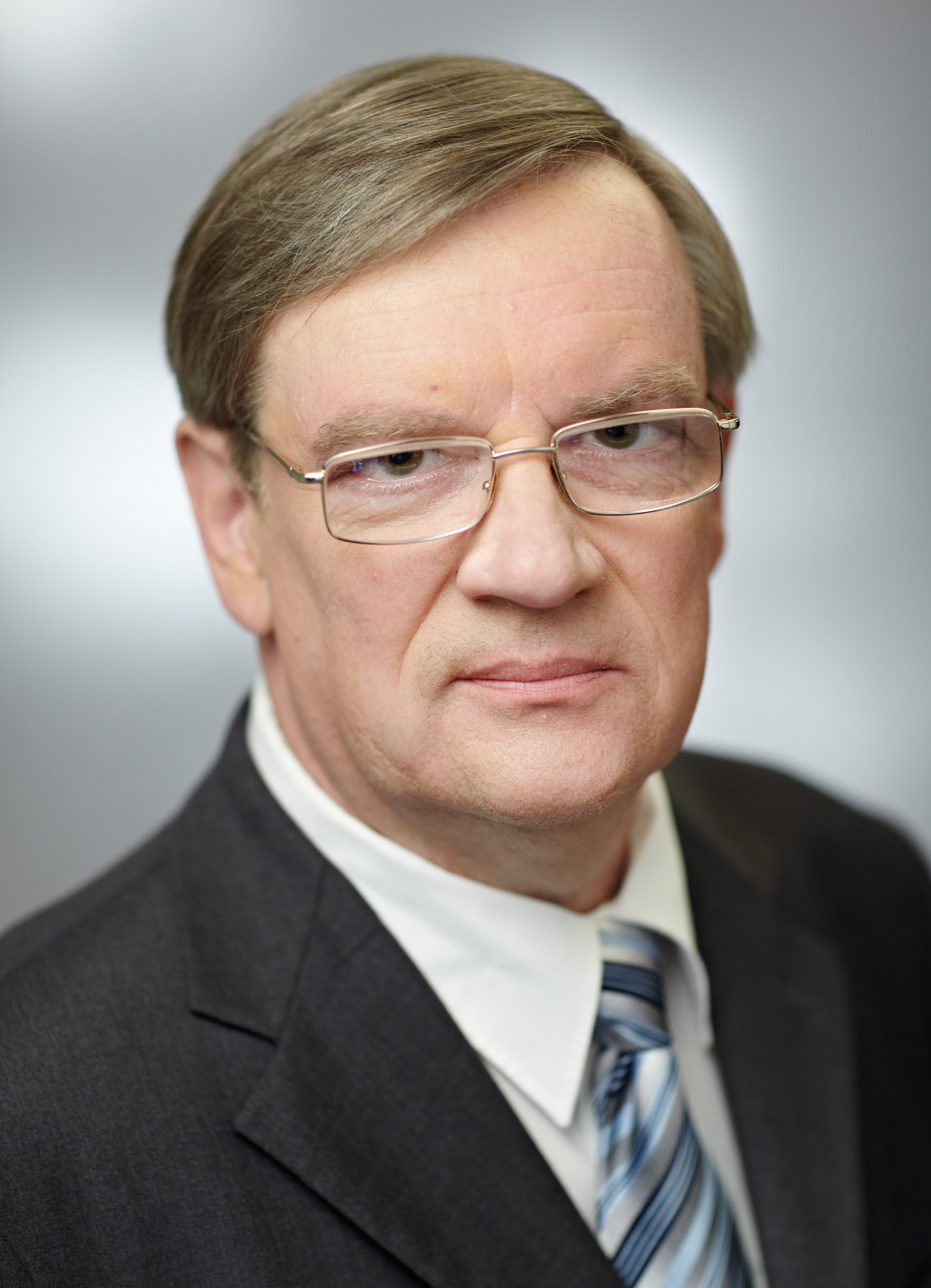
Romualds Razuks in 2011

Romualds Ražuks (Lithuanian: Romualdas Ražukas; born 19 November 1955) is a Lithuania-born Latvian doctor and politician. He was the second chairman of the Popular Front of Latvia, thereafter a member of parliament of the Saeima of the Republic of Latvia and mayor of Jūrmala. Between 2014 and 2018, he was a member of parliament of the 12th Saeima, representing the political party Unity.

== Early life ==
Ražuks was born in Vilnius, Lithuania. He studied at the Medical Faculty of the Vilnius University. In 1985, he defended his PhD thesis in medicine in Moscow. In 1986, he moved to Latvia, where he began working at the Riga Medical Institute. In 1987, he participated in the establishment of the Lithuanian Culture Society in Latvia, and became involved with the Popular Front of Latvia (PFL) a year thereafter.

== Political career ==
In October 1989, Ražuks was elected to the council of the PFL, which later elected him on to its board. At the PFL third congress, Romualds Ražuks was elected PFL chairperson, replacing Dainis Īvāns in 1990. He retained this position until 1993, when he became vice chairman of the PFL.

In 1995, Ražuks was awarded Latvian citizenship for special merit by decision of the Saeima.

In 1997, Ražuks joined the Latvian Way party, and on 3 March 1997 was elected to the Riga City Council, where he became the faction leader and worked for a year and a half. In 1998, he was elected to the parliament (7th Saeima) from the same party. In 2001 he was elected vice chairman of the Saeima, replacing Gundars Bojārs. After completing his term in the Saeima, Ražuks worked in the Ministry of Defence of the Republic of Latvia and as a NATO representative in the Southern Caucasus region. He ran for the 8th Saeima in 2002, unsuccessfully, and for the European Parliament in 2004.

In April 2008, Ražuks participated in the founding congress of the Civic Union. In the 2009 municipal elections, he was elected to the Jūrmala City Council from the same party, initially being part of the opposition. On 20 May 2010, Ražuks was elected chairman of the city council, replacing Raimonds Munkevics. However, already on 9 September 2010, he was replaced by Gatis Truksnis. In July 2011, he announced his exit from the Civic Union and his intention to join the Reform Party. Ražuks was elected from its list to the 11th Saeima during a snap election. In May 2014, Ražuks became a member of Unity, and was elected into the 12th Saeima that same year.

Razuks is a recipient of the Order of the Three Stars 4th class, the Commemorative Medal for Participants of the Barricades of 1991, as well as the Order of the Lithuanian Grand Duke Gediminas, 5th class.
