= July 2000 Chechnya suicide bombings =

Series of suicide bombings in Chechnya

- The location of Chechnya
- Location: Chechnya, North Caucasian Federal District, Russia
- Date: 2–3 July 2000
- Attack type: Suicide bombings
- Deaths: 54 (48 soldiers, 6 bombers)
- Injuries: 100+
- Perpetrator: Chechen rebels

The July 2000 Chechnya suicide bombings happened on July 2-July 3, 2000, when Chechen insurgents launched five suicide bomb attacks on the Russian military and police headquarters and barracks within 24 hours. Russian officials claimed that six bombers killed at least 48 Russian troops, six suicide bombers and wounded more than 100 people.

In the deadliest of the attacks, at least 26 people were killed and 81 wounded at OMON dormitory in Argun.

The Russian Interior Ministry for Chechnya based in Gudermes was targeted twice killing at least six troops. Following one of the bombings, a firefight broke out between Chechen guerillas and soldiers, killing three more soldiers.
