= 2002 Grozny OMON ambush =

2002 ambush attack in Russia

Coordinates: 43.4°N 45.716°E

Grozny OMON ambush
- Part of Second Chechen War
Date	April 18, 2002
Location	Grozny, Chechnya
Result	Insurgent victory

Belligerents
Russia; Chechnya; Chechen OMON	Chechen Republic of Ichkeria

Casualties and losses
21 killed, multiple wounded	Unknown

The 2002 Grozny OMON ambush occurred on April 18, 2002, when Chechen insurgents killed about 8 and wounded two republican OMON special police officers.

The ambush occurred just 90 meters from Chechnya's main police headquarters. The first bus in a convoy hit a remote controlled mine, and the militants then opened fire on the line of vehicles from the ruins of a nearby high-rise building.

Another version of the attack was presented by Nezavisimaya Gazeta, which claimed there were two connected attacks.

The incident preceded by two hours President Vladimir Putin's mid-term state-of-the-nation address, in which he said the "military phase" of the Chechen conflict had been completed.
