= Commemorative Medal for Participants of the Barricades of 1991 =

Latvian award

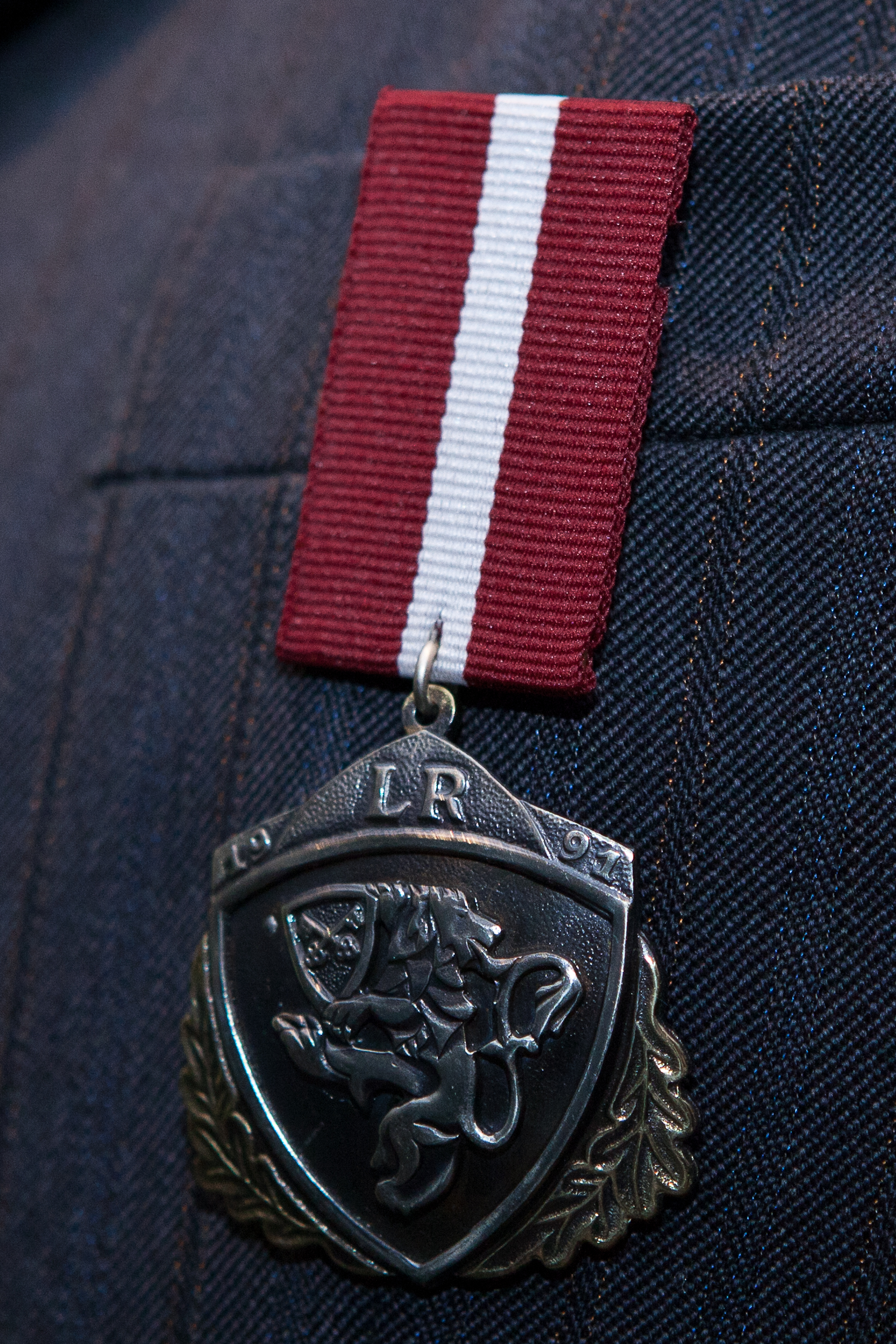
- Front side of the medal.
- Type: Campaign medal
- Established: 1991
- First award: 20 January 1996
- Final award: October 2011
- Ribbon bar of the medal

The Commemorative Medal for Participants of the Barricades of 1991 (Latvian: 1991. gada barikāžu dalībnieka piemiņas zīme) is a Latvian state award given to people who participated in or supported the actions of those who took part in the defense of Latvia against forces loyal to the Soviet Union during the confrontation in 1991 known as The Barricades.

== History ==
The purpose of the medal is to honour those who took part in the confrontations with Soviet forces during The Barricades in 1991, part of the struggle for Latvia to regain its independence and put an end to the Soviet occupation. The first medal was awarded on 20 January 1996, and the last one in October 2011. An amendment to the law regulating the award of the medal made in 2007 stipulated that no new nominations for the awarding of the medal could take place after 31 December 2008. Thus, the medal is no longer awarded as it is deemed that all those eligible for it have already received it; around 32,000 people have been awarded the medal.

== Description ==
The medal was given to those who took active part in The Barricades or supported them morally or logistically. It was given in recognition of "the courage, selflessness and initiative they demonstrated in January and August 1991, as well as for their contribution in performing organisational and logistic activities." It was awarded by a specially designated board, chaired by the Speaker of the Latvian Parliament (Saeima). It could also be awarded posthumously. The first medals were awarded posthumously to those who had died during the conflict, the very first medal was awarded to Vladimir Gomanovič who was killed on 20 January 1991 by Soviet forces.

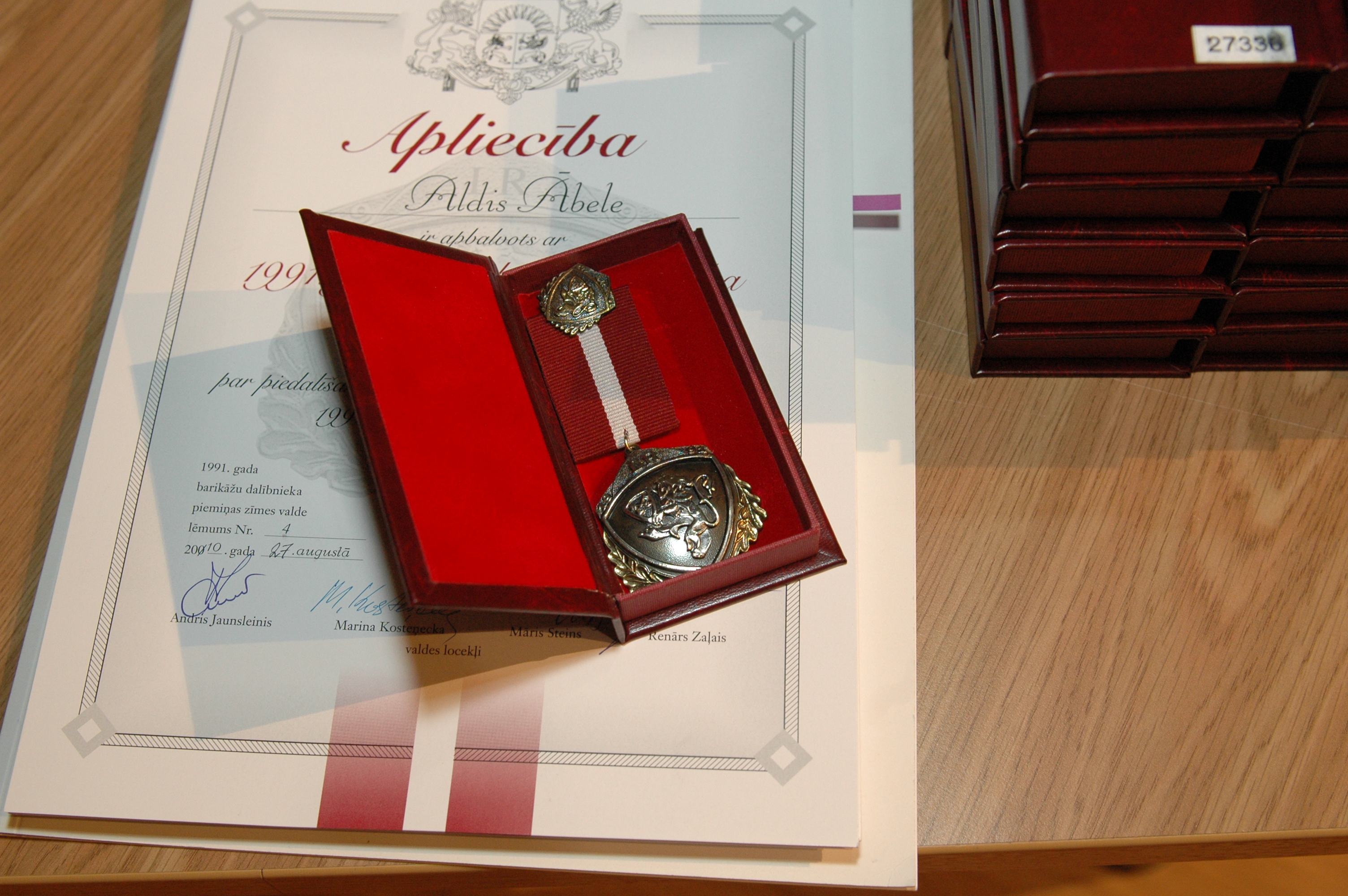
A box with the medal and pin and the award certificate

The medal is a shield-shaped medal surrounded by oak leaves, 4 centimetres (1.6 in) in diameter. On the obverse, it carries the image of a lion carrying a shield with two crossed keys, and the inscription "LR 1991". On the reverse, the serial number of the medal and the words Par Latviju ("For Latvia") are engraved. Its band is a crimson-white-crimson band (similar to the flag of Latvia), 30 millimetres (1.2 in) wide. Apart from the medal, a smaller pin with the same motif was also given to the recipient. The pin is intended for everyday use.

== See also ==
- Order of the Heavenly Hundred Heroes, given to participants in the 2013–14 Euromaidan protests in Ukraine
