= Zubr (special police force) =

Moscow police tactical and riot unit

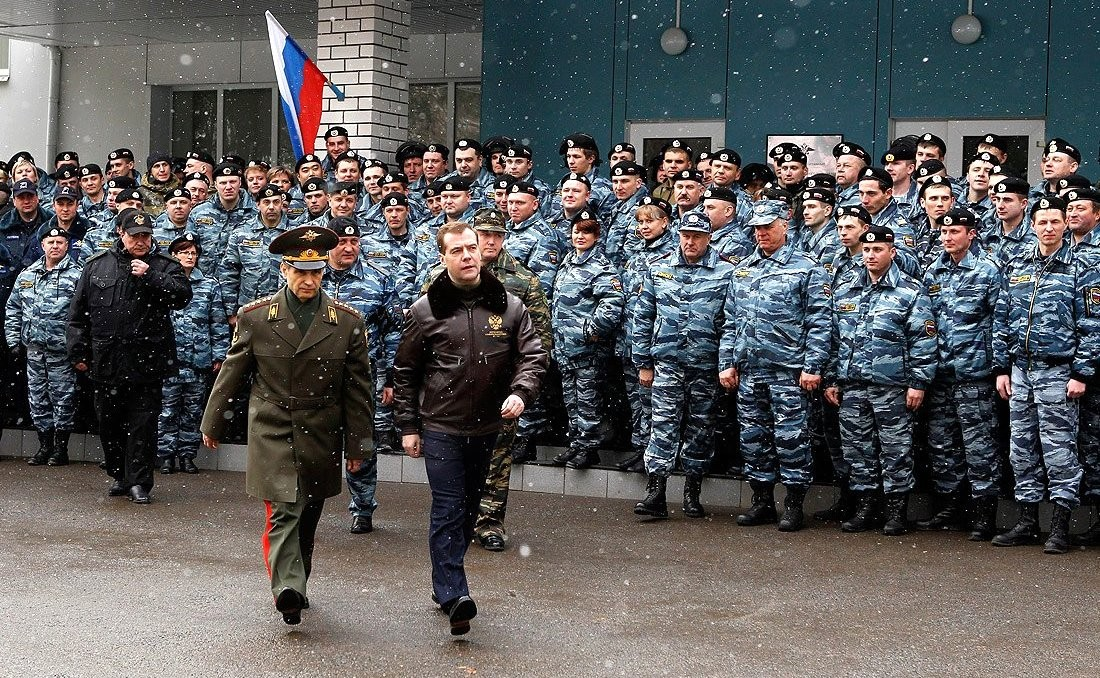
Former Russian President, Medvedev, and Interior Minister, Rashid Nurgaliyev, inspects Zubr in 2011

The Zubr Special Purpose Police Detachment (Russian: Отряд Милиции Особого Назначения "Зубр"; is Russian for Bison, particularly the European bison) of the Ministry of Internal Affairs of Russia was created in February 2006 on the basis of the OMON GUVD in the Moscow Region that existed since 1988. It reports directly to the Minister of the Interior, and is based in Shchelkovo-7 near Moscow. Zubr was made up of officers drawn from the OMON riot police near Moscow and numbered about 430 people. Zubr is equipped with armored personnel carriers, Tigrs and other special equipment, and includes snipers and dog handlers.

At the time of the creation of Zubr, some media characterized it as a special unit to combat the "Orange Revolution", citing the fact that the salaries of his rank-and-file soldiers were two times higher than in other units. Zubr provided order during the "March of Dissent" in Nizhny Novgorod, Ryazan, Moscow.

== History ==
Operation OMON “Zubr”, carried out on December 21, 2008 in Vladivostok, during which fighters of the Moscow Region unit urgently deployed by aviation dispersed a rally of motorists who made a round dance around the New Year tree. Interior Ministry officials explained that the stay of the Moscow Region unit in Vladivostok “was dictated not so much by the complexity of the situation in the city as by the tasks of training fighters”.

In 2009, an organized criminal group was identified in the Moscow Region consisting of former and current members of the Zubr riot police, who engaged in kidnappings of people to extort of large sums of money. In October 2011, the materials of the criminal case were sent to the court of Vidnoye, Moscow Region.

Five Zubr members were awarded Heroes of Russia (two posthumously), and 95 received Knights of the Order of Courage.

In January 2011, in accordance with the Decree of the President of the Russian Federation “On Additional Measures to Ensure the Law and Order,” the Zubr OMON and the Lynx Special Forces Detachment became part of the Special Purpose Center for Rapid Response and Aviation Forces of the Ministry of Internal Affairs of Russia (TsSN OR). On June 22, 2011 then-Russian President Medvedev awarded A. Ivanin, a major general of police, the title of Head of the Special Purpose Center of the Rapid Response and Aviation Forces of the Ministry of Internal Affairs of the Russian Federation. He served this post until 2012, when he was dismissed by decree of President Vladimir Putin.

In April 2013, members of the Zubr OMON were sent to Belgorod, where they took part in operational-search measures to detain the "Belgorod shooter", Sergey Pomazun.

== Duties ==
The main tasks facing the Zubr riot police are to ensure the safety of citizens, the rule of law and public safety on the streets and in other public places, as well as during mass events; prevention and suppression of crimes, participation in the fight against terrorist, sabotage and reconnaissance and landing groups.

== Gallery ==
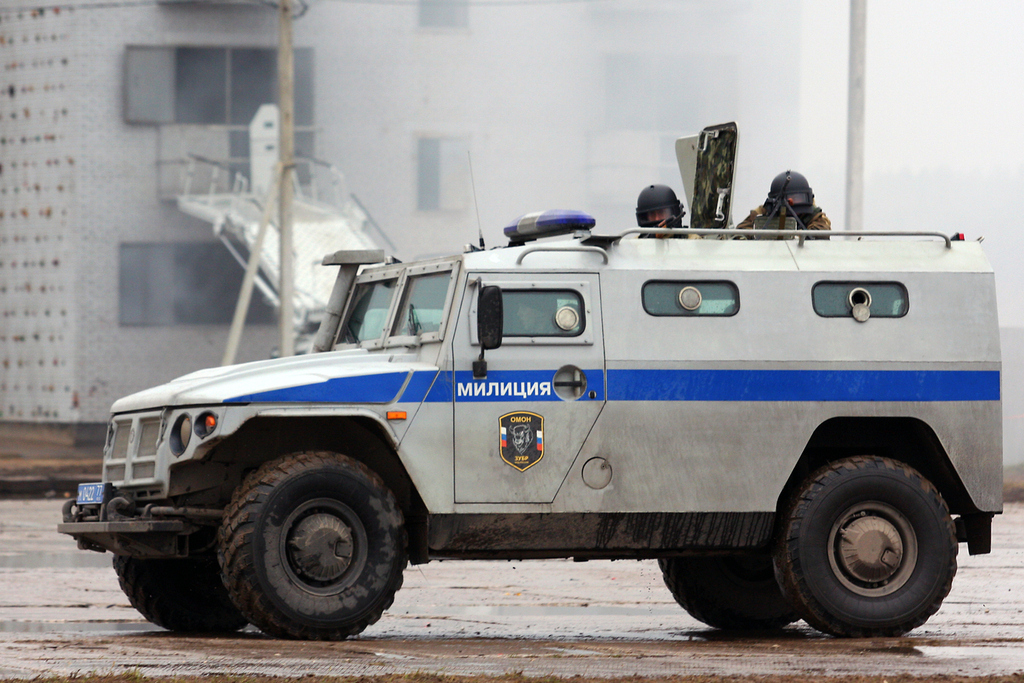
GAZ-233036 GAZ Tiger SPM-2 OMON "Zubr"

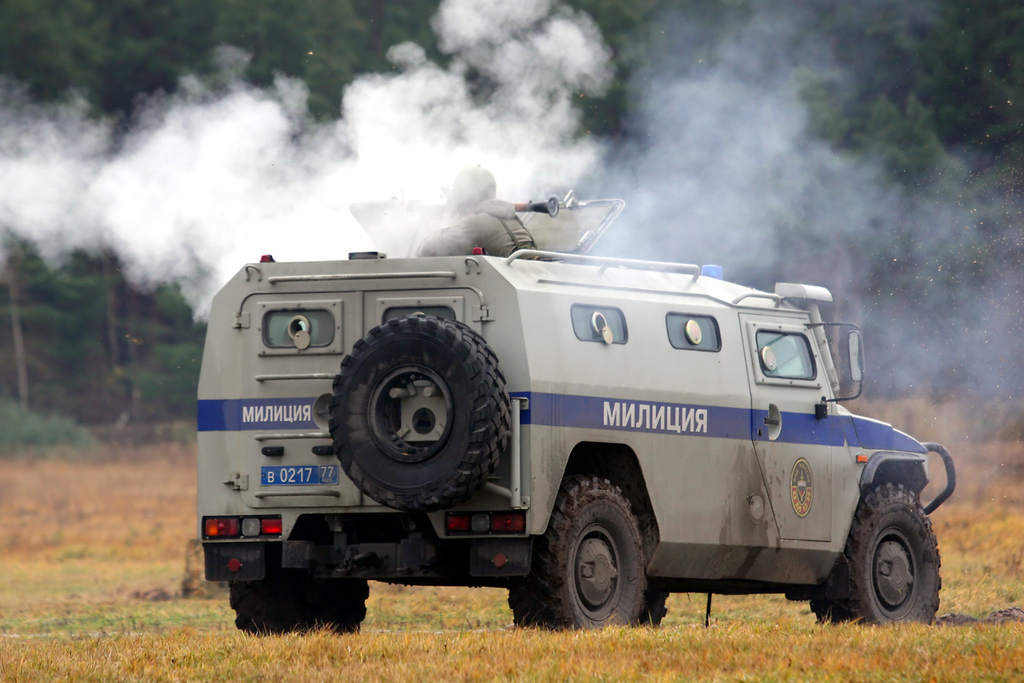
GAZ-233036 SPM-2 OMON "Zubr"

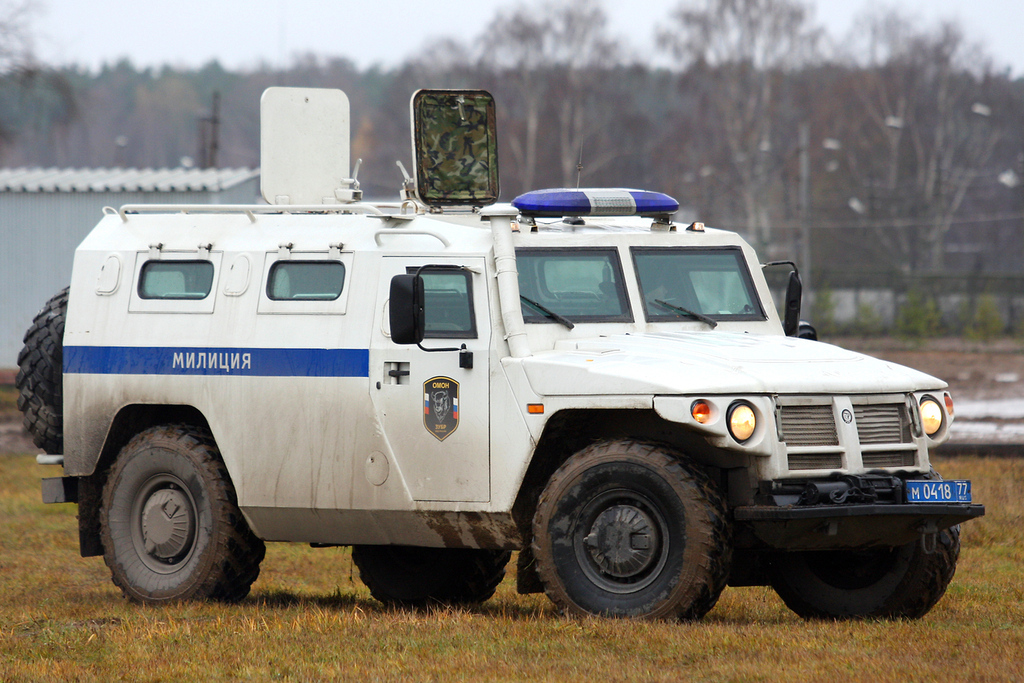
GAZ-233036 SPM-2 OMON "Zubr"

== See also ==
- OMON
- Unofficial OMON webpage
- The Kingdom of OMON, The eXile, 18 May 2007
