= OMON =

Russian special police units

Special Purpose Mobile Unit
- Отряд мобильный особого назначения
- Patch of OMON
- Active: 5 May 1919; 107 years ago (Russia) 3 October 1988; 38 years ago (Soviet Union)
- Country: Soviet Union (originally); Russia
- Agency: National Guard of Russia
- Type: Gendarmerie; Riot police
- Common name: Omonovtsy, "Black Berets"
- Abbreviation: OMOH/ОMON

Structure
- Officers: Estimated 20,000 (in Russia)

Notables
- Significant operation(s): January 1991 events in Lithuania; January 1991 events in Latvia; Lithuanian border attacks; First Nagorno-Karabakh War; Georgian Civil War; Tajikistan Civil War; East Prigorodny Conflict; 1993 Russian constitutional crisis; First Chechen War; Second Chechen War
- Anniversaries: 3 October (OMON Day/День ОМОН)

OMON (Note: Russian: ОМОН – отряд мобильный особого назначения, romanized: OMON - otryad mobilnyy osobogo naznacheniya, lit. 'Special-Purpose Mobile Unit (SPMU)', pronounced [ɐˈmon | ɐˈtrʲat mɐˈbʲilʲnɨj ɐˈsobəvə nəznɐˈt͡ɕenɪjə], before 2011 Russian: отряд милиции особого назначения, romanized: otryad militsii osobogo naznacheniya, lit. 'Special-Purpose Police Unit') is a system of special police units within the National Guard of Russia. It previously operated within the structures of the Soviet and Russian Ministry of Internal Affairs (MVD). Originating as the special forces unit of the Soviet militsiya in 1988, it has played major roles in several armed conflicts during and following the 1991 dissolution of the Soviet Union.

OMON is much larger and better known than SOBR, another special-police branch of the National Guard of Russia. In modern contexts, OMON serves as a riot police group, or as a gendarmerie-like paramilitary force. OMON units also exist in Belarus, Kazakhstan, Tajikistan, and other post-Soviet states. However, some post-Soviet units have changed names and acronyms. Russian speakers commonly refer to OMON officers as omonovtsy (Russian: омоновцы; singular: omonovyets – Russian: омоновец).

On 5 April 2016, OMON became part of the newly-established National Guard of Russia, ending its years as part of the MVD. The MVD continues to operate the Police of Russia.

== History ==
Special purpose militia units were formed on May 5, 1919 in the Russian state in the structure of the "white" (Siberian) militia. Alexander Kolchak emphasized that

OMON is a combat unit for the protection and restoration of state order and public peace, serves as a reserve for the formation of militia in areas liberated from Soviet power to train experienced police officers

These militia units operated where open war gave way to partisan war. The detachment consisted of four foot and one horse platoons. The staff included 285 people. In those days, there was no such thing as a "omonovets" therefore these units were called "guards".

The modern Soviet OMON originated in 1979, when the first Soviet police tactical unit was founded in preparation for the 1980 Summer Olympics in Moscow to ensure that there were no terrorist incidents like the Munich massacre during the 1972 Summer Olympics. Subsequently, the unit was to be utilized in emergencies such as high-risk arrests, hostage crises and acts of terror.

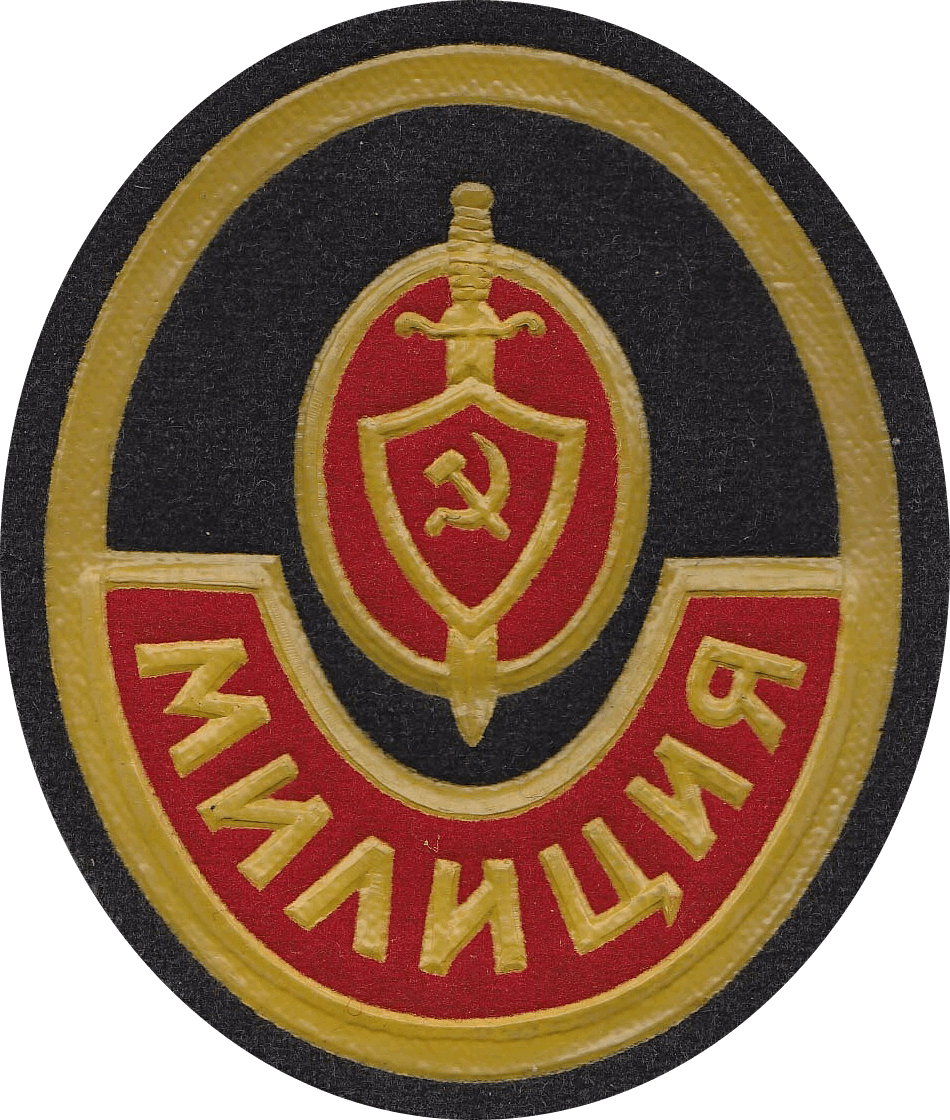
Former USSR OMON patch

Dmitry Medvedev inspecting Shchyolkovo OMON in 2011

The current OMON system is the successor of that group and was founded on 3 October 1988 in Moscow and was called the Militsiya Squad of Special Assignment. Special police detachments were often composed of former soldiers of the Soviet Army and veterans of the Soviet–Afghan War. OMON units were used as riot police to control and stop demonstrations and hooliganism, as well as to respond to emergency situations involving violent crime. The units later took on a wider range of police duties, including cordon and street patrol actions, and even paramilitary and military-style operations.

Following Russia's 2011 police reform, Russian OMON units were to be renamed Distinctive Purpose Teams (KON), while OMSN (SOBR) would become Special Purpose Teams (KSN). It was announced that Special Purpose Centers for Rapid Deployment forces would also be created in Russian regions, to include regional OMON and OMSN units. In essence, all police spetsnaz (special designation) units were brought together under the joint command of the Interior Ministry — the Center for Operational Spetsnaz and Aviation Forces of MVD (Центр специального назначения сил оперативного реагирования и авиации МВД России).

In January 2012, Russia's OMON was renamed from otryad militsii osobogo naznacheniya, (Special Purpose Militia Unit) to otryad mobilniy osobogo naznacheniya (Special Purpose Mobile Unit), keeping the acronym.

=== Soviet OMON activities ===
On 20 January 1991, Soviet-loyalist Riga OMON attacked Latvia's Interior Ministry, killing six people during the January 1991 events, in a failed pro-Moscow coup attempt following the Latvian SSR's declaration of independence, which was not confirmed by an internal investigation. Seven OMON officers were subsequently found guilty by the Riga District Court and were sentenced in absentia. Part of the Riga OMON troops remained loyal to the USSR and their oath of allegiance. The unit was evacuated from Riga to Tyumen in Russia by air force together with all ammunition, vehicles and firearms, and incorporated with local Tyumen OMON.

A series of attacks on border outposts of the newly independent Republic of Lithuania took place during the period of January to July 1991. These resulted in several summary execution-style deaths of unarmed customs officers and other people (including former members of Vilnius OMON), which were attributed to Riga OMON. Some sources say that Soviet leader Mikhail Gorbachev had lost control of the unit during that period. For years, Lithuania continued to demand that the persons suspected in these incidents be tried in Lithuania; one suspect was arrested in Latvia in November 2008.

The April–May 1991 Operation Ring by the Azerbaijan SSR OMON and the Soviet Army against the Armenian irregular units in the Nagorno-Karabakh Autonomous Oblast resulted in forty deaths of mostly Armenian civilians, and the forced displacement of nearly 10,000 ethnic Armenians. In later attacks, several more Armenian civilians were killed; others suffered abuse which included instances of rape. In continuing fighting in this area, fourteen Azerbaijani OMON members and one Armenian paramilitary fighter were reported killed in September 1991.

Violent and often armed clashes also occurred between the Georgian SSR's OMON and opponents of the first Georgian President Zviad Gamsakhurdia prior to the Georgian Civil War of 1991–1993. Eleven combatants on both sides, including Georgian OMON members and regular militsiya officers, were reported killed in skirmishes during September and October 1991. There were also allegations of OMON firing at unarmed protesters.

=== Post-Soviet OMON activities ===
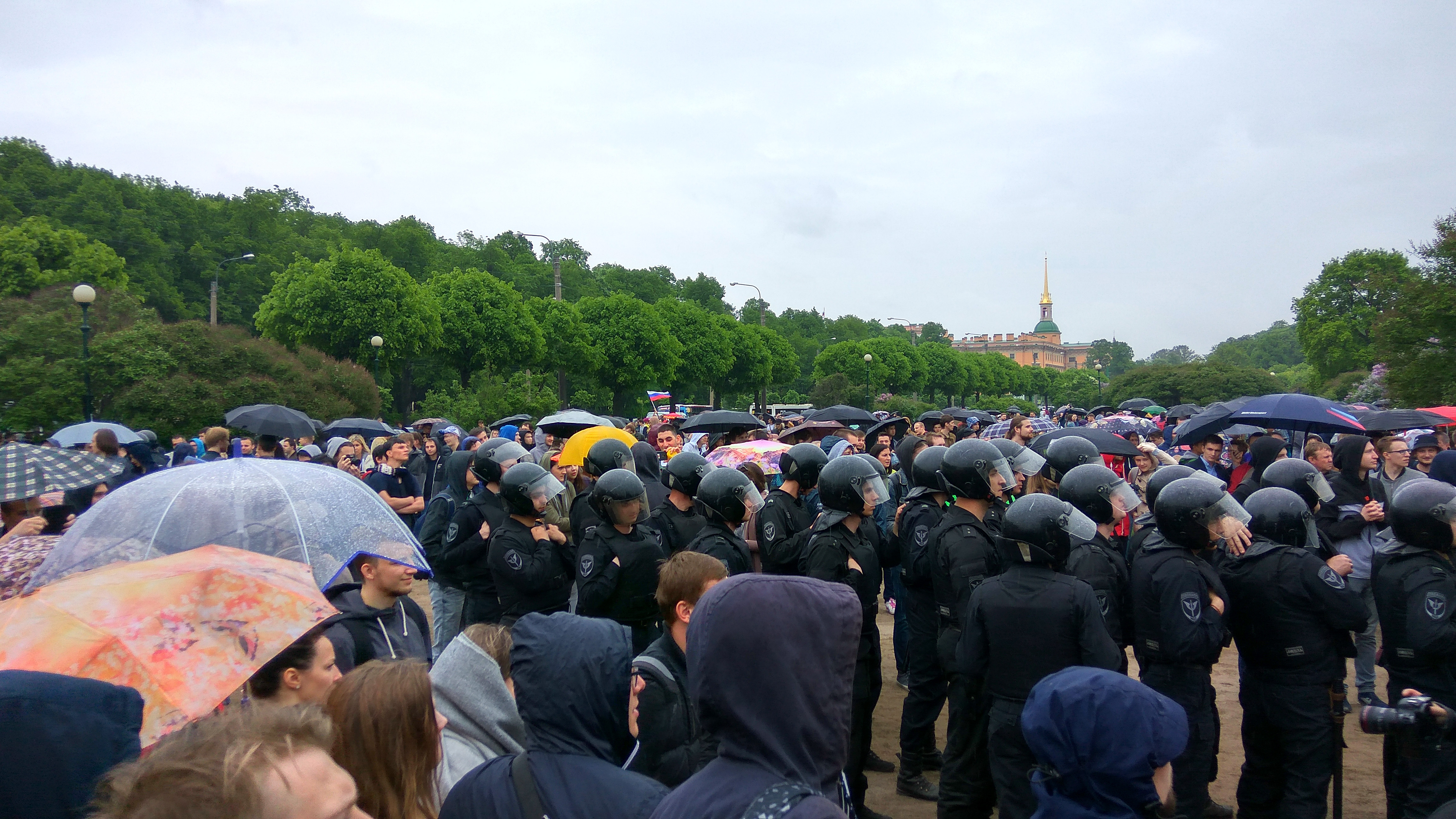
Saint Petersburg, Field of Mars, 12 June 2017, OMON during the rally

Prior to the creation of the Armed Forces of the Republic of Azerbaijan, the bulk of the fighting in Nagorno-Karabakh, on the Azeri side, was conducted by the post-Soviet OMON units and irregular forces. This included the defence of the village of Khojaly by a group of Azeri OMON troops and armed volunteers against the Armenian and Russian Army forces prior to, and during, the Khojaly massacre on 25 February 1992; most of the group involved died along with several hundred other Azeris, mostly civilians.

South Ossetian ad hoc OMON, organized by a group of Tskhinvali internal affairs division militsiya officers, was reportedly the most combat-ready force on the separatist side at the outset of the South Ossetia War in April 1992.

In Tajikistan, the civil war began after local OMON began defecting to anti-Nabiyev protesters in May 1992. The country's minority Pamiri people largely backed the United Tajik Opposition, and for that reason were targeted for massacres by pro-government forces during the bloody first phase of the war in 1992–1993. A significant portion of the Tajikistan MVD's command structure and its OMON consisted mainly of Pamiris who were then either killed or forced to flee to Gorno-Badakhshan.

North Ossetia's OMON participated in the short but vicious 1992 East Prigorodny Conflict in Russia. They killed or 'disappeared' hundreds of local indigenous Ingush people. Ossetian OMON reportedly massacred residents of Ingush villages that had first been shelled by Russian federal army tanks that were officially in to the region for 'peacekeeping' purposes.

Following the War of Transnistria in 1992, several high-ranking former OMON and KGB officers assumed senior posts in Moldova's pro-Russian separatist region of Transnistria. Former Riga OMON Major Vladimir Antyufeyev, who had led the attacks against Latvian authorities in 1991 and was put on the Interpol wanted list, renamed himself "General Vadim Shevtsov" and became Transnistria's minister of state security and intelligence. He is also alleged to have overseen the self-declared republic's organized criminal smuggling rackets. In 2012, the KGB of Transnistria announced it has "launched a criminal investigation into Vladimir Antyufeev who is suspected of misuse of state powers."

Moscow OMON, and units brought from other cities, clashed with anti-Yeltsin demonstrators during the 1993 Russian constitutional crisis and reportedly beat some members of the Supreme Soviet of Russia (Russian parliament at the time).

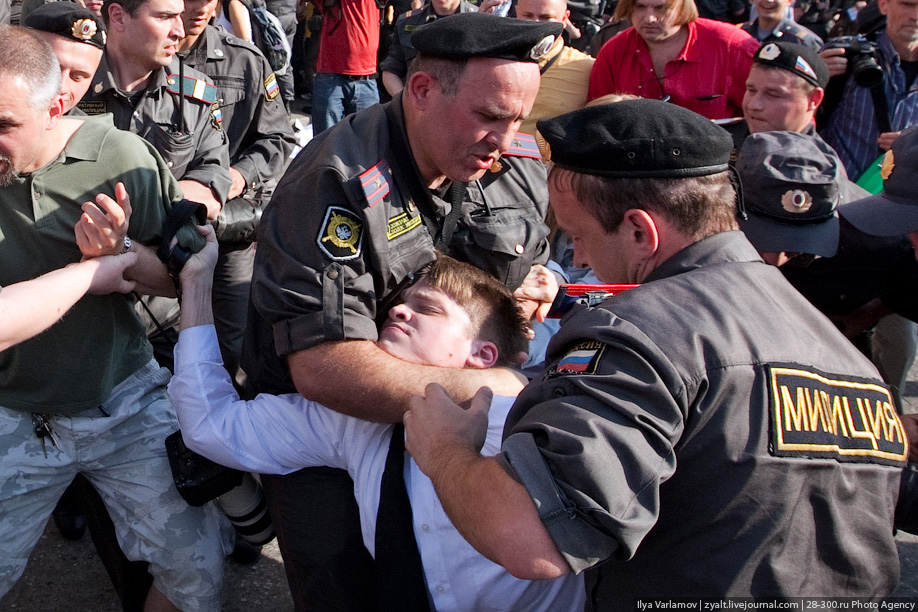
OMON cracking down on a protest action in defense of Article 31 (freedom of assembly) of the Russian Constitution in Moscow in 2010

OMON have broken up several opposition rallies, including the Dissenters' Marches since 2006, sparking reports of police brutality, including excessive use of force and arbitrary detention of participants. In 2007, the brutal actions of OMON against peaceful protesters and arrests of opposition figures were harshly criticised by the European Union institutions and governments. Moscow OMON also made international news when it prevented gay rights activists (including the European Parliament members) from marching after the Mayor of Moscow Yury Luzhkov did not allow a planned parade to take place in 2007.

On 24 March 2006, Belarusian OMON stormed the opposition's tent camp at Minsk's October Square without provocation, violently ending the peaceful Jeans Revolution against the regime of Alexander Lukashenko. Thousands of people were beaten and hundreds detained, including the opposition's presidential candidate Alaksandr Kazulin, as a result of the attack.

In February 2008, Tajik OMON commander Oleg Zakharchenko was killed in a shootout with an anti-organized crime police unit composed of former opposition fighters, under disputed circumstances, in Gharm. In 2009, the former Interior Minister of Tajikistan, Mahmadnazar Salihov, allegedly committed suicide to avoid being arrested in connection with the case; Salihov's family claimed he was murdered in a political purge.

South Ossetian separatist OMON took part in the fighting against the Georgian Armed Forces in August, during the 2008 South Ossetia war and were accused of "special cruelty" against civilians in the overrun ethnic Georgian villages. Subsequently, South Ossetian OMON fighters were absorbed into Russian regular forces in the area as contract soldiers and continued to be deployed in the highly disputed Akhalgori zone.

Gulmurod Khalimov, the Russian-U.S. trained OMON chief in Tajikistan since 2012, disappeared in 2015. He had defected to the Islamic State of Iraq and the Levant (ISIL) in Syria, and threatened to attack American cities. He was declared wanted for treason by Tajik government.

=== Conflict in Chechnya ===
The force was active in the First Chechen War of 1994–1996 in which OMON was often used in various security and light infantry roles, notably for the notorious "cleansing" (zachistka) operations. Prior to the war, there was also an OMON formation belonging to the Interior Ministry (MVD) of the Chechen Republic of Ichkeria, Chechnya's separatist government. The independent Chechnya had an OMON battalion prior to the war, but it was not battle trained, and did not play any significant role as an organized force before disintegrating. During the armed conflict, almost every Russian city would be regularly sending militsiya groups, often OMON members, for tours of usually three or four months. The pro-Moscow administration of the Chechen Republic also formed its own OMON detachments. In February 1996, a group of thirty-seven Russian OMON officers from Novosibirsk surrendered to Chechen militants of Salman Raduyev and Khunkar-Pasha Israpilov during the Kizlyar-Pervomayskoye hostage crisis.

OMON took part in the Second Chechen War as well. OMON forces sustained severe losses in the conflict, including from the March 2000 ambush which killed scores of servicemen from Berezniki and Perm (including nine captured and executed), the July 2000 suicide bombing which killed at least twenty-five Russians at Argun base of OMON from Chelyabinsk, and the April 2002 mine attack which left twenty-one Chechen OMON troops dead in central Grozny. Control and discipline continued to be questionable in Chechnya, where OMON members were known to have engaged in, or fallen victim to, several deadly incidents of friendly fire and fratricide. In perhaps the bloodiest of such incidents, at least twenty-four were killed when OMON from Podolsk attacked a column of OMON from Sergiyev Posad in Grozny on 2 March 2000. Among other incidents, several Chechen OMON servicemen were abducted and executed in Grozny by Russian military servicemen in November 2000, members of Chechen OMON engaged in a shootout with the Ingush police on the border between Chechnya and Ingushetia resulting in eight fatalities in September 2006, and Ramzan Kadyrov-controlled local OMON clashed with a group of rival Chechens belonging to the Kakiyev's Spetsnaz GRU military unit in Grozny, resulting in at least five being killed in 2007.

OMON was often accused of severe human rights abuses during the course of the conflict, including abducting, torturing, raping and killing civilians. By 2000, the bulk of such crimes, as recorded by international organisations in Chechnya, appeared to have been committed either by or with the participation of OMON. Moscow region OMON took part in the April 1995 rampage in the village of Samashki, where up to 300 civilians were reportedly killed during a large-scale brutal cleansing operation by federal MVD forces. In December 1999, a group of unidentified OMON members manning a roadblock checkpoint shot dead around forty refugees fleeing the siege of Grozny. OMON from Saint Petersburg are believed to have been behind the February 2000 Novye Aldi massacre in which at least sixty civilians were robbed and then killed by Russian forces entering Grozny after the fall of the city; one officer, Sergei Babin, was to be prosecuted in relation to the case in 2005 but he vanished. In April 2006, the European Court of Human Rights found Russia guilty of the forced disappearance of Shakhid Baysayev, a Chechen man who had gone missing after being detained in a March 2000 security sweep by Russian OMON in Grozny. In 2007, Khanty–Mansi Autonomous Okrug OMON officer Sergei Lapin was sentenced for the kidnapping and torture of a Chechen man in Grozny in 2001, with the Grozny court criticising the conduct of OMON serving in Chechnya in broader terms. In an event related to the conflict in Chechnya, several OMON officers were also accused of starting the May 2007 wave of ethnic violence in Stavropol by assisting in the racially motivated murder of a local Chechen man.

=== Persecution of Jehovah's Witnesses ===
In 2021 OMON officers tortured Jehovah's Witnesses in Irkutsk in an attempt to make them inform about other members.

=== Russo-Ukrainian War ===
Some OMON units participated in the 2022 Russian invasion of Ukraine where they were intended to disperse riots and control civil unrest after Kyiv would be captured. The failure to capture Kyiv resulted in some SOBR missions becoming redundant, they also ended up engaging in military combat and some of its personnel being killed in action or captured by the Ukrainian Armed Forces.

A group of OMON officers are suing for unlawful dismissal after being sacked for refusing to fight in Ukraine. On 28 September 2022, the Prosecutor General of Ukraine and National Police of Ukraine published CCTV footage showing OMON and Rosgvardiya personnel shooting at civilians during the battle of Hostomel.

== Russia ==
In Russia, there is an OMON unit in every oblast, as well as in many major cities. Since 2016, the OMON units report directly to the National Guard Forces Command as part of its regional district commands, and they are expected to be deployed in support of the police forces of the Ministry of Internal Affairs. Information from different sources suggested that there were between 10,500 and 15,000 OMON members stationed at population centers and transportation hubs around the country during the 1990s. The number officially rose to about 20,000 nationwide by 2007; the biggest OMON unit in Russia, Moscow OMON, numbers over 2,000 members. Most OMON officers retire at the age of approximately forty-five. They were also sometimes not paid for their service. In 2001, for example, some fifty OMON members from Moscow filed a lawsuit claiming they had not been paid for one month of combat operations in Chechnya. The use of OMON members in high-risk situations, especially in Chechnya and elsewhere in the North Caucasus, often causes the group to lose members in combat.

=== Moscow Zubr ===
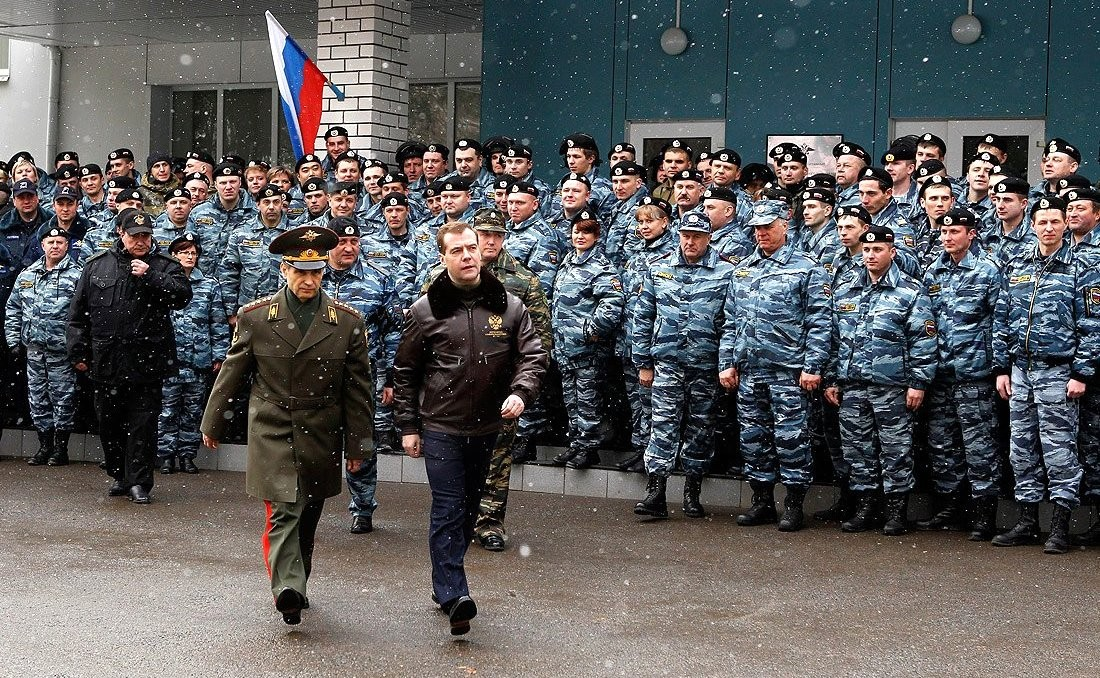
Former Russian President, Medvedev, and Interior Minister, Rashid Nurgaliyev, inspects Zubr in 2011

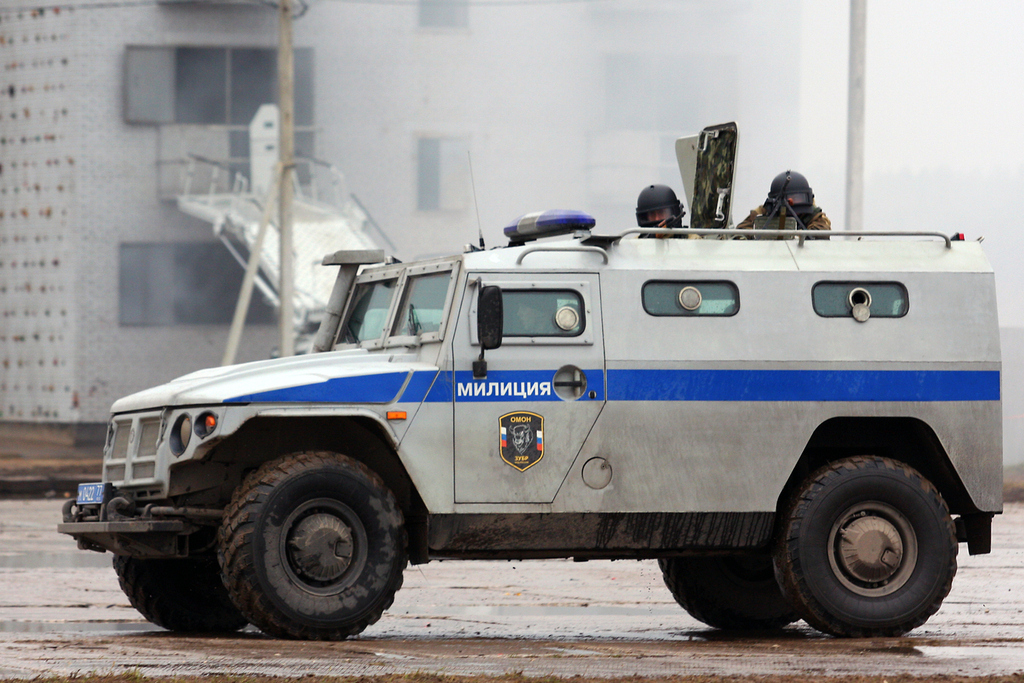
OMON Zubr GAZ Tiger SPM-2.

The Zubr Special Purpose Police Detachment (Russian: Отряд Милиции Особого Назначения "Зубр"; is Russian for Bison, particularly the European bison) of the Ministry of Internal Affairs of Russia was created in February 2006 on the basis of the OMON GUVD in the Moscow Region that existed since 1988. It is based in Shchelkovo-7 near Moscow. Zubr was made up of officers drawn from the OMON riot police near Moscow and numbered about 430 people. Zubr is equipped with armored personnel carriers, Tigrs and other special equipment, and includes snipers and dog handlers.

=== Equipment ===
OMON groups use a wide range of firearms, including AK-74 assault rifle, AKS-74U carbine assault rifle, 9A-91 compact assault rifle, and PP-19 Bizon submachine gun, and the Makarov pistol, Stechkin automatic pistol and the MP-443 Grach or GSh-18 are assigned as sidearms. OMON units may use other weaponry, typically used by Russian light infantry during special operations and in war zones, such as: the PK machine gun, the GP-25 underbarrel grenade launcher for assault rifle or the GM-94 pump-action grenade launcher, RPG series rocket-proppelled grenade launchers, and the Dragunov and Vintorez designated marksman rifles. The kind of issued protective gear is shared with regular National Guard units. The Bagariy body armor is a common sight replacing the older Kora-Kulon while the ZSH 1–2 is the main issued helmet with the older Kolpak being used only on riot duty. They are sometimes called "OMON soldiers".

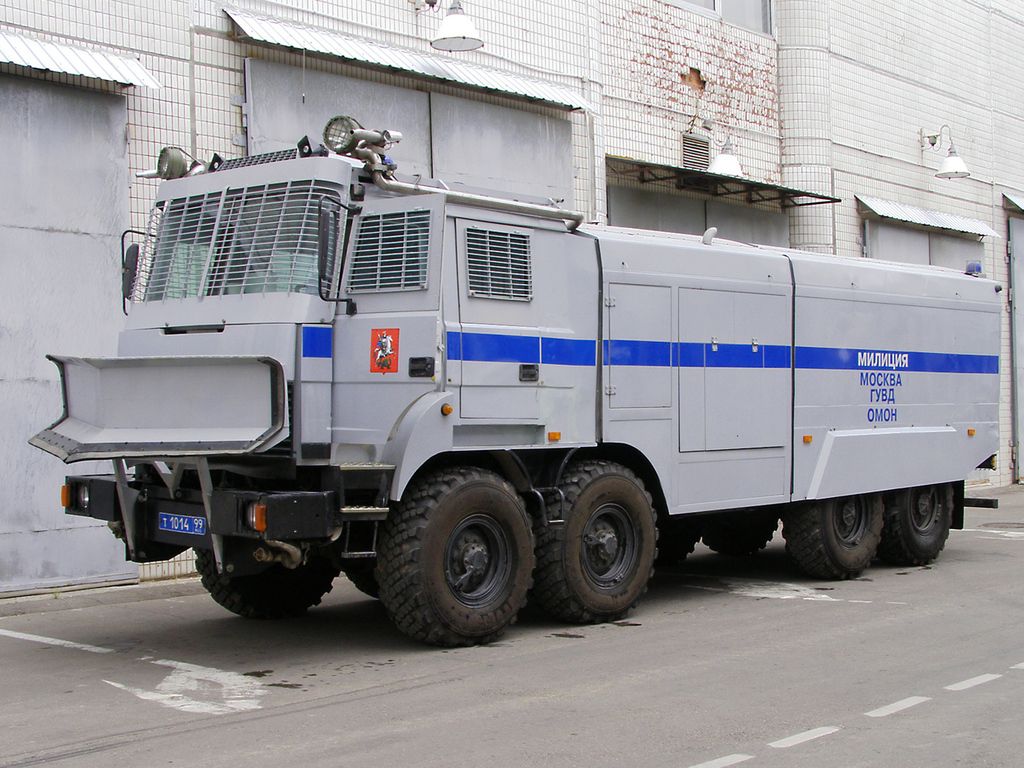
Moscow OMON "Lavina-Uragan" (Avalanche-Hurricane) riot control vehicle.

As riot police, OMON often uses special equipment termed riot gear to help protect themselves and attack others. Riot gear typically includes personal armor, batons, riot and tactical shields, and riot helmets. OMON also deploys specialized less-than-lethal weapons, such as water cannon, pepper spray, tear gas, sponge grenades, pistols, rifles, and shotguns which fire rubber bullets, bean bag rounds, stun grenades, and Long Range Acoustic Devices.

=== Transport ===
OMON vehicles include specially-equipped vans, buses and trucks of various types (often armored and sometimes equipped with mounted machine guns), as well as a limited number of armored personnel carriers such as GAZ Tigr, BTR-60, BTR-70 and BTR-80.

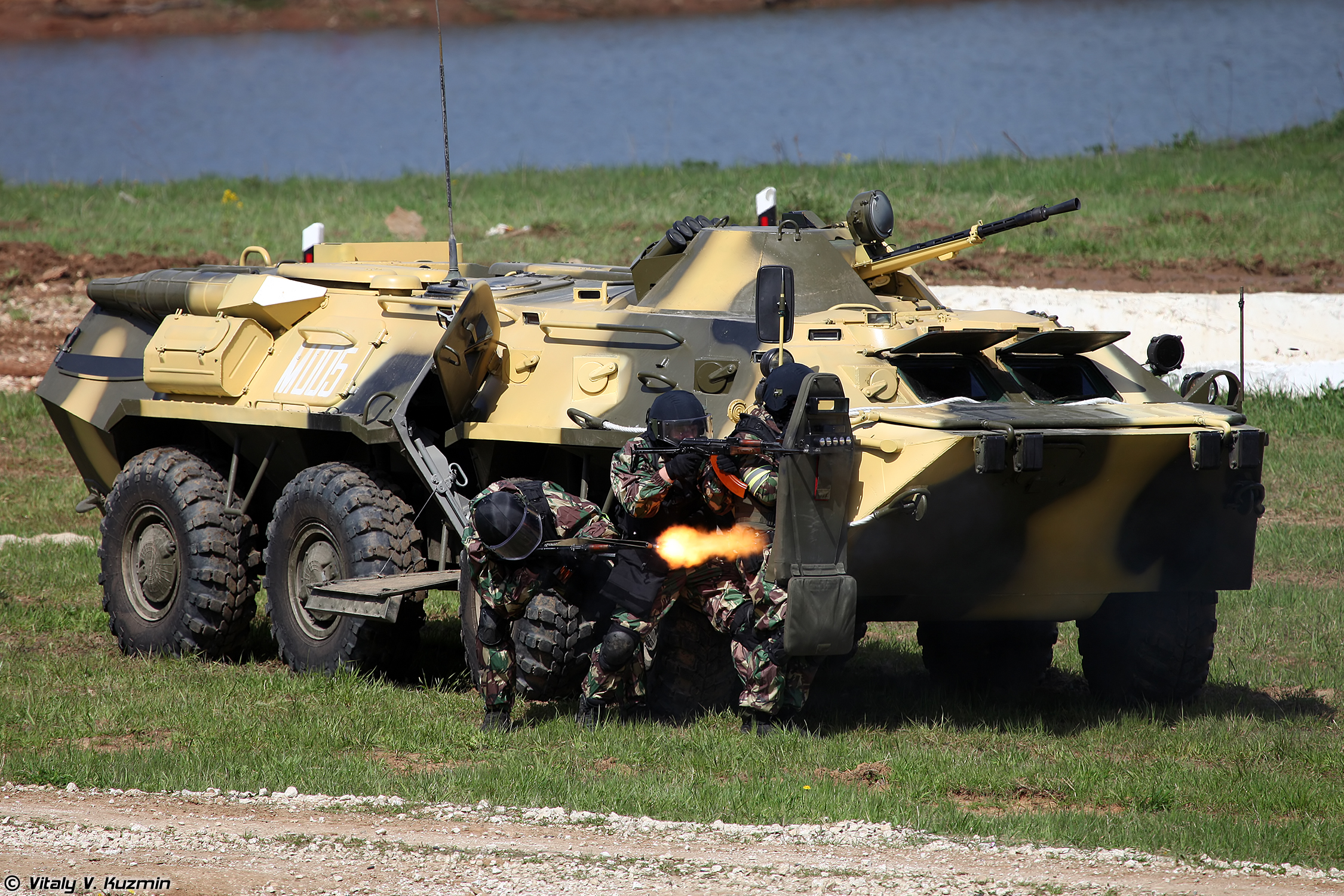
Moscow OMON with BTR-80M assault a building with suspects during Interpolitex 2017 exhibition.

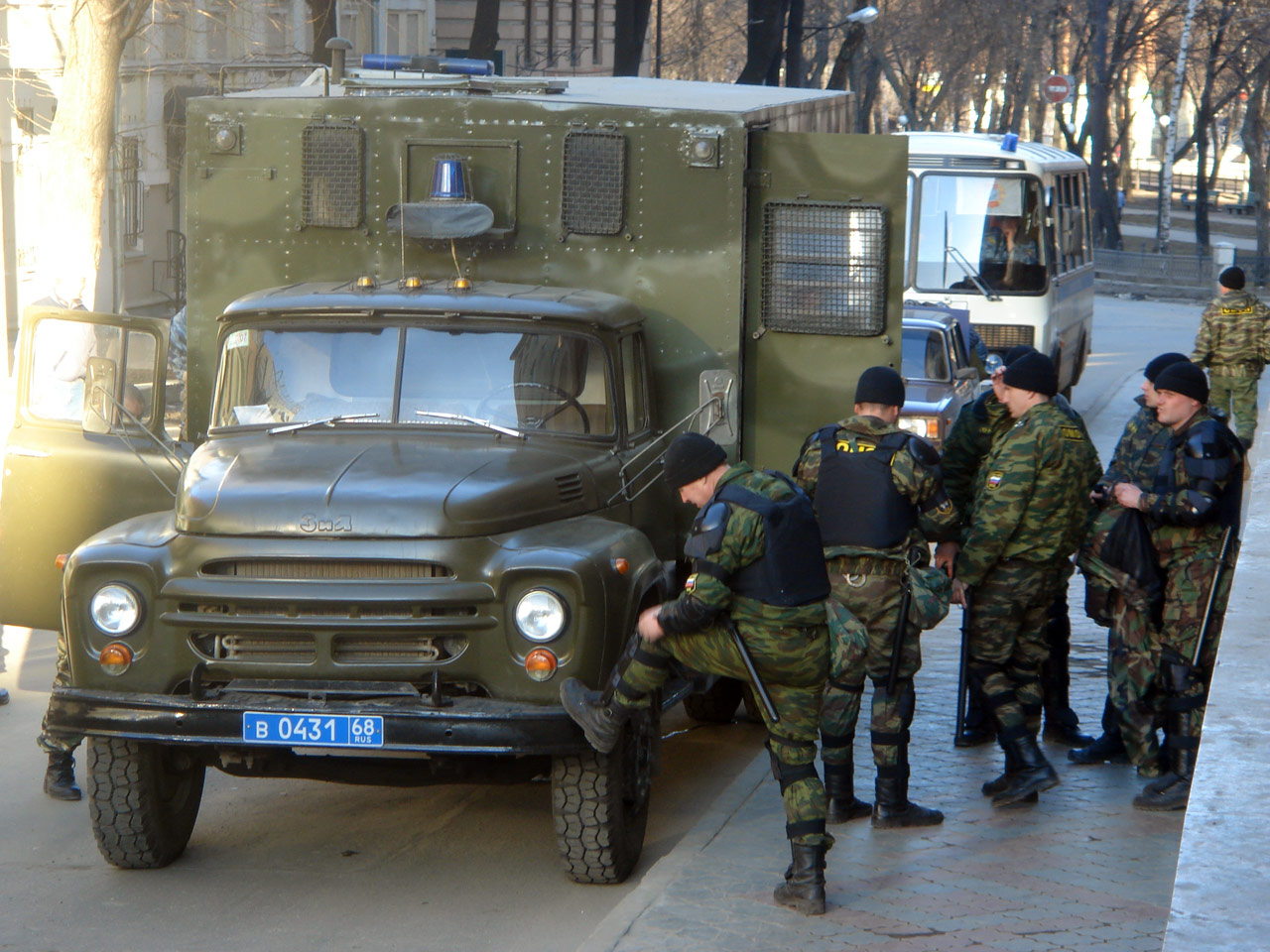
Green Kamysh wearing Tambov OMON units in Nizhny Novgorod with a "truck bus" on a ZIL-130.

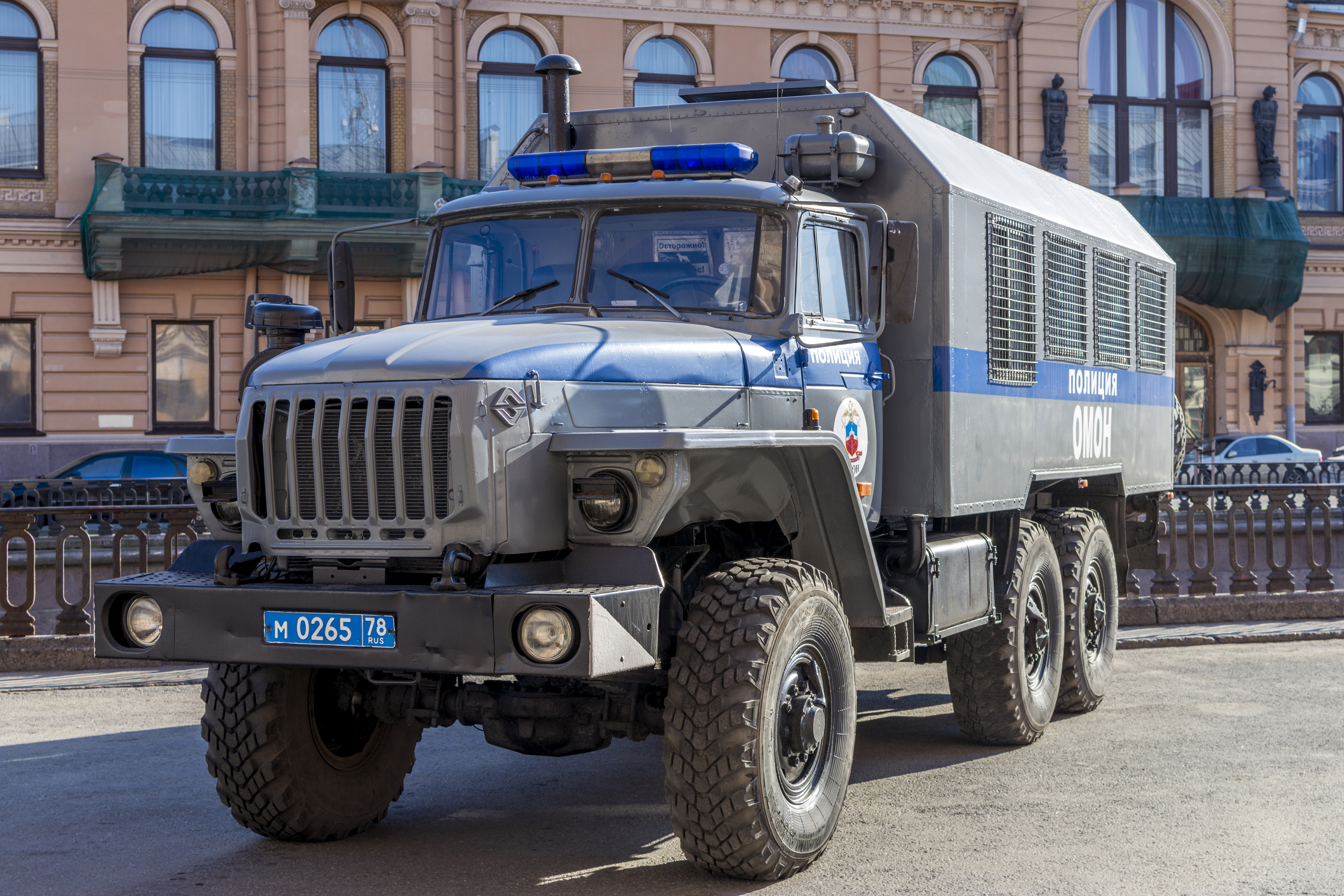
Saint Petersburg OMON Ural-4320 truckbus.

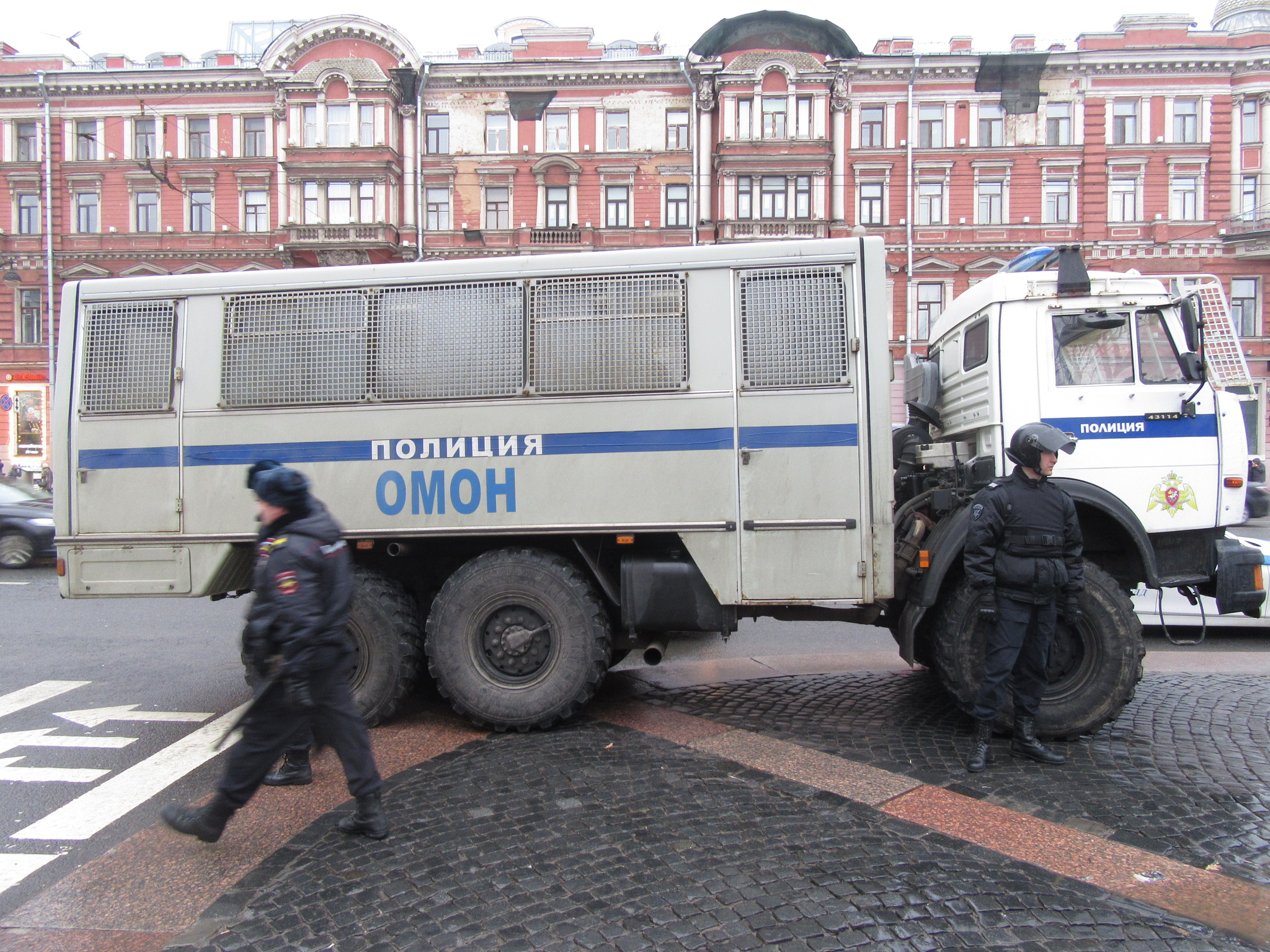
Mothers' rally. St. Petersburg, 2019-02-10.

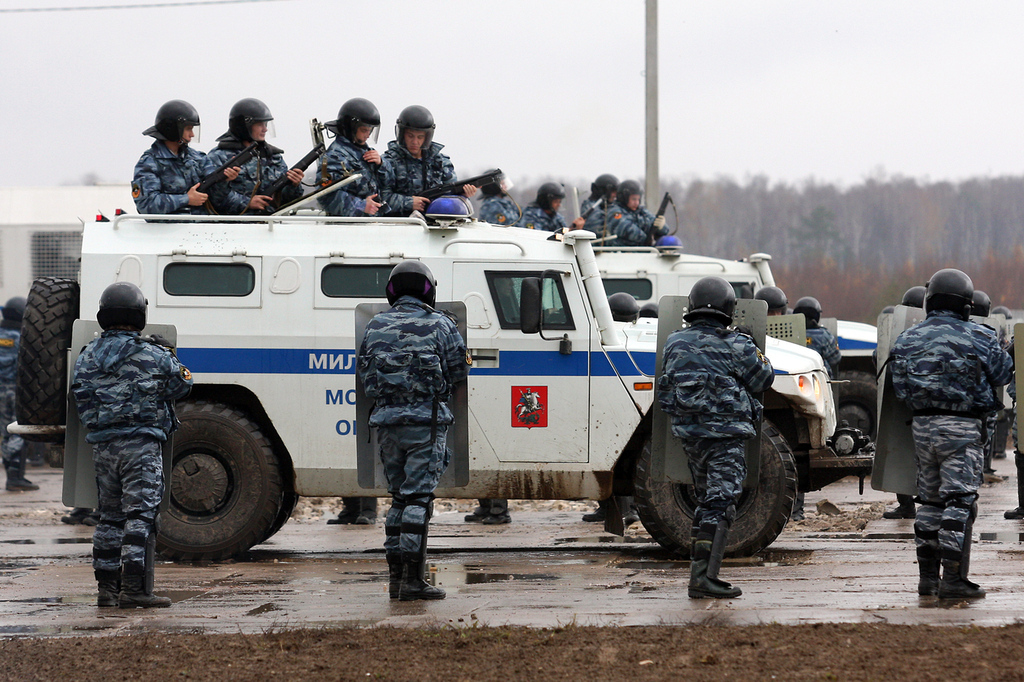
Moscow OMON SPM-1 vehicle during anti-riot training.

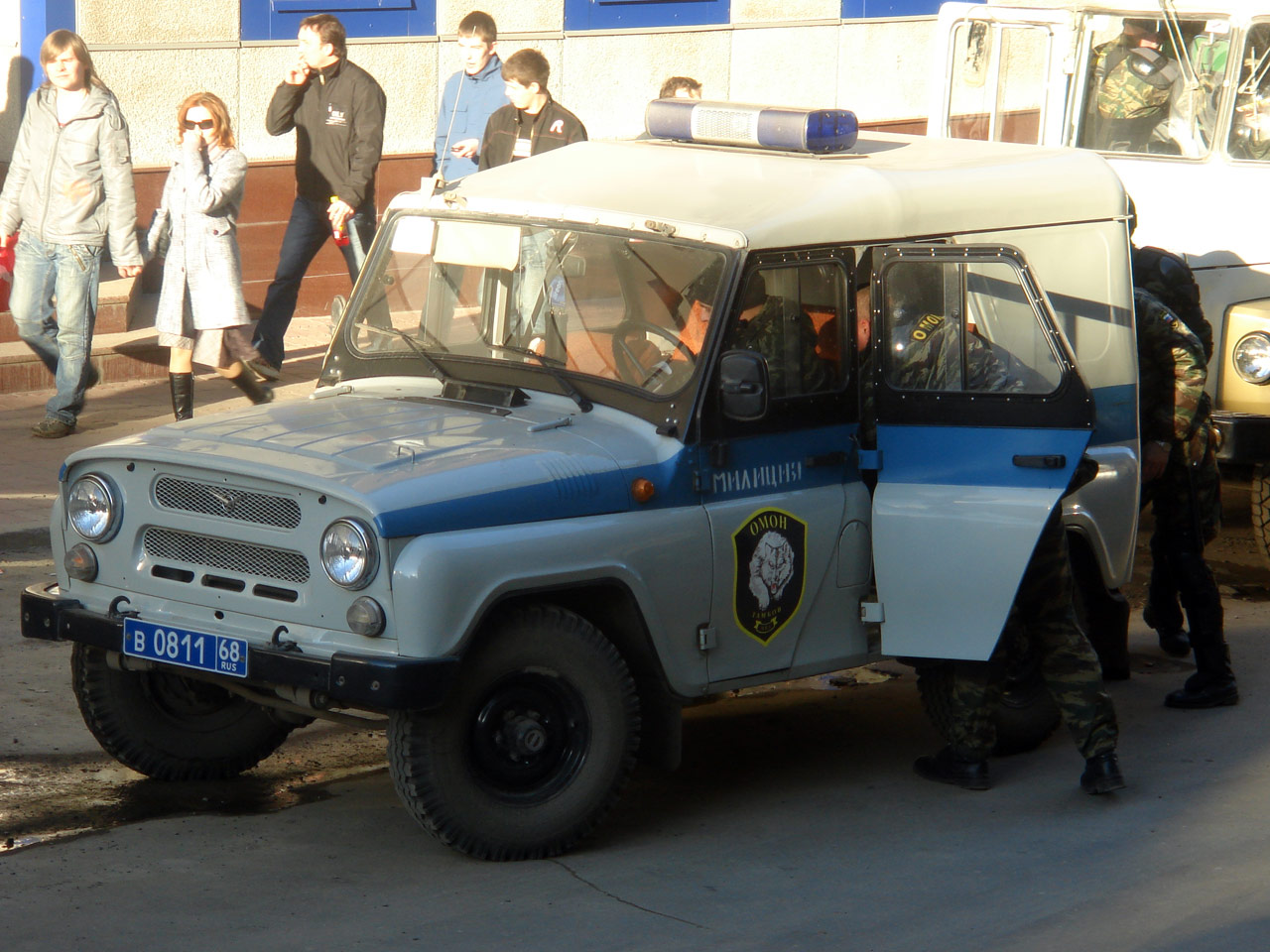
Tambov OMON UAZ-469.

=== Uniforms ===
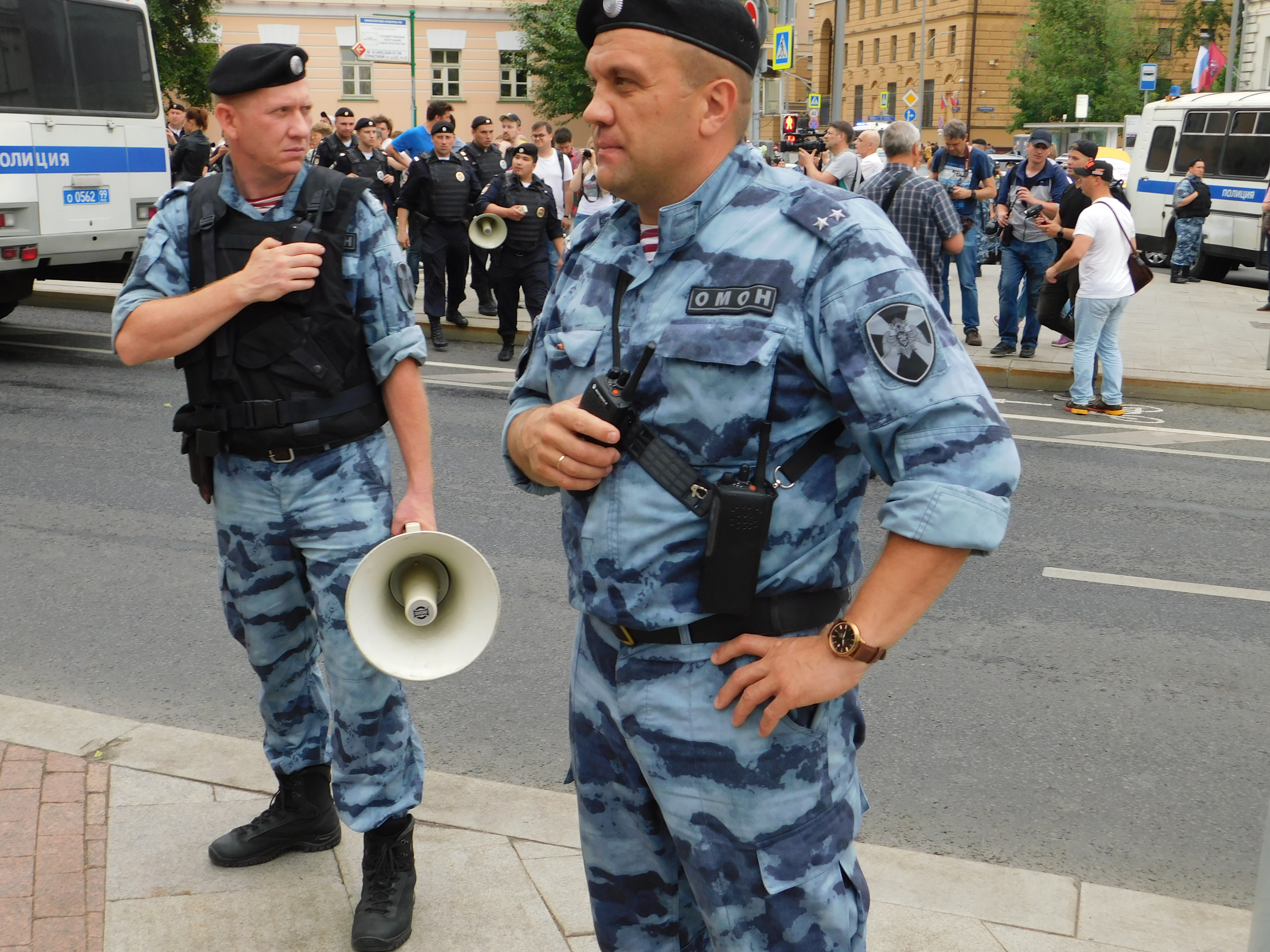
Members during the Gulonov March

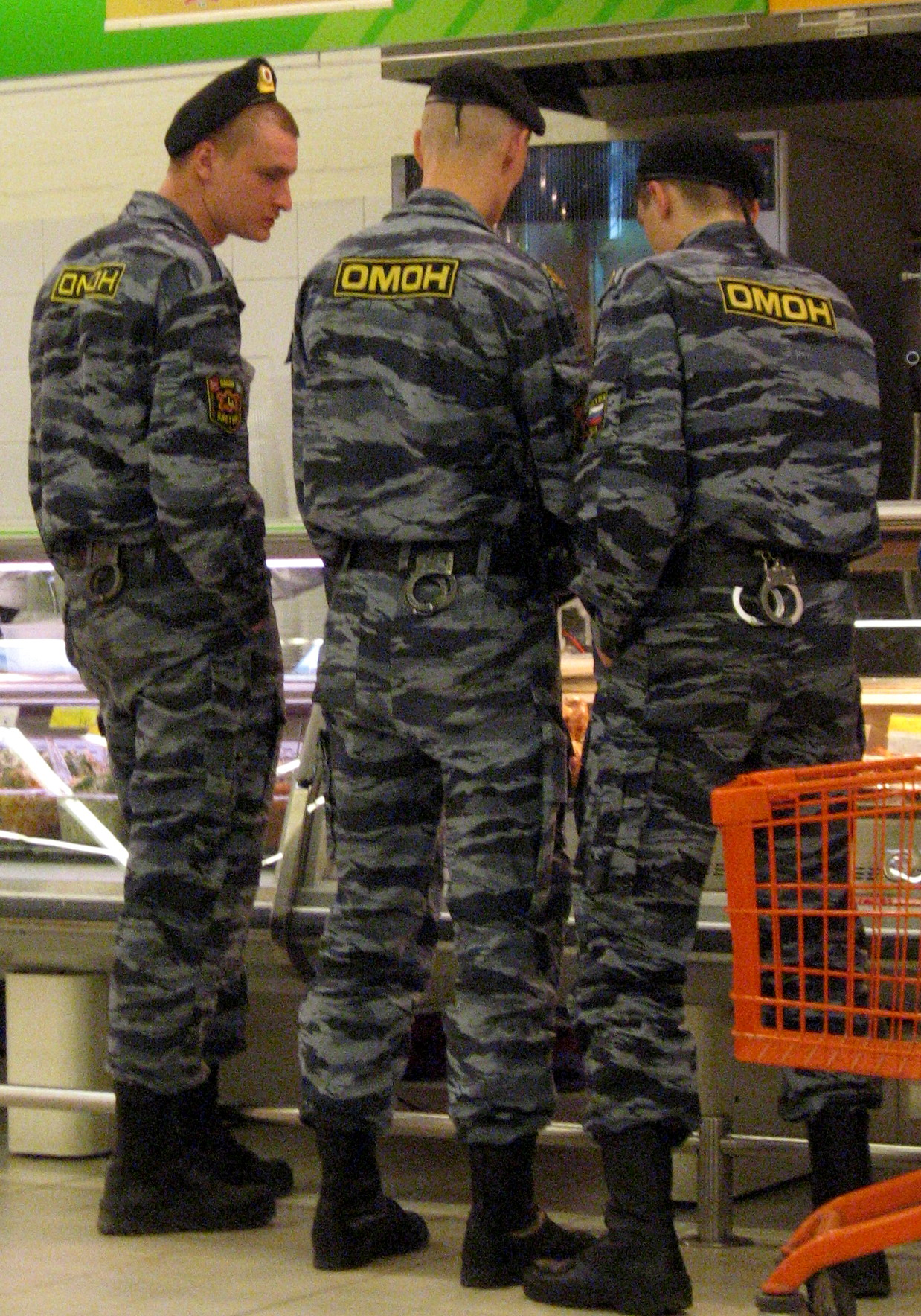
Members of the St. Petersburg OMON

OMON's headgear remains their signature black beret (they are thus sometimes called Black Berets), which they share with the Naval Infantry.

OMON, as part of the RosGvard, is transitioning to the Russian version of the ATACS LE (blue/grey) but units are still seen wearing the traditional Noch-91 uniform in all-black, and blue or gray Tigerstripe camouflage, a not uncommon sight has been a variety of Russian Army and Russian Internal Troops uniforms, often with (black) balaclava masks and/or helmets.

== Rest of the former Soviet Union ==
- OMON of Abkhazia
- OMON of Armenia
- XTPD/OPON – Azerbaijani paramilitary successor to OMON (forcibly disbanded by the government security forces after an OPON revolt in 1995)
- OMON (AMAP) – Belarusian paramilitary successor to OMON
- Arystan Commando Unit – Kazakh paramilitary successor to OMON, falling under the command of the National Security Committee of the Republic of Kazakhstan.
- OMON of Kyrgyzstan
- ARAS (Lithuania)
- BPDS/OPON – Moldovan paramilitary successor to OMON, falling under the command of the Ministry of Internal Affairs. It is officially known as the Special Purpose Police Brigade "Fulger".
- OMON of South Ossetia
- OMON of Tajikistan
- OMON of Transnistria
- Berkut – Ukrainian special police successor to OMON (disbanded following a revolution in 2014 and replaced with the Special Tasks Patrol Police). However, on 25 March 2014, Berkut units stationed in the Autonomous Republic of Crimea and Sevastopol defected to the Russian Ministry of Internal Affairs during the annexation of Crimea by Russia, after the territories were approved as federal subjects.^{A} There, the Berkut effectively became a Russian agency. Units were allowed to preserve their old name and now serve within the National Guard of Russia as the gendarmerie for Crimea.

== See also ==
- Internal Troops – paramilitary soldiers of the MVD in the Soviet Union and several post-Soviet states
- Zubr, a special police unit formed from the Moscow Region
- Russian Gendarmerie
