= Kārlis Ozoliņš (politician) =

Latvian politician (1905–1987)

Chairman of the Presidium of the Supreme Soviet of the Latvian SSR
- In office March 10, 1952 – November 27, 1959
- Preceded by: Augusts Kirhenšteins
- Succeeded by: Jānis Kalnbērziņš

Personal details
- Born: August 31, 1905 Ogre Municipality, Russian Empire
- Died: August 15, 1987 (aged 81) Riga, then part of Latvian SSR, Soviet Union
- Party: Communist Party of the Soviet Union
- Other political affiliations: Communist Party of Latvia
- Profession: Journalist

Kārlis Ozoliņš (August 31, 1905 – August 15, 1987) was a Latvian Soviet politician and journalist.

== Biography ==
Ozoliņš was born in to a poor peasant family. He became a member of social democratic organizations from his teenage years.

From 1924 he was involved in anti-state activities and joined the Communist Party of Latvia in 1926. In 1927 he was arrested and sentenced to three years in prison for the distribution of communist propaganda.

After his release, he became a professional revolutionary, led a college of propagandists and worked as a secretary of the underground Riga party committee. He was arrested for the second time and served a prison sentence and spent a total of ten years behind bars.

After the annexation of Latvia to the Soviet Union in 1940 he worked in the apparatus of the Central Committee of the Communist Party of Latvia and became the executive editor of the newspaper Cīņa. He was elected a member of the Central Committee and Politburo of the Communist Party of Latvia.

During the Great Patriotic War, he led the task force of the Central Committee of the Communist Party of Latvia for the organization of underground anti-fascist formations and partisan movements in the occupied republic and was responsible for the publication of the newspaper "For Soviet Latvia".

After the liberation of Latvia he continued to edit the newspaper of the LCP and became a secretary of the Central Committee. He was member of the Union of Latvian Writers.

From 1951 to 1952 deputy and from 1952 to 1959 he was Chairman of the Supreme Soviet of the Latvian SSR.

After the persecution of the "national communists" Ozoliņš was removed from his posts and demoted.

Until 1961 he once again served as deputy chairman of the Supreme Soviet.
