= List of first secretaries of the Central Committee of the Communist Party of Latvia =

The first secretary of the Central Committee of the Communist Party of Latvia was the leader of the Communist Party of Latvia, which was in turn a branch of the Communist Party of the Soviet Union.

Below is a list of office-holders:

Name	Entered office	Left office
Jānis Kalnbērziņš	August 25, 1940	November 25, 1959
Arvīds Pelše	November 25, 1959	April 15, 1966
Augusts Voss	April 15, 1966	April 14, 1984
Boris Pugo	April 14, 1984	October 4, 1988
Jānis Vagris	October 4, 1988	April 7, 1990
Alfrēds Rubiks	April 7, 1990	August 24, 1991

== Sources ==
- World Statesmen – Latvian Soviet Socialist Republic
