= Latvian Soviet Socialist Republic =

Soviet republic from 1940 to 1990

Coordinates: 56°57′29″N 24°06′09″E

Latvian Soviet Socialist Republic: Latvijas Padomju Sociālistiskā Republika (Latvian); Латвийская Советская Социалистическая Республика (Russian)
- 1940–1990; 1941–1944/45: German occupation
- Flag (1953–1990) State emblem (1940–1990)
- Motto: Visu zemju proletārieši, savienojieties! (Latvian) "Workers of the world, unite!"
- Anthem: Anthem of the Latvian Soviet Socialist Republic
- Location of annexed Latvia (red) within the Soviet Union (red & light yellow)
- Status: Internationally unrecognized territory occupied by the Soviet Union (1940–1941, 1944–1990)
- Capital: Riga
- Common languages: Latvian · Russian
- Ethnic groups (1989): 52% Latvians; 33% Russians; 4% Belarusians; 3% Ukrainians; 2% Poles; 1% Lithuanians; 1% Jews; 2% Others
- Religion: Secular state (de jure); State atheism (de facto)
- Demonyms: Latvian; Soviet
- Government: Unitary communist state (1940–1989); Unitary parliamentary republic (1989–1990)
- First Secretary
  - 1940–1959: Jānis Kalnbērziņš
  - 1959–1966: Arvīds Pelše
  - 1966–1984: Augusts Voss
  - 1984–1988: Boris Pugo
  - 1988–1990: Jānis Vagris
- Head of state
  - 1940–1952 (first): Augusts Kirhenšteins
  - 1988–1990 (last): Anatolijs Gorbunovs
- Head of government
  - 1940–1959 (first): Vilis Lācis
  - 1988–1990 (last): Vilnis Edvīns Bresis
- Legislature: Supreme Soviet
- Historical era: World War II · Cold War
  - Soviet occupation: 17 June 1940
  - SSR established: 21 July 1940
  - Illegally annexed by USSR, Latvia continued de jure: 5 August 1940
  - Nazi occupation: 1941–1945
  - Soviet re-occupation SSR re-established: 1944/1945
  - Declaration of state sovereignty: 28 July 1989
  - Independence restored: 4 May 1990
  - Independence recognized by the State Council of the Soviet Union: 6 September 1991

Area
- 1989: 64,589 km^{2} (24,938 sq mi)

Population
  - 1989: 2,666,567
- Currency: Soviet rouble (Rbl) (SUR)
- Calling code: +7 013
Preceded by	Succeeded by
Latvia	Latvia
- Today part of: Latvia

The Latvian Soviet Socialist Republic (Also known as the Latvian SSR, or Soviet Latvia) was a de facto constituent republic of the Soviet Union covering the occupied and annexed territory of Latvia from 1940 to 1941, and then from 1944 until 1990.

The Soviet occupation and annexation of Latvia began between June and August 1939, according to the agreed terms of the secret protocol of the Molotov–Ribbentrop Pact. In 1939, Latvia was forced to give military bases on its soil to the Soviet Union, and in 1940 the Red Army moved into Latvia, effectively annexing it into the Soviet Union.

The territory changed sides during World War II, with Nazi Germany occupying a large portion of Latvian territory from 1941 until the Red Army entered Latvia in 1944 with the final territory occupied by the Germans liberated in 1945. The Soviet occupation of the Baltic states from 1939 to 1940 and then from 1944 to 1991 was widely considered illegal by the international community and human rights organizations.

Soviet instability during the 1980s and the dissolution of the Soviet Union in 1991 provided an opportunity for Latvia to restore its independence.

== Creation in 1940 ==
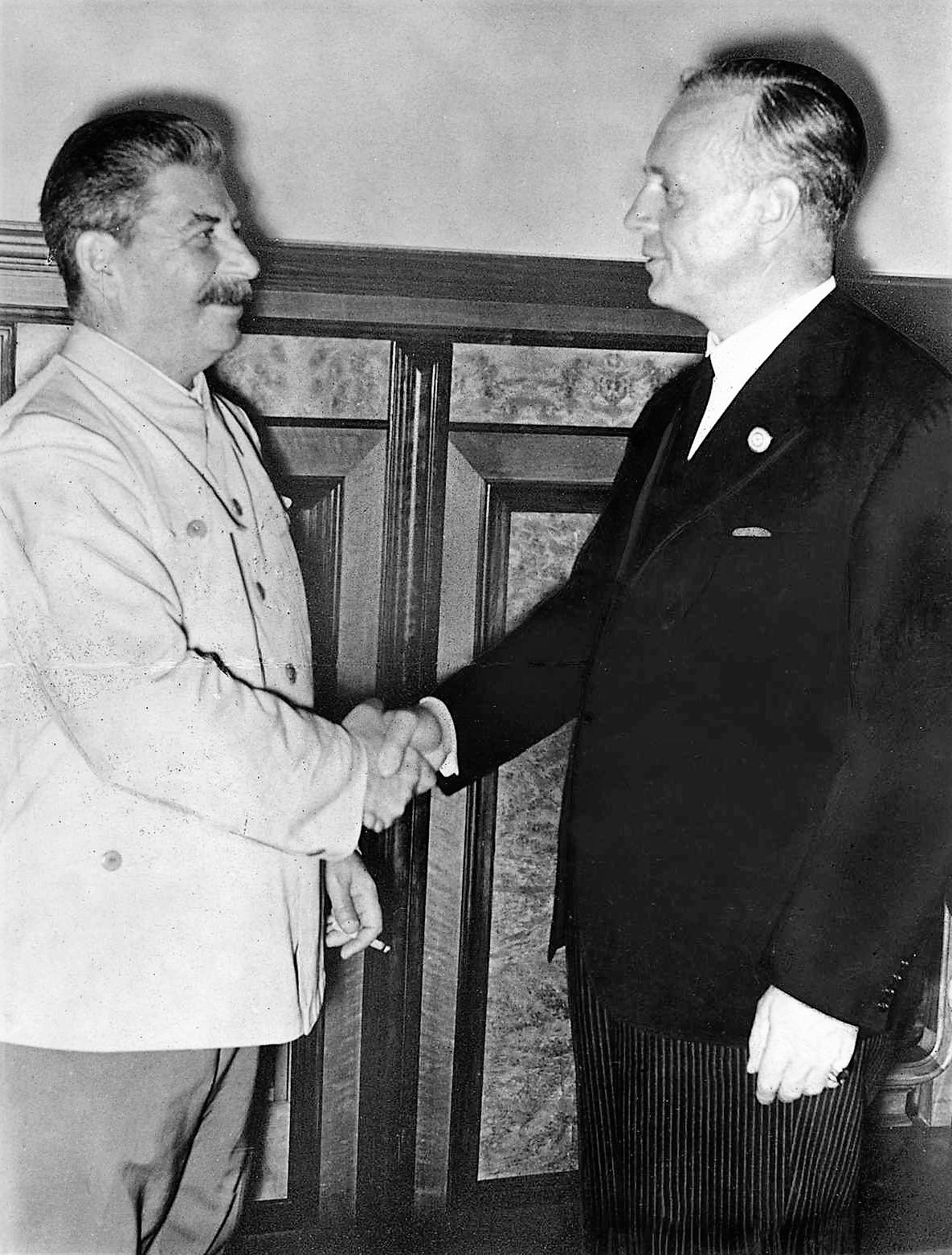
Joseph Stalin and Joachim von Ribbentrop

On 24 September 1939, USSR bombers entered the airspace of Estonia, flying numerous intelligence-gathering operations. On 25 September, Moscow demanded that Estonia sign a Soviet–Estonian Mutual Assistance Treaty to allow the USSR to establish military bases and station troops on its soil. Latvia was next in line, as the USSR demanded the signing of a similar treaty. The authoritarian government of Kārlis Ulmanis accepted the ultimatum, signing the Soviet–Latvian Mutual Assistance Treaty on 5 October 1939. On 16 June 1940, after the USSR had already invaded Lithuania, it issued an ultimatum to Latvia, followed by the Soviet occupation of Latvia on 17 June.

Soviet Foreign Minister Vyacheslav Molotov had accused Latvia and the Baltic states of forming a military conspiracy against the Soviet Union. Moscow presented ultimatums, demanding new concessions, including the replacement of governments with new ones, "determined to fulfill the treaties of friendship sincerely" and allowing an unlimited number of troops to enter the three countries. Hundreds of thousands of Soviet troops entered Estonia, Latvia, and Lithuania. These additional Soviet military forces far outnumbered their individual armies.

The Ulmanis government decided that, given the conditions of international isolation and the overwhelming Soviet force both on the borders and inside the country, it was better to avoid bloodshed and an unwinnable war. The Latvian Army did not fire a shot and was quickly decimated by purges, then incorporated into the Soviet Army.

Ulmanis' government resigned and was replaced by a left-wing government created under instructions from the USSR embassy. Until the election of the People's Parliament on the 14/15 July 1940, there were no public statements about governmental plans to introduce a Soviet political order or to join the Soviet Union. Soon after the occupation, the Communist Party of Latvia became the only legal party and presented the "Latvian Working People's Bloc" for the elections. It was the only permitted participant in the election after an attempt by other politicians to include the Democratic Bloc (an alliance of all banned Latvian parties, except the Social Democratic Workers' Party) on the ballot was prevented by the government. Its office was closed, election leaflets confiscated, and its leaders arrested.

The election results were fabricated; the Soviet press released them so early that they appeared in a London newspaper 24 hours before the polls closed. All Soviet army personnel present in the country were allowed to vote.

The newly elected People's Parliament convened on 21 July and announced both the creation of the Latvian SSR and the request of admission into the Soviet Union. A change in the constitutional order of the state was illegal under the Constitution of Latvia because a change was only possible after a plebiscite with two-thirds of the electorate's approval. On 5 August, the Supreme Soviet of the Soviet Union completed the annexation process and accepted the Latvian petition, formally incorporating Latvia into the Soviet Union.

Following the annexation, power in the republic was held by the First Secretary of the Communist Party of Latvia, while the titular head of the republic (Chairman of the Presidium of the Supreme Soviet), and the head of the executive (the Chairman of the Soviet of the Ministers), were in subordinate positions. Therefore, the history of Soviet Latvia can broadly be divided into the periods of rule by the First Secretaries: Jānis Kalnbērziņš, Arvīds Pelše, Augusts Voss, and Boris Pugo.

== Era of Kalnbērziņš, 1940–1959 ==
=== The Horrible Year, 1940–41 ===
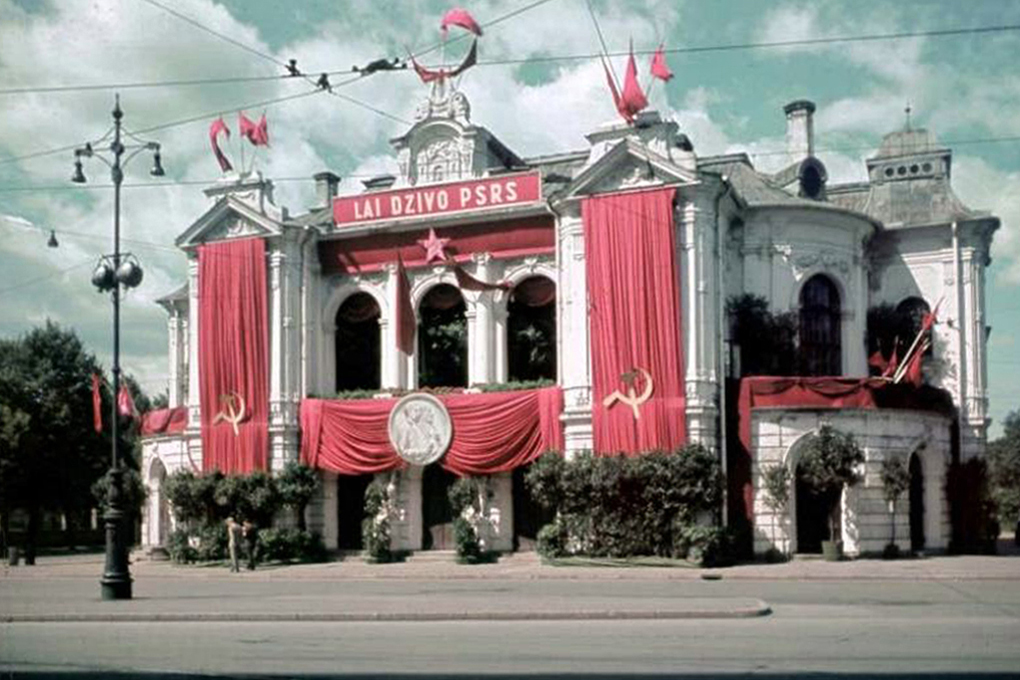
The National Theater housed the People's Parliament in 1940

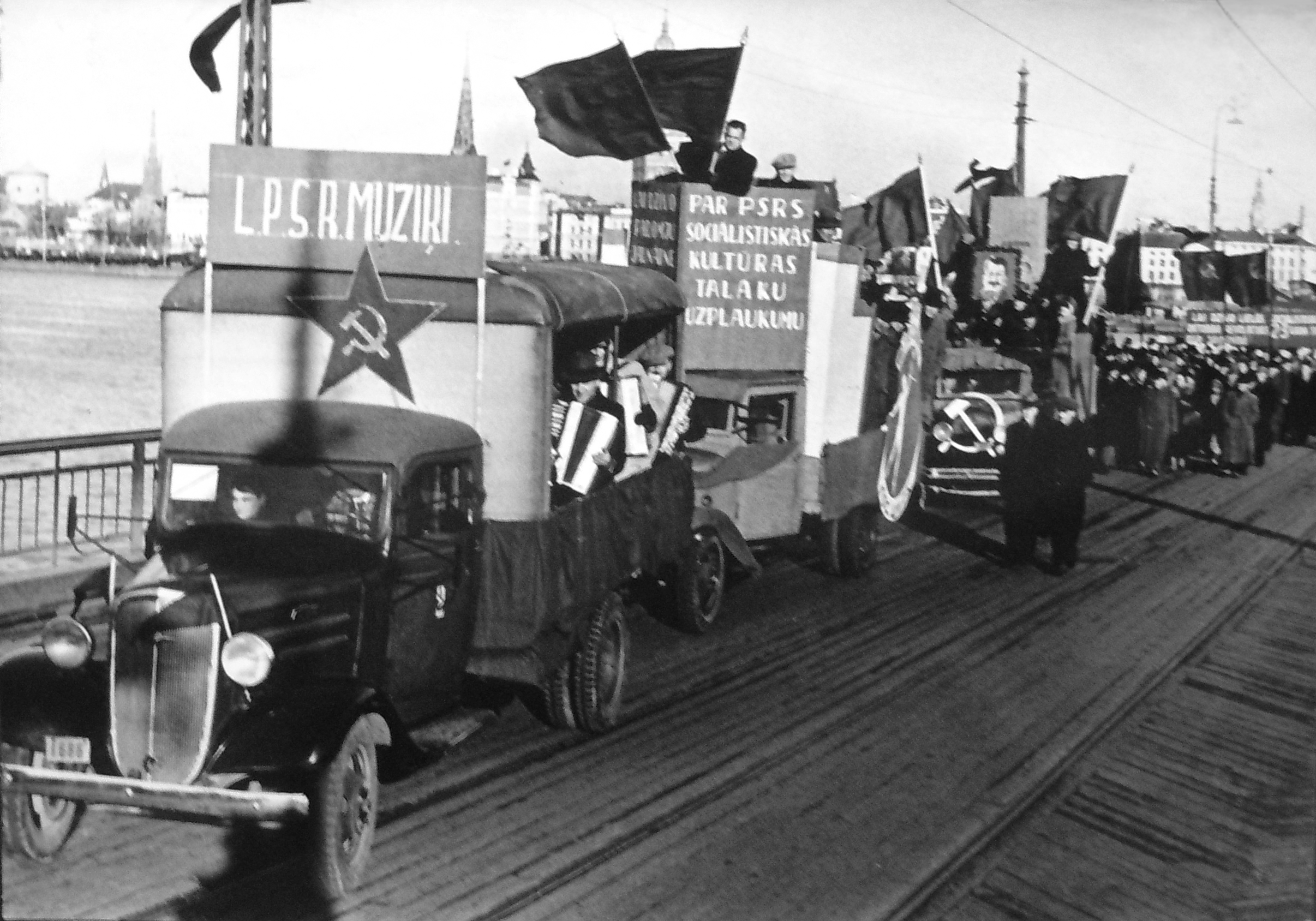
Demonstration in Riga on 7 November 1940

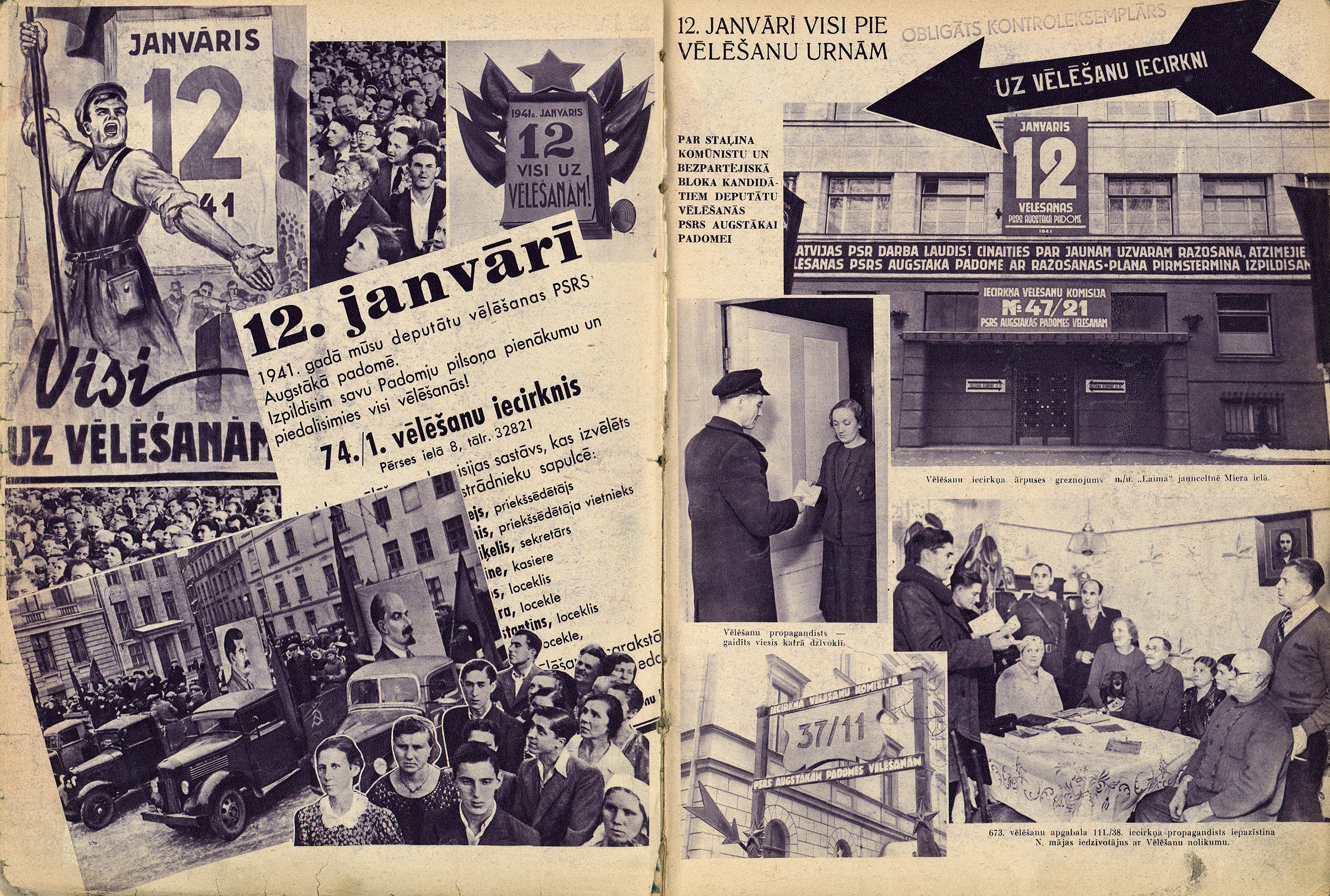
Poster of the Latvian SSR Supreme Soviet Election on 12 January 1941

In the following months of 1940, the Soviet Constitution and criminal code (copied from Russian) were introduced. The elections of July 1940 were followed by elections to the Supreme Soviet of the Soviet Union in January 1941. The remaining Baltic Germans and anyone that could claim to be one emigrated to Nazi Germany.

On 7 August 1940, all print media and printing houses were nationalized. Most existing magazines and newspapers were discontinued or appeared under new Soviet names. In November 1940, banning books began; in total, 4,000 titles were banned and removed from circulation. Arrests of authors like Aleksandrs Grīns occurred during this time.

As Latvia implemented a sweeping land reform after the independence, most farms were too small for nationalization. While rumors of impending collectivization were officially denied in 1940 and 52,000 landless peasants were given small plots of up to 10 ha, in early 1941, preparations for collectivization began. The small size of land plots and imposition of the production quotas and high taxes meant that independent farmers would likely go bankrupt and had to establish collective farms.

Arrests and deportations to the Soviet Union began before Latvia was annexed. Initially, they were limited to the most prominent political and military leaders like President Kārlis Ulmanis, War Minister Jānis Balodis, and Army Chief Krišjānis Berķis, who were arrested in July 1940. The Soviet NKVD arrested most of the White Russian émigrés, who had found refuge in Latvia. Very soon, purges reached the upper echelons of the puppet government when Minister of Welfare Jūlijs Lācis was arrested.

==== 14 June deportations ====
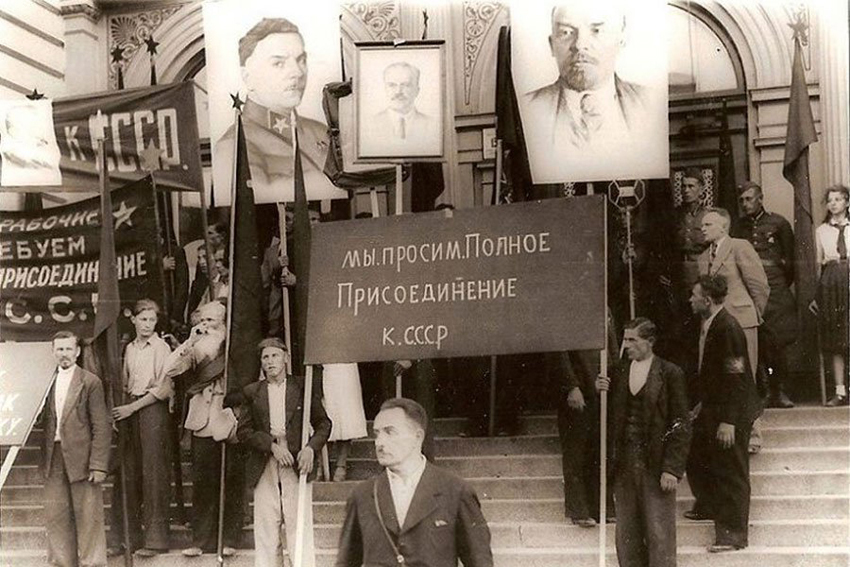
Soviet propaganda demonstration in Liepāja, 1940. Posters in Russian say: "We demand full accession to the USSR!"

In early 1941, the Soviet central government planned the mass deportation of anti-Soviet elements from the occupied Baltic states of Lithuania, Latvia, and Estonia. In preparation, General Ivan Serov, Deputy People's Commissar of Public Security of the Soviet Union, signed the Serov Instructions, "Regarding the Procedure for Carrying out the Deportation of Anti-Soviet Elements from Lithuania, Latvia, and Estonia." During the night of 13 to 14 June 1941, 15,424 inhabitants of Latvia — including 1,771 Jews and 742 ethnic Russians — were deported to camps and special settlements, most of which were in Siberia.

Among the deported were such obvious candidates as former politicians, wealthy bourgeois and farmers, police, members of Aizsargi, and NGO leaders, even philatelists and enthusiasts of Esperanto were included in the June deportation as unreliable elements. 600 Latvian officers were arrested in the Litene army camp, and many were executed on the spot. Many political prisoners were summarily executed in prisons across Latvia during the hasty Soviet retreat after the German invasion of the Soviet Union. Latvia lost 35,000 people during the first year of Soviet rule.

=== World War II, 1941–1945 ===
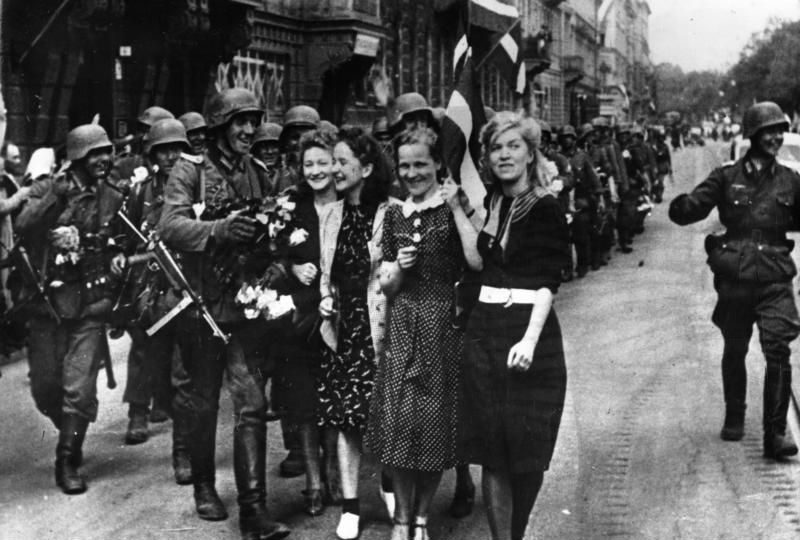
German soldiers greeted in Riga on 1 July 1941

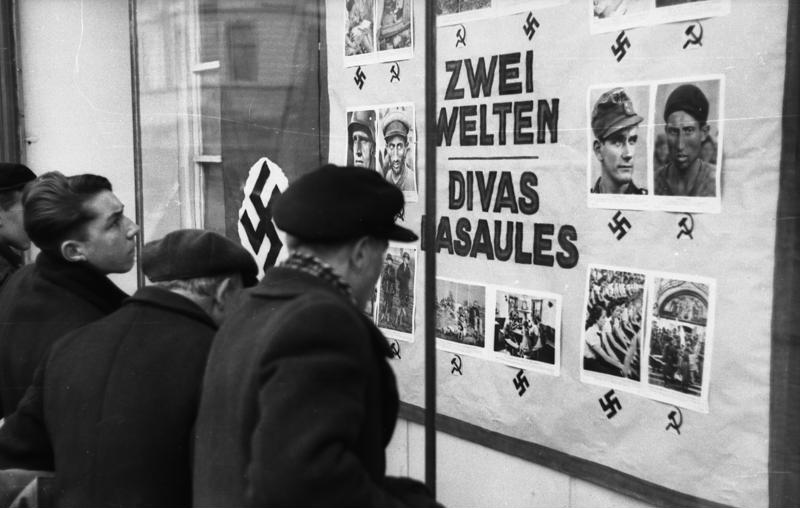
"Two Worlds" – an anti-communist and anti-Semitic Nazi propaganda board in Latvia, summer 1941

The start of Operation Barbarossa cut short immediate plans to deport several hundred thousand more people. German troops occupied Riga on 1 July 1941. A few days later, Reichskommissariat Ostland, was established incorporating the territories of Latvia, Estonia, Lithuania, and parts of Byelorussia.

During the short interregnum period, Latvians created two political bodies that sought to restore independent Latvia: the Central Organizing Committee for Liberated Latvia and the Provisional State Council.

Immediately after the installment of Nazi German authority, the process of eliminating the Jewish and Gypsy populations began, with many killings taking place in Rumbula.

Massacres were mainly committed by the Einsatzgruppe A, the Wehrmacht, and Marines (in Liepāja), as well as Latvian collaborators, which included the 500 to 1,500 members of the Arajs Kommando (which alone killed around 26,000 Jews) and the 2,000 or more Latvian members of the SD. By the end of 1941, almost the entire Jewish population had been killed or placed in the death camps. In addition, some 25,000 Jews were brought from Germany, Austria, and present-day Czechia, of whom around 20,000 were killed. The Holocaust claimed approximately 85,000 lives in Latvia, of whom the vast majority were Jews.

A large number of Latvians resisted the German occupation. The resistance movement was divided between the pro-independence politicians of the Latvian Central Council and the armed Soviet partisan units under the Latvian Partisan Movement Headquarters (латвийский штаб партизанского движения) in Moscow. The commander was of the communists was Arturs Sproģis.

The Nazis planned to Germanize the Baltics by settling some 520,000 German settlers there 20–25 years after the war. In 1943 and 1944, two divisions of Latvian Legion were created through a forced mobilization and made a part of the Waffen SS to help Germany fight the Red Army.

=== Stalinism re-imposed, 1945–1953 ===
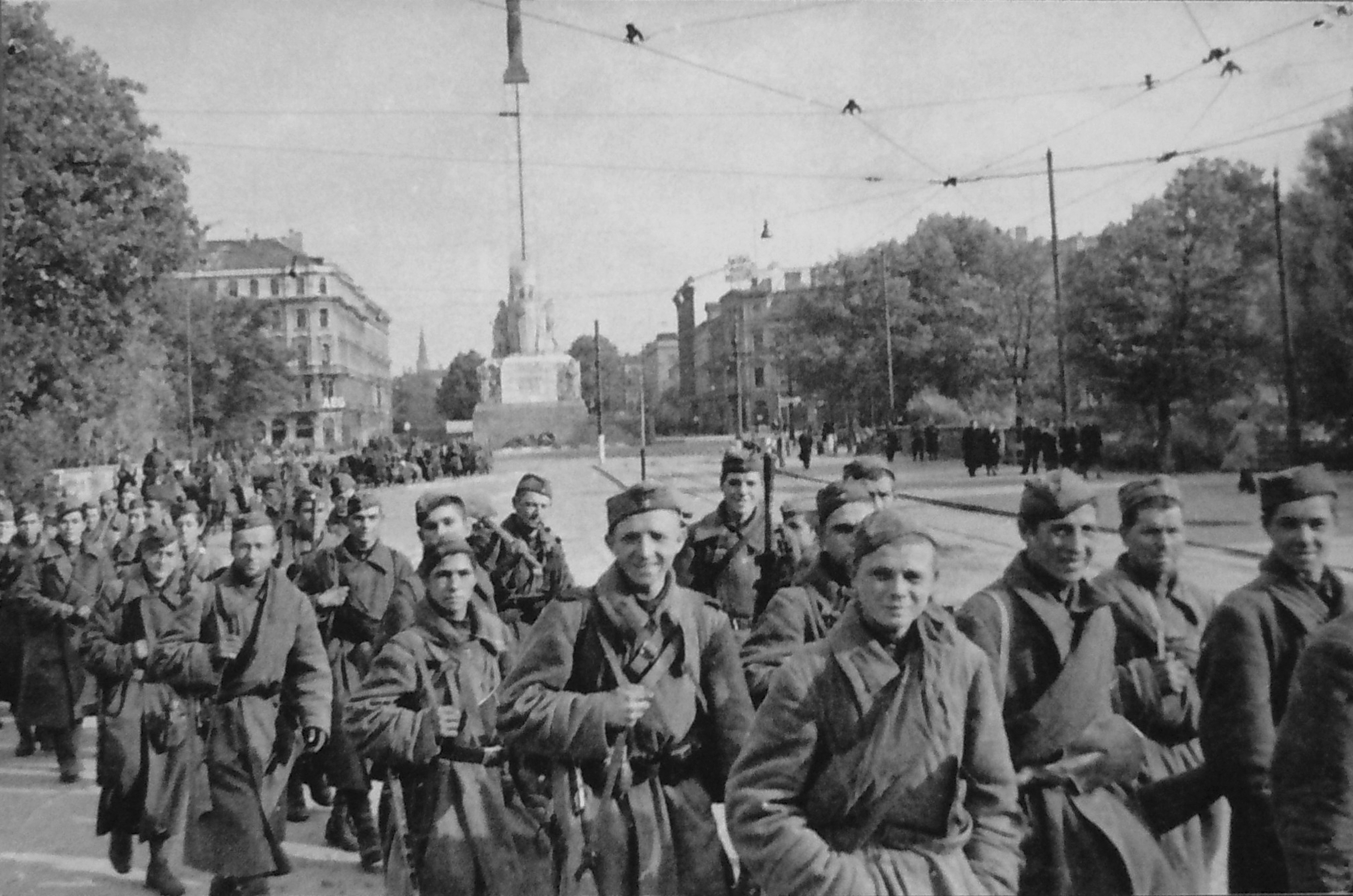
Soviet soldiers in Riga, October 1944

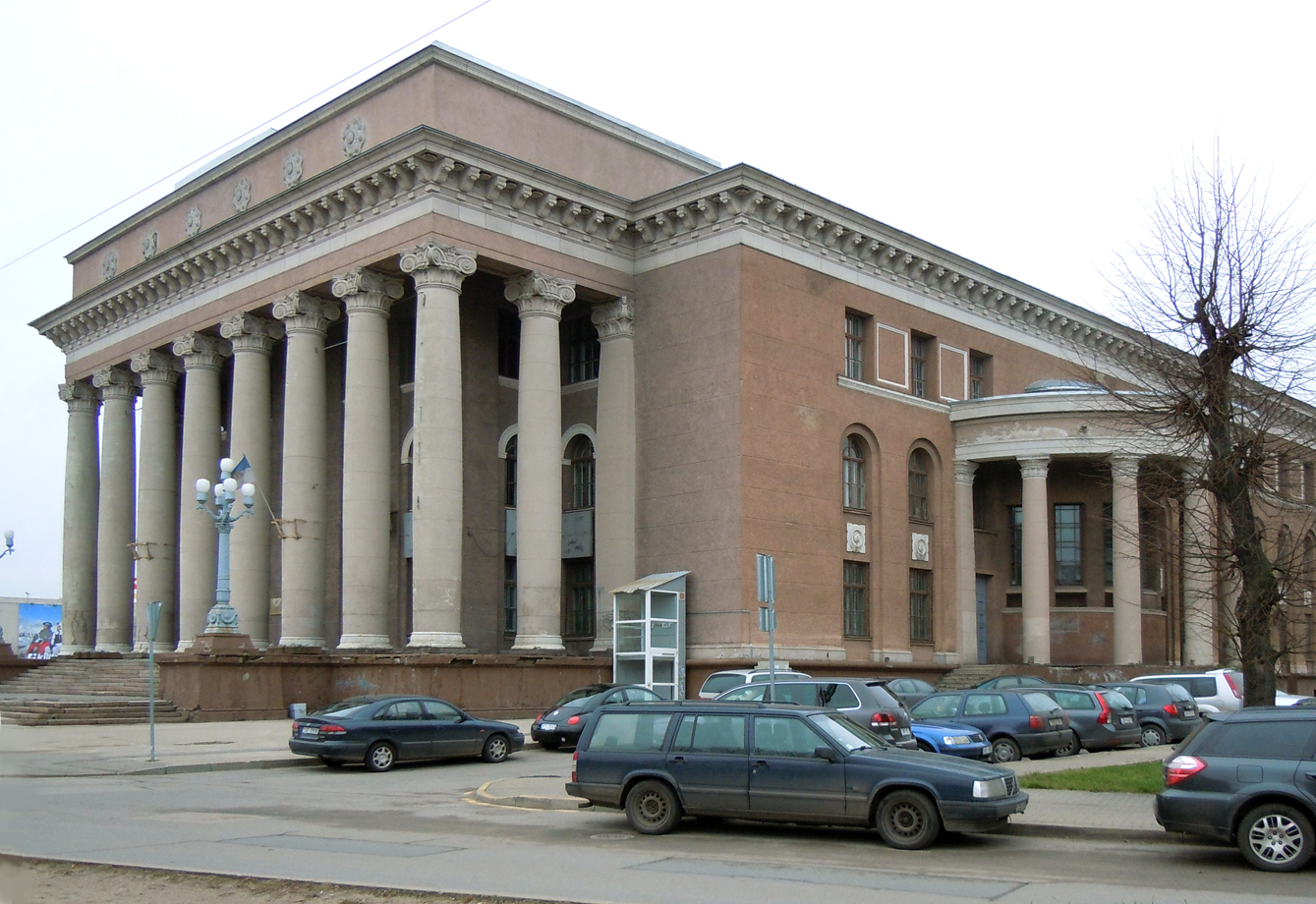
VEF palace of culture

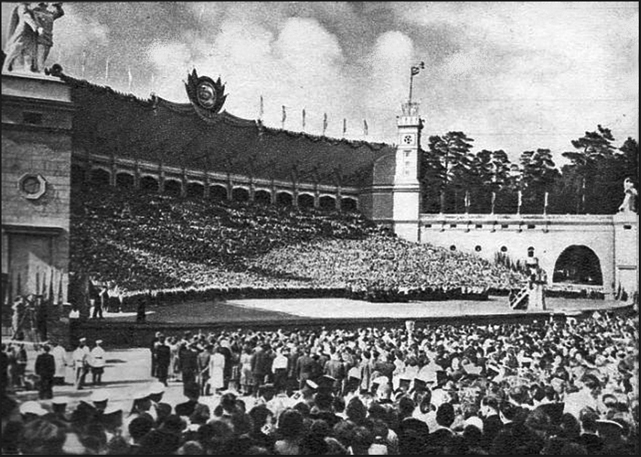
Song and Dance festival, 1955

In the middle of 1944, when the Soviet Operation Bagration reached Latvia, heavy fighting took place between German and Soviet troops, which ended with a stalemate and the creation of the Courland Pocket, which allowed some 130,000 Latvians to escape to Sweden and Germany.

During the war, both occupying forces conscripted Latvians into their armies, which increased the loss of the nation's "live resources." In Courland, Latvian Legion units fought battles against Latvians of the Red Army.

Latvia lost some 20% of its population during World War II. In 1944 part of Abrene District, about 2% of Latvia's territory, was illegally ceded to the RSFSR.

In 1944, the Soviets immediately began to reinstate the Soviet system. After re-establishing military control over the country, in February 1946, elections of the Soviet Union's Supreme Soviet were held, followed, in February 1947, by Latvian Supreme Soviet elections and only in January 1948 elections to the local Soviets.

==== Guerrilla movement ====
After the German surrender, it became clear that Soviet forces were there to stay and Latvian national partisans began their fight against the Soviet Union. At their peak, some 10,000–15,000 partisans in disorganized units fought local battles against Soviets, NKVD troops and Soviet government representatives. Forest brothers consisted not only of the former Legionnaires or German supporters but also of men who were trying to avoid Soviet conscription, dispossessed farmers, and even priests and school pupils who wrote and distributed patriotic leaflets and provided shelter to partisans. Many believed that a new war between the Western powers and the Soviet Union was imminent and expected Latvia to be liberated soon. After the 1949 deportations and collectivization, the resistance movement decreased sharply, with the last few individuals surrendering in 1956 when amnesty was offered. The last holdout was Jānis Pīnups, who hid from authorities until 1995.

==== Deportations of 1949 ====
120,000 Latvian inhabitants deemed disloyal by the Soviets were imprisoned or deported to Soviet labor camps (the Gulag). Some escaped arrest and joined the Forest Brothers.

On 25 March 1949, 43,000 primarily rural residents ("kulaks") were deported to Siberia and northern Kazakhstan in Operation Priboi, which was implemented in all three Baltic States and was approved in Moscow on 29 January 1949. Almost 30% of those deported were children under 16.

==== Collectivization ====
In the post-war period, Latvia was forced to adopt Soviet farming methods, and the economic infrastructure developed in the 1920s and 1930s was eradicated. Farms belonging to refugees were confiscated, German supporters had their farm sizes sharply reduced, and much of the farmland became state-owned. The remaining farmers' taxes and obligatory produce delivery quotas were increased until individual farming became impossible. Many farmers killed their cattle and moved to cities. In 1948 collectivization began in earnest and was intensified after the March 1949 deportations, and by the end of the year, 93% of farms were collectivized.

Collective farming was extremely unprofitable as farmers had to plant and harvest according to the state plan and not the actual harvest conditions, and farmers were paid close to nothing for their produce. Grain production in Latvia collapsed from 1.37 million tons in 1940 to 0.73 million tons in 1950 and to 0.43 million tons in 1956. Only in 1965 did Latvia reach the meat and dairy output levels of 1940.

==== Russian dominance ====
During the first post-war years, Moscow's control was enforced by the Special Bureau of CPSU Central Committee, led by Mikhail Suslov. To ensure total control over the local Communist party, Ivan Lebedev, a Russian, was elected the Second Secretary. This tradition continued until the end of the Soviet system. The lack of politically reliable local cadres meant the Soviets increasingly placed Russians in Party and government leadership positions. Many Russian Latvian Communists who had survived the so-called 1937–38 "Latvian Operation" during the Great Purge were sent back to the homeland of their parents. Most of these Soviets did not speak Latvian, and this only enforced the wall of distrust against the local population. By 1953 Latvia's Communist Party had 42,000 members, half of whom were Latvians.

Hundreds of thousands of Russians were moved to Latvia to replace the lost population (due to war casualties, refugees to the West, and deportees to the East) and to implement a heavy industrialization program. An extensive program of Russification was initiated, limiting the use of Latvian and minority languages. In addition, the Russian people's leading and progressive role throughout Latvian history was heavily emphasized in school books, arts, and literature. The remaining poets, writers, and painters had to follow the strict canons of socialist realism and live in constant fear of being accused of some ideological mistake that could lead to banning from publication or even arrest.

=== National Communists, 1953–1959 ===
During the short rule of Lavrentiy Beria in 1953, the policy of giving more power to local communists and respecting local languages was introduced. More freedoms came after the 1956 de-Stalinization. Some 30,000 survivors of Soviet deportations began returning to Latvia. Many were barred from working in certain professions or returning to their homes.

Soon after the death of Stalin, the number of Latvians in the Communist Party began to increase. By this time many locally-born communists had achieved positions of power and began advocating a program that centered on ending the inflow of Russian-speaking immigrants, ending the growth of heavy industry, and creating light industries better suited for local needs, increasing the role and power of the locally born communists, enforcing the Latvian language as the state language. This group was led by Eduards Berklavs, who in 1957 became the vice-chairman of the Council of Ministers. Orders were issued that non-Latvian Communists should learn some Latvian or lose their jobs within two years.

They were opposed by the Russian Latvian communists who had been born to Latvian parents in Russia or the Soviet Union, had returned to Latvia only after World War II, and usually did not speak or avoided speaking Latvian in public. They were supported by the politically influential officer corps of the Baltic Military District. In 1958 Soviet education made learning national languages optional.

In April 1959, a fact-finding delegation from Soviet Central Committee visited Riga. During Nikita Khrushchev's visit to Riga in June 1959, hard-line elements complained about the nationalist tendencies in the Party and, with the blessing from Moscow, started purges of national communists and local communists, who had been in power since 1940. In November 1959, the long-serving First Secretary of the Party Kalnbērziņš and Prime Minister Vilis Lācis resigned from their posts and were replaced by hardliners. During the next three years, some 2,000 national communists were dismissed from their positions and moved to insignificant posts in the countryside or Russia.

The first post-war census in 1959 showed that the number of Latvians since 1935 had declined by 170,000, while Russians had increased by 388,000, Belarusians by 35,000, and Ukrainians by 28,000.

Because Latvia had still maintained a well-developed infrastructure and educated specialists, it was decided in Moscow that some of the Soviet Union's most advanced manufacturing factories were to be based in Latvia. New industries were created in Latvia, including a major machinery factory RAF, and electrotechnical factories, along with some food and oil processing plants. TV broadcasts from Riga started in 1954, the first in the Baltics.

== Era of Pelše, 1959–1966 ==
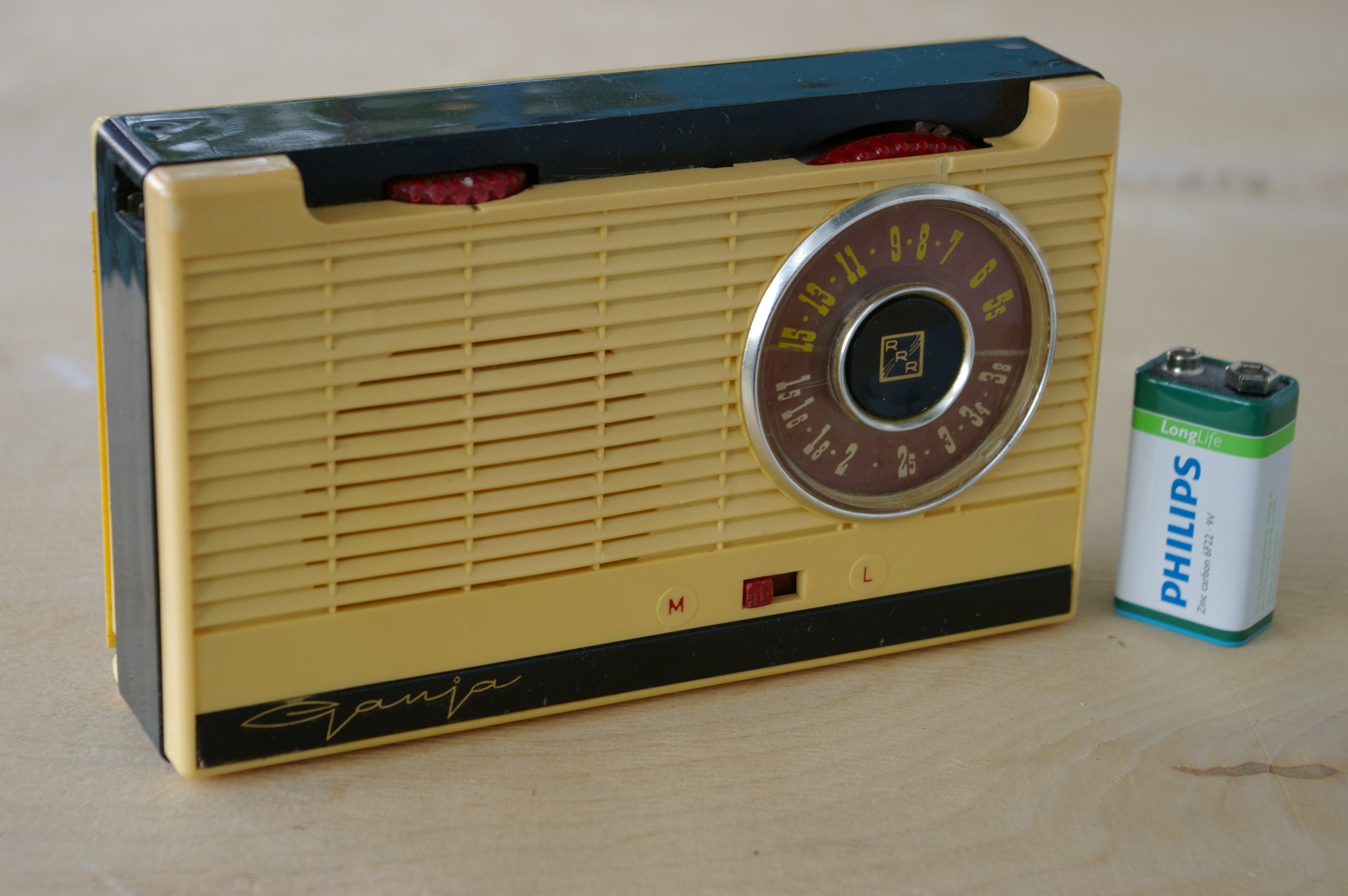
Gauja portable radio, 1961

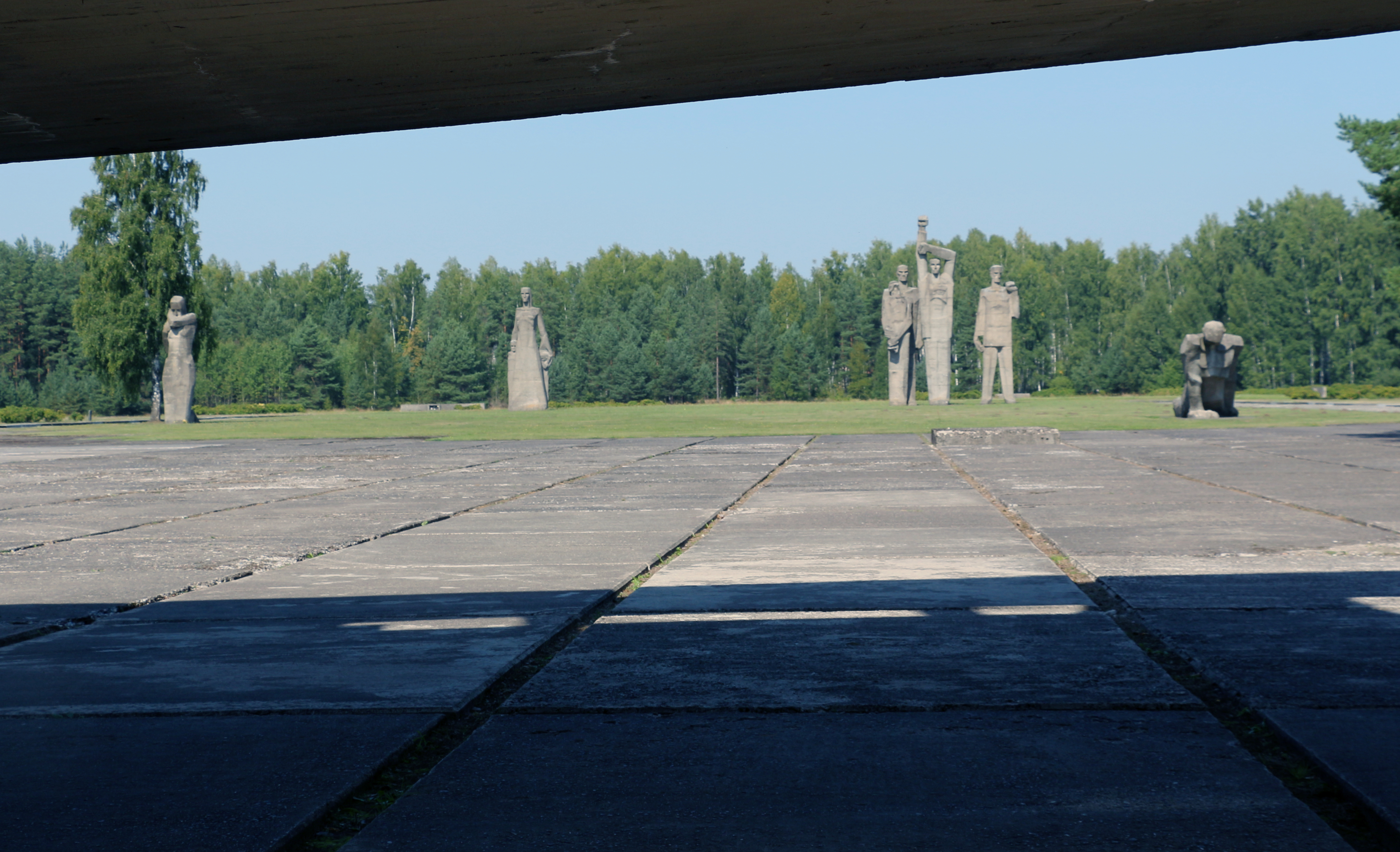
Salaspils police prison memorial, opened in 1967

From 1959 to 1962, leading Latvian national communists were purged as Arvīds Pelše enforced his power.

In 1961, Pelše officially banned the Latvian midsummer Jāņi celebrations along with other Latvian traditions and folk customs. In November 1959 Pelše also instigated the purge of "nascent nationalists" from the Latvian government. Almost 2,000 members of the government were removed.

Between 1959 and 1968, nearly 130,000 Russian speakers immigrated to Latvia and began working in the large industrial factories that were rapidly built. The newly arrived immigrants were the first to receive apartments in the newly built micro-districts. Large factories, employing tens of thousands of recently arrived immigrants, and entirely dependent on resources from faraway Soviet regions, produced products – most of which were sent back to other Soviet republics. Many of the new factories were under the All-Union ministry and military jurisdiction, thus operating outside the planned economy of Soviet Latvia. Latvia's VEF and Radiotehnika factories specialized in producing radios, telephones and sound systems. Most of the Soviet railway carriages were made by Rīgas Vagonbūves Rūpnīca and minibuses by Riga Autobus Factory.

In 1962, Riga began receiving Russian gas for industrial needs and domestic heating. This allowed large-scale construction of new micro-districts and high-rises to begin. In 1965, the Pļaviņas Hydroelectric Power Station began producing electricity.

== Era of Voss, 1966–1984 ==
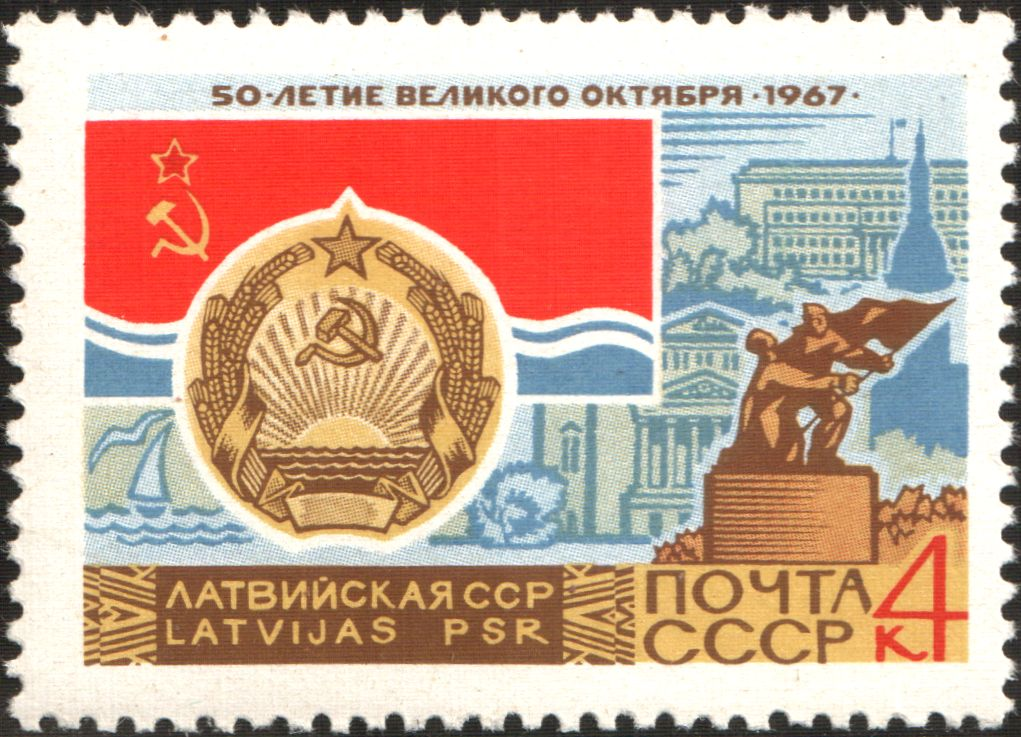
Soviet stamp in honour of the 50th anniversary of the October Revolution, 1967

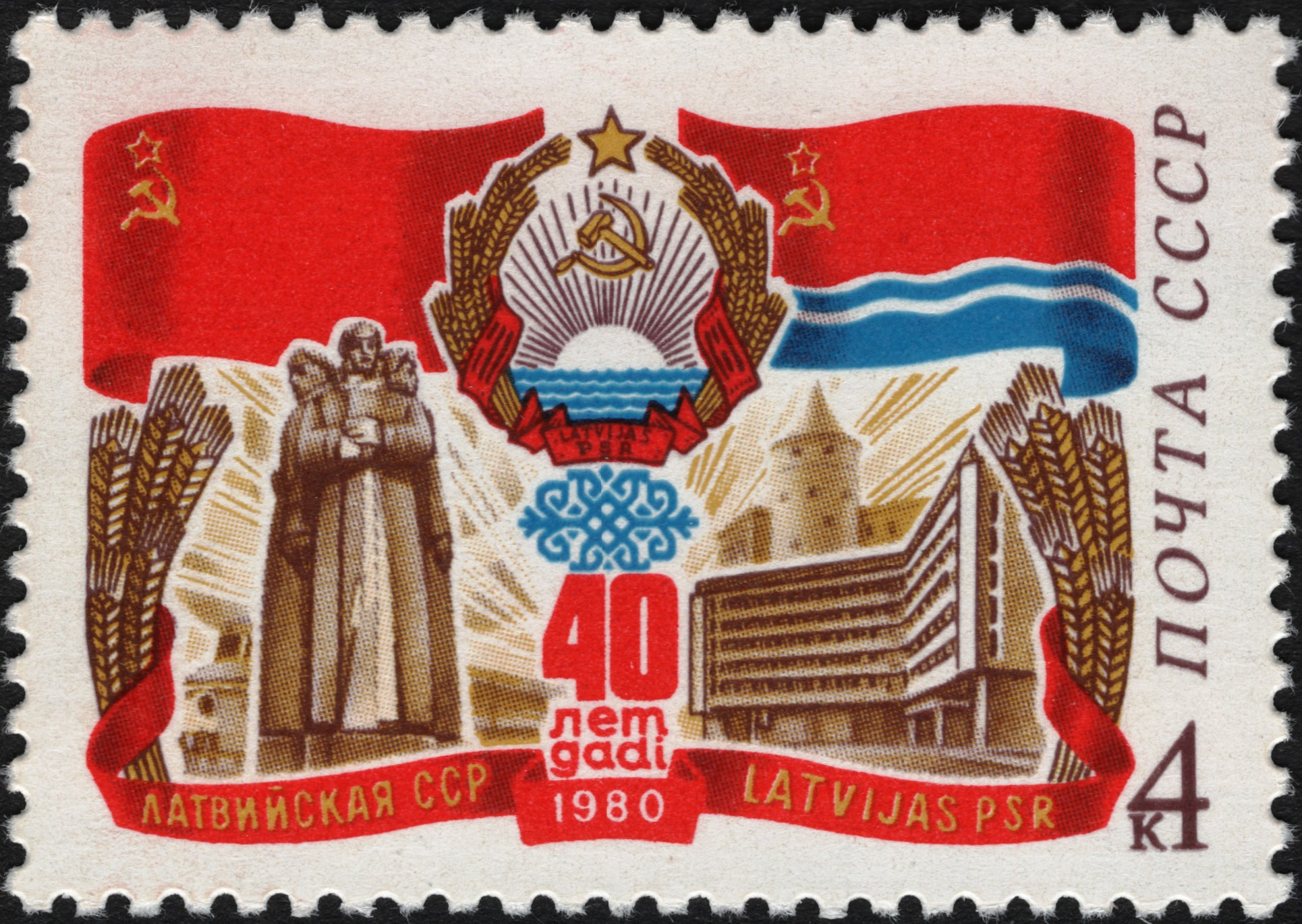
Soviet stamp celebrating 40 years of the Latvian SSR

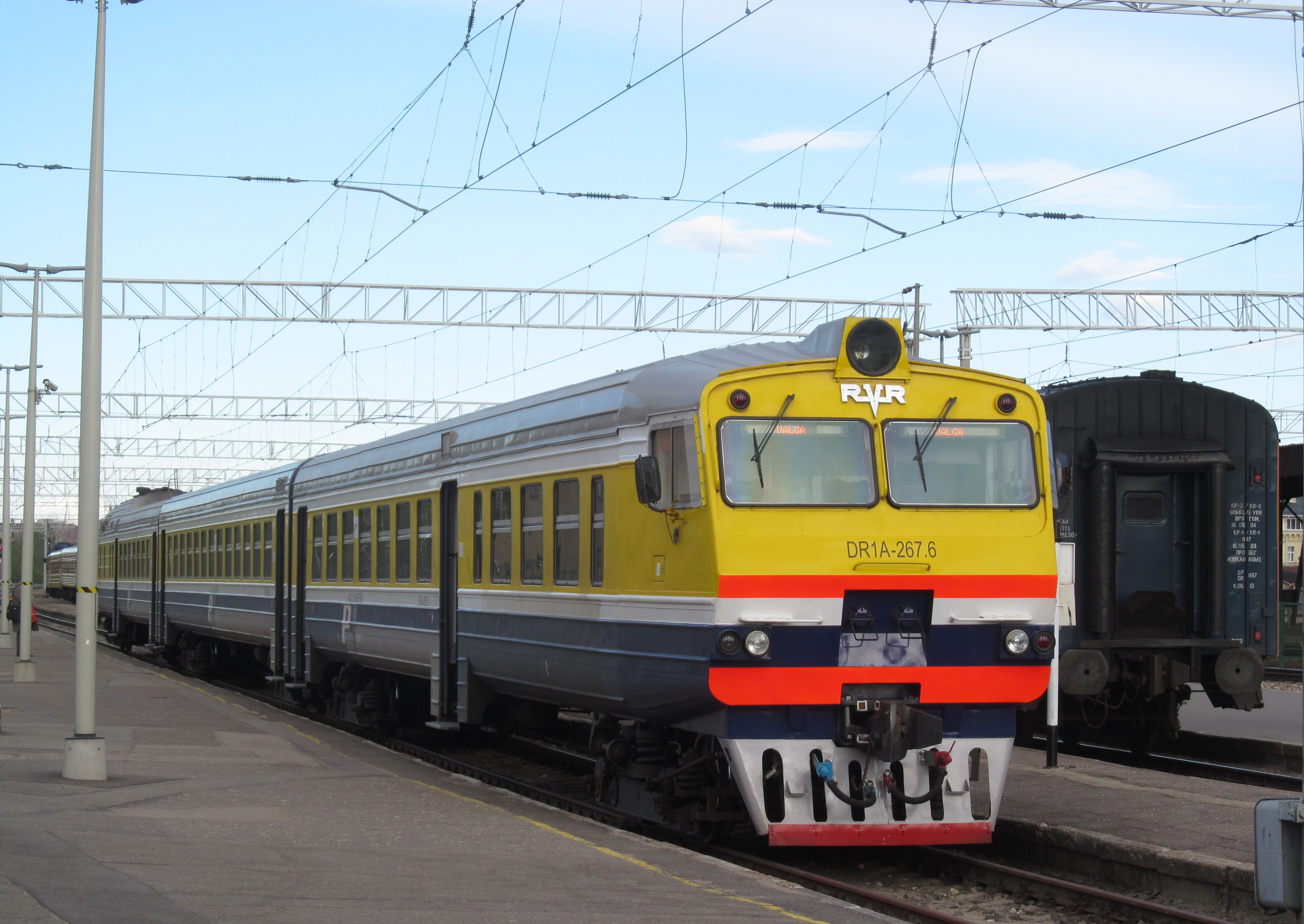
A train built in RVR

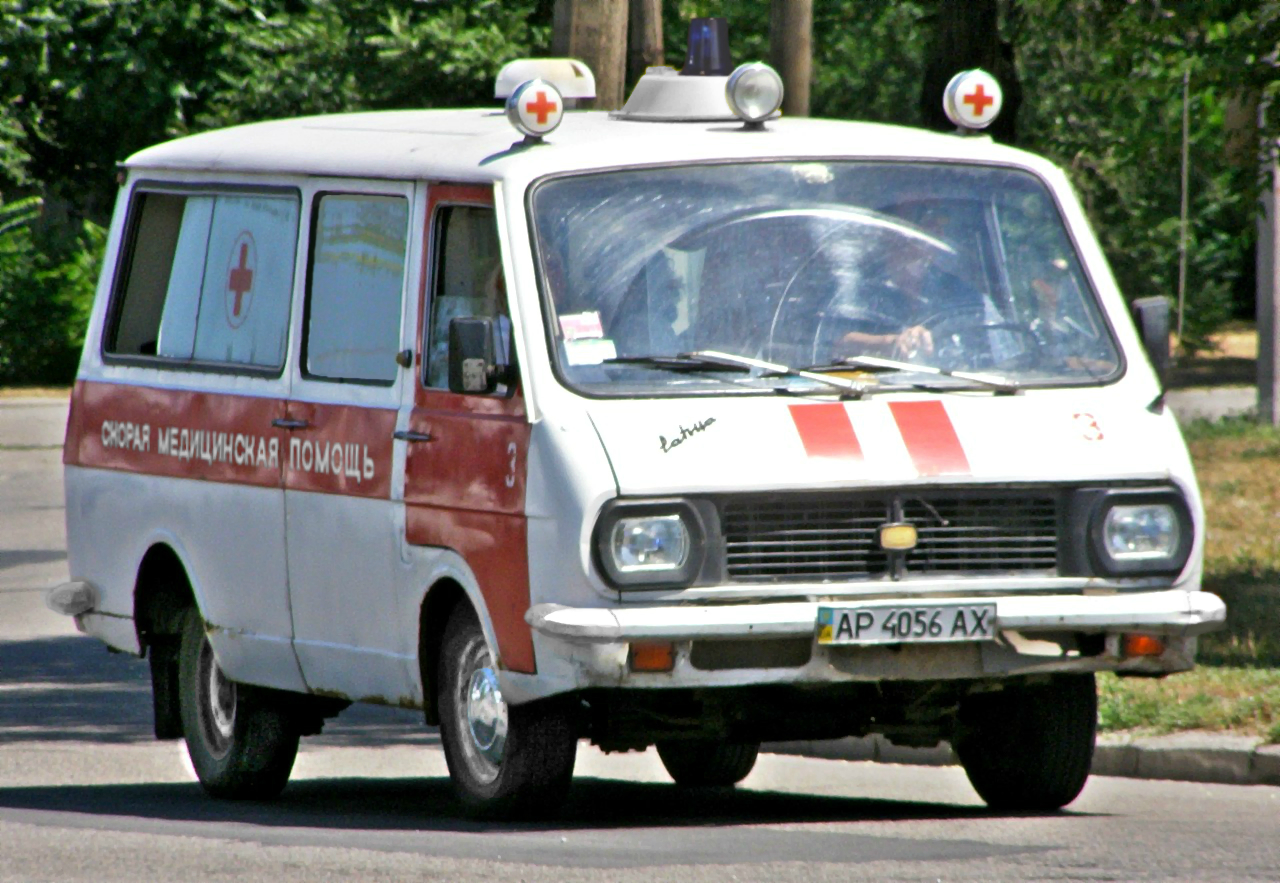
The iconic RAF minibus

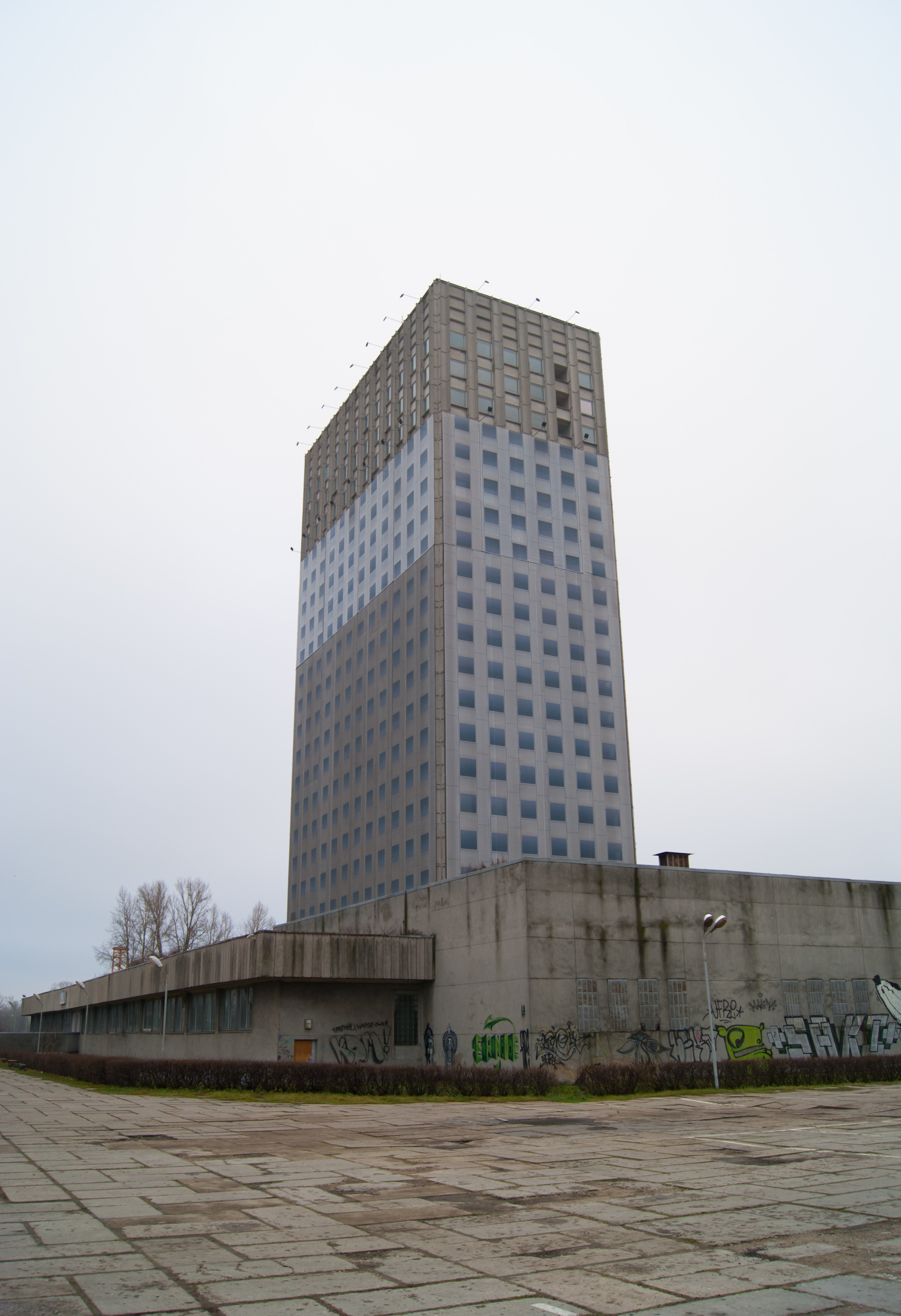
The abandoned House of Press

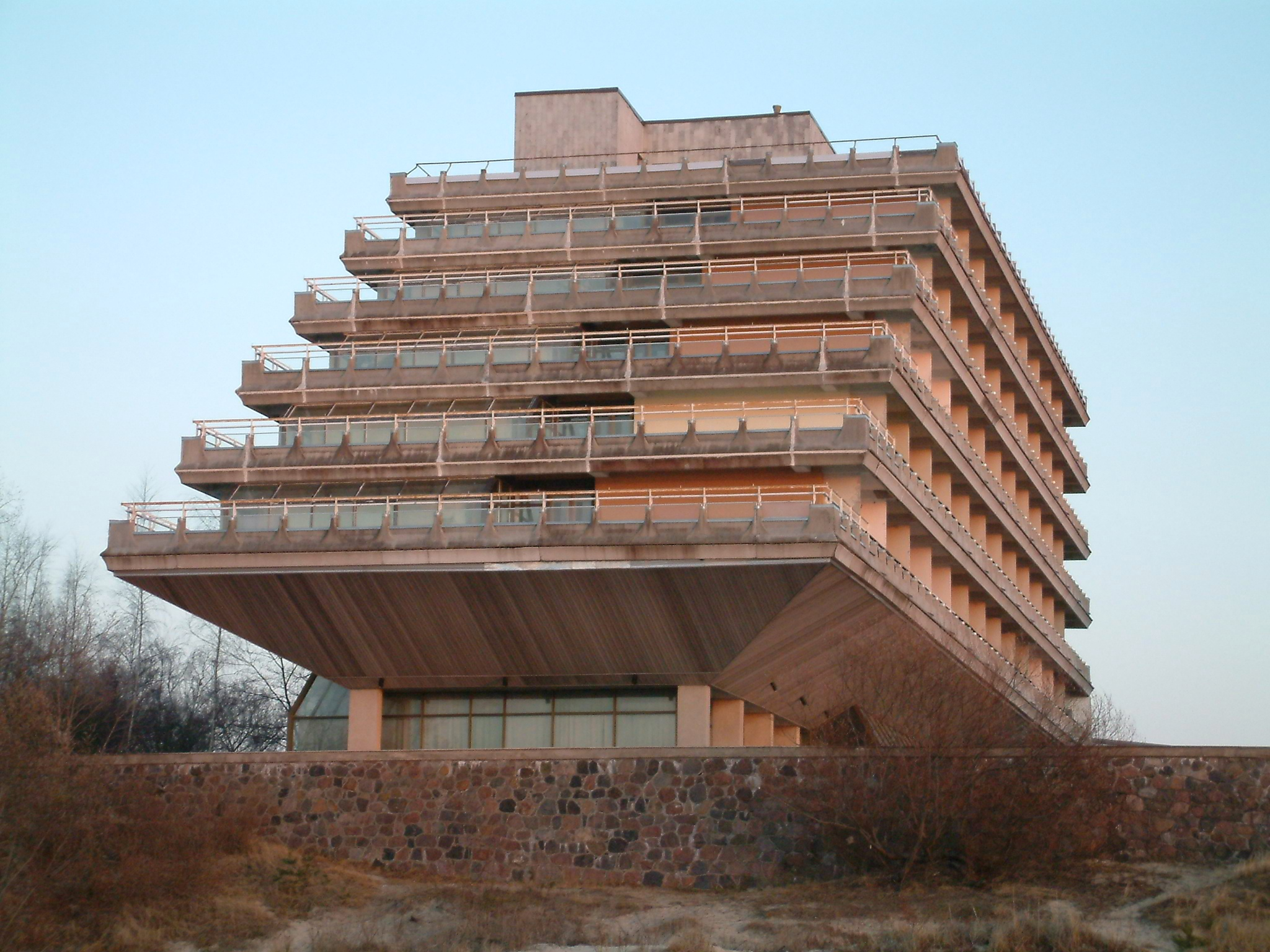
Soviet nomenklatura sanatorium in Jūrmala

Since there were not enough people to operate the newly built factories and expand industrial production, workers outside the Latvian SSR (mainly Russians) were transferred into the country, noticeably decreasing the proportion of ethnic Latvians. The speed of Russification was also influenced by the fact that Riga was the HQ of the Baltic Military District, with active and retired Soviet officers moving there.

Increased investments and subsidies for collective farms greatly increased the living standards of the rural population without much increase in production output. Much of the farm produce was still grown on small private plots. To improve rural living standards, a mass campaign was started to liquidate individual family farms and to move people into smaller agricultural towns where they were given apartments. Farmers became paid workers in collective farms.

While the early Voss era continued with the modernizing impulse of the 1960s, a visible stagnation began by the mid-1970s. Prestige high-rise projects in Riga, such as the Hotel Latvija and the Ministry of Agriculture building, took many years to complete. A new international airport and the Vanšu Bridge over Daugava were built.

An ideological model of "live and let live" came into place. The black market, absenteeism, and alcoholism became widespread. Consumer goods shortages became normal.

== Era of Pugo, 1984–1988 ==
=== National reawakening, 1985–1990 ===
In the second half of the 1980s, Soviet leader Mikhail Gorbachev began the introduction of the political and economic reforms of glasnost and Perestroika. In the summer of 1987, large demonstrations were held in Riga at the Freedom Monument. In the summer of 1988, a national movement coalesced in the Popular Front of Latvia. The Latvian SSR, along with the other Baltic Republics, was allowed greater autonomy, and in 1988 the old national flag of Latvia was legalized, replacing the Soviet Latvian flag as the official flag in 1990. Pro-independence Latvian Popular Front candidates gained a two-thirds majority in the Supreme Council in the March 1990 democratic elections.

== Collapse of the Soviet rule ==
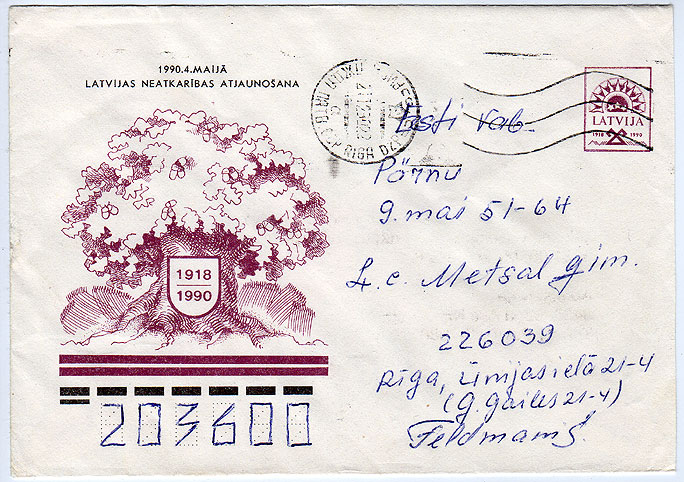
Latvian stationery issued to commemorate the restoration of independence of the Republic of Latvia: a 5-kopeck envelope without face value

Flag of the Republic of Latvia (since 1990)

On 4 May 1990, the Council passed the declaration "On the Restoration of Independence of the Republic of Latvia," which declared the Soviet annexation void and announced the start of a transitional period to independence. It argued that the 1940 occupation violated international law. It also argued that the 1940 resolution acceding to the Soviet Union was illegal since the 1922 Latvian constitution stipulated that any major change in the state order had to be submitted to a referendum. In any case, the declaration argued that the 1940 elections were conducted based on an illegal and unconstitutional election law, which rendered all actions of the "People's Saeima" ipso facto void. On these bases, the Supreme Council argued that the Republic of Latvia, as proclaimed in 1918, still legally existed even though its sovereignty had been de facto lost in 1940.

Latvia took the position that it did not need to follow the process of secession delineated in the Soviet constitution, arguing that since the annexation was illegal and unconstitutional, it was merely reasserting independence that still existed under international law. However, the central power in Moscow continued to regard Latvia as a Soviet republic from 1990 to 1991. In January 1991, Soviet political and military forces unsuccessfully tried to overthrow the Republic of Latvia authorities by occupying the central publishing house in Riga and establishing a Committee of National Salvation to usurp governmental functions. During the transitional period, Moscow maintained many central Soviet state authorities in Latvia. Despite this, seventy-three percent of all Latvian residents confirmed their strong support for independence on 3 March 1991 in a non-binding advisory referendum. A large number of ethnic Russians also voted for the proposition. The Republic of Latvia declared the end of the transitional period and restored complete independence on 21 August 1991 in the aftermath of the failed Soviet coup attempt. Latvia, as well as Lithuania and Estonia de facto ceased to be parts of the USSR four months before the Soviet Union itself ceased to exist (26 December 1991). Soon, on 6 September, the USSR recognized the independence of the three Baltic states. Today, the Republic of Latvia and other Baltic states consider themselves to be the legal continuation of the sovereign states whose first independent existence dates back to 1918–1940 and does not accept any legal connection with the former Latvian SSR, which had been occupied and annexed into USSR 1940–1941 and 1944–1991. Since independence, the Communist Party of the Latvian SSR was discontinued, and several high-ranking Latvian SSR officials faced prosecution for their role in various human rights abuses during the Latvian SSR regime. Latvia later joined NATO and the European Union in 2004.

== Economy ==
The Soviet period saw rebuilding and increase of the industrial capacity, including the automobile (RAF) and electrotechnic (VEF) factories, food processing industry, oil pipelines, and the bulk-oil port Ventspils.

Part of the incorporation of the Latvian SSR into the Soviet Union was the introduction of the Russian language into all spheres of public life. Russian became a prerequisite for admission to higher education and better job occupations. It was also made a compulsory subject in all Latvian schools. Vast numbers of people were needed for the new factories, and they were purposefully sent there from different parts of Russia, thus creating a situation wherein bigger towns became increasingly Russified until the 1980s.

National income per capita was higher in Latvia than elsewhere in the USSR (42% above the Soviet average in 1968); however, Latvia was at the same time a relative contributor to the Federation's center with an estimated 0.5% of the Latvian GDP going to Moscow. After the Soviet Union's collapse, all economic branches associated with it also collapsed. While a significant Russian presence in Latgale predated the Soviet Union (~30%), the intense industrialization and the heavy importation of labor from the Soviet Union to support it led to significant increases in the Russian minority in Riga, even forming a majority in Latvian urban centers such as Daugavpils, Rēzekne, and Ogre. Those areas were also hardest hit economically when the Soviet Union collapsed, leading to massive unemployment. Sharp disagreement with Russia over the legacy of the Soviet era has led to punitive economic measures by Russia, including the demise of transit trade as Russia cut off petroleum exports through Ventspils in 2003 (eliminating 99% of its shipments) after the government of Latvia refused to sell the oil port to the Russian state oil company, Transneft. The result is that only a fraction of Latvia's economy is connected with Russia, especially after it joined the European Union.

In 2016, a committee of historians and economists published a report, "Latvian Industry Before and After Restoration of Independence," estimating the overall cost of Soviet occupation in the years 1940–1990 at €185 billion, not counting the intangible costs of "deportations and imprisonment policy" of the Soviet authorities.

== Soviet army presence ==
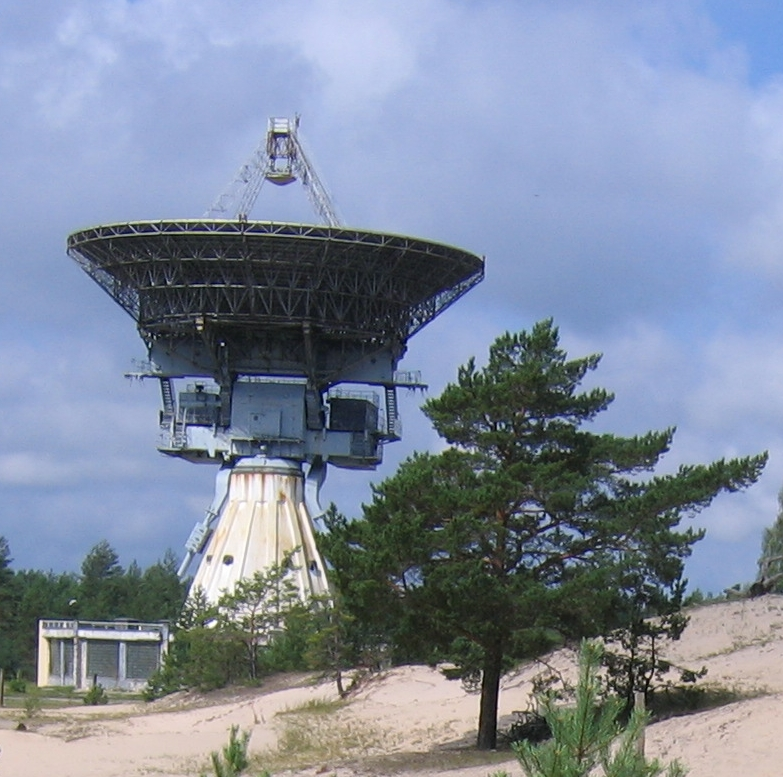
Irbene radio telescope

The Red Army had been stationed in Latvia since October 1939, when it demanded and received military bases in Courland where it stationed at least 25,000 soldiers with plane, tank and artillery support. The Soviet Navy received rights to use ports in Ventspils and Liepāja. In addition to soldiers, uncontrolled numbers of officers' family members and construction workers arrived.

During the first year of Soviet power, construction of the new military aerodromes was begun, often involving the local population as unpaid construction workers. The Soviet Navy took over seaports and shipping yards. Many hundreds of Soviet officers were moved into newly nationalized apartments and houses. Larger apartments were subdivided, creating communal ones.

After 1944, Latvia and Riga became heavily militarized. demobilized soldiers and officers chose to move to Riga, creating severe housing shortages. Much of the new apartment building in the first post-war years was done only for the benefit of Soviet officers stationed in Riga.

Courland's entire Baltic Sea coast became a Soviet border area with limited freedom of movement for the local inhabitants and closed to outsiders. Beaches were illuminated by searchlights and plowed to show any footprints. The old fishing villages became closed military zones, and fishermen were moved to larger townships: Roja, Kolka. The small coastal nation of Livonians virtually ceased to exist. Secretive objects were built like the Irbene radio telescope. Liepāja port was littered with rusting submarines and beaches with unexploded phosphorus.

By the mid-1980s, in addition to 350,000 soldiers of the Baltic Military District, an unknown number of border and interior ministry troops were stationed in the Baltics. In 1994 the departing Russian troops presented a list of over 3000 military units stationed in 700 sites taking over 120,000 ha, or about 2% of Latvian land.

In addition to active military personnel, Riga was popular as a retirement town for Soviet officers, who could not retire to larger cities like Moscow or Kyiv. Many thousands of them received preferential treatment in receiving new housing. To speed up the withdrawal of the Russian army, Latvia officially agreed to allow 20,000 retired Soviet officers and their families (up to 50,000 people) to remain in Latvia without granting them citizenship and Russia continues to pay them pensions.

Military training was provided by the Riga Higher Military Political School and the Riga Higher Military Aviation Engineering School.

== International status ==
The governments of the Baltic countries, the European Court of Human Rights, the United Nations Human Rights Council, the United States, and the European Union (EU), regard Latvia as being occupied by the Soviet Union in 1940 under the provisions of the 1939 Molotov–Ribbentrop Pact. The European Parliament in recognizing the occupation of the Baltic states from 1940 until the fall of the Soviet Union as illegal, led to the early acceptance of the Baltic states into the NATO alliance.

=== Soviet sources before Perestroika ===
Up to the reassessment of Soviet history in the USSR that began during Perestroika, before the USSR had condemned the 1939 secret protocol between Nazi Germany and itself that had led to the invasion and occupation of the three Baltic countries, the events in 1939 were as follows: The Government of the Soviet Union suggested that the Governments of the Baltic countries conclude mutual assistance treaties between the countries. Pressure from working people forced the governments of the Baltic countries to accept this suggestion. The Pacts of Mutual Assistance were then signed which allowed the USSR to station a limited number of Red Army units in the Baltic countries. Economic difficulties and dissatisfaction of the populace with the Baltic governments' policies that had sabotaged the fulfillment of the Pact and the Baltic countries' governments' political orientation toward Nazi Germany led to a revolutionary situation in June 1940. To guarantee the Pact's fulfillment, additional military units entered Baltic countries, welcomed by the workers who demanded the resignations of the Baltic governments. In June, under the leadership of the Communist Parties, political demonstrations by workers were held. The fascist governments were overthrown, and workers' governments were formed. In July 1940, elections for the Baltic Parliaments were held. The "Working People's Unions," created by an initiative of the Communist Parties, received the majority of the votes. The Parliaments adopted the declarations of the restoration of Soviet powers in Baltic countries and proclaimed the Soviet Socialist Republics. Declaration of Estonia's, Latvia's and Lithuania's wishes to join the USSR were adopted, and the Supreme Soviet of the USSR petitioned accordingly. The Supreme Soviet of the USSR approved the requests.

=== Current position of the Russian government ===
The Russian government and officials maintain that the Soviet annexation of the Baltic states was legitimate and that the Soviet Union liberated the countries from the Nazis.

== See also ==
- History of Latvia
- Republics of the Soviet Union
