= Arbeterheim =

Jewish organization based in Riga, Latvia

Arbeterheim (Yiddish: ארבעטערהיים, 'Workers Home') was a Jewish cultural association in Riga, Latvia 1920-1923. The association was set by communists in 1920. The association was registered on June 20, 1920. It functioned as a front organization of the Communist Party of Latvia. Arbeterheim was led by Ābrams Ravdins. At its locale on 15 Tērbatas street, Arbeterheim ran a "library, a reading room, language classes, a drama circle, and a music studio". In Riga the organization had some 3,000 members. Local groups were also formed in Daugavpils, Liepāja and Rēzekne.

In March 1922 the joint list of the leftist trade unions, the workers consumer cooperative "Produkts" and Arbeterheim gathered 16,672 votes (14%) in the election to the Riga city council.

In April 1922 Vladimir Mayakovsky performed at Arbeterheim in Riga. Subsequently Arbeterheim printed 10,000 copies of Mayakovsky's poem I Love, but the copies were seized by police.

The association was banned in 1922, deemed to be a communist front organization. Arbeterheim continued to function clandestinely. Kultur-Lige ('Culture League') was set up as a successor organization of Arbeterheim.
