= Augusts Kirhenšteins =

Prime Minister of Latvia

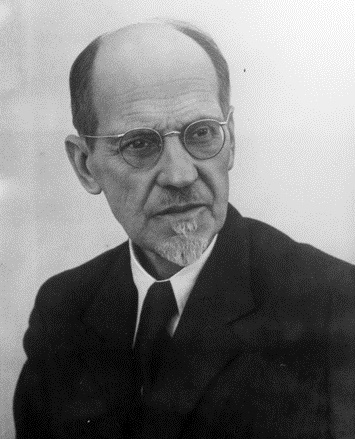
- Kirhenšteins in 1942

President of Latvia
- In office 21 July 1940 – 25 August 1940
- Preceded by: Kārlis Ulmanis
- Succeeded by: Position abolished (de facto)

Prime Minister of Latvia
- In office 17 June 1940 – 25 August 1940
- President: Kārlis Ulmanis; Himself
- Preceded by: Kārlis Ulmanis
- Succeeded by: Position abolished (de facto)

Chairman of the Presidium of the Supreme Soviet of the LSSR
- In office 25 August 1940 – 10 March 1952
- Preceded by: Position established
- Succeeded by: Kārlis Ozoliņš

Personal details
- Born: 18 September 1872 Mazsalaca, Governorate of Livonia, Russian Empire
- Died: 3 November 1963 (aged 91) Riga, then part of Latvian SSR, Soviet Union
- Party: CPSU
- Other political affiliations: Communist Party of Latvia
- Spouse: Olga Kirhenšteine
- Education: Tartu Veterinary Institute
- Profession: Microbiologist
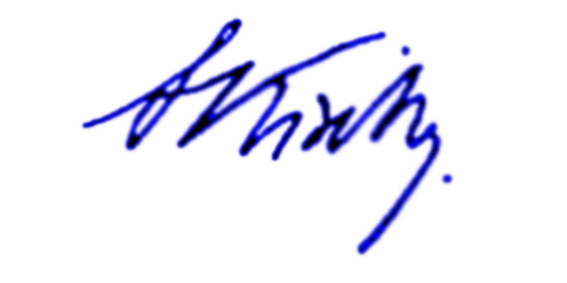
- Signature

Augusts Kirhenšteins, formerly spelt Kirchenšteins (18 September 1872 – 3 November 1963), was a Latvian and Soviet microbiologist, politician and educator. He was the de facto prime minister of Latvia from 20 June 1940 to 25 August 1940 and Acting de facto President of Latvia from 21 July 1940 to 25 August 1940. It was Kirhenšteins' Soviet puppet government that requested the incorporation of Latvia into the Soviet Union after the occupation of the country in 1940. He became a member of the Communist Party in 1941. He was Chairman of the Presidium of the Supreme Soviet of the Latvian Soviet Socialist Republic 1940–1952.

== Biography ==
Augusts Kirhenšteins was born on 18 September 1872 on the estate of Valtenberg Manor in Mazsalaca, in the Governorate of Livonia. He was the eldest son of the tenant Mārtiņš Kirhenšteins and his wife Baba, in a family of eleven children. Augusts Kirhenšteins' younger brother, Rūdolfs Kirhenšteins (1891–1938), went on to become a Soviet intelligence officer who was arrested and shot during the Great Terror.

In 1888, Augusts Kirhenšteins attended school at the Riga Alexander Boys Gymnasium. He then studied at the Tartu Veterinary Institute (1893-1901), publishing his first scientific work while still pursuing his studies. He joined the student fraternity Selonija, later switching to the fraternity Zemgalija. In 1901, he graduated from the institute and worked as a veterinarian in Valmiera and Limbaži. Kirhenšteins was involved in revolutionary anti-Tsarist activity in this period and after the 1905 revolution was defeated in Latvia, Kirhenšteins emigrated to Switzerland, where he lived for a while in Zürich. In 1911, he began work in Davos at the Institute for Tuberculosis Research as an assistant to the bacteriologist Carl Spengler.

During World War I, Kirhenšteins served in the Serbian army as a military veterinarian. He returned home to Latvia in 1917, later becoming a captain in veterinary units of the Latvian National Armed Forces during the Latvian War of Independence.

In 1919, he was elected as an associate professor at the University of Latvia, where he established a Microbiology Institute in the Faculty of Agriculture. In 1923, he defended his doctoral thesis, "On the Internal Structure and Development of Bacteria", writing his dissertation in French—this was the first doctoral thesis defended in Latvia. In 1923, he established a serological laboratory (Serum Station) at the University of Latvia. Working as its director, he made a major contribution to the development of science in Latvia, especially in the fields of microbiology, immunology, dairy farming and biotechnology.

In 1934, he married Olga Jansone in Bern. In addition to his scientific activities, Kirhenšteins was involved in social and political matters, in which he was a supporter of social democracy. After the occupation of Latvia, Kirhenšteins was invited to the USSR Embassy and offered to become the head of the new Soviet puppet government in Latvia, whose primary task was to formally ask for Latvia to be admitted to the Soviet Union, which was finalized in August 1940. He was then made chairman of the Presidium of the Latvian Soviet Socialist Republic (1940–52), and vice-president of the Latvian Academy of Sciences (1951-1958).

He died on 3 November 1963 in Riga and was buried at the Rainis Cemetery.

== Awards ==
- Hero of Socialist Labour – by the Decree of the Presidium of the Supreme Soviet of the Soviet dated September 17, 1957 "for outstanding services in the field of biological science and social and political activity"
- 6 Orders of Lenin
- Order of the Patriotic War, 1st degree (03/02/1944)
- 3 Orders of the Red Banner of Labour
- Honored Scientist of the Latvian SSR (1945)

Political offices
Preceded by Kārlis Ulmanis	Prime Minister of Latvia; 1940	Succeeded by Position abolished
