= Latvian Social Democratic Party =

Latvian political party

Latvian Social Democratic Party Latvijas Sociāldemokrātiskā partija
- Abbreviation: LSDP
- Leader: Juris Bojars
- Founded: 14 April 1990
- Dissolved: May 1999
- Split from: LKP
- Merged into: LSDSP
- Ideology: Social democracy Reformism
- Political position: Center-left

The Latvian Social Democratic Party (Latvian: Latvijas Sociāldemokrātiskā partija, LSDP) was a political party in Latvia formed by a reformist wing of the Communist Party of Latvia.

On 14 April 1990, a pro-independence faction under Ivars Ķezbers split off from the LKP to form the Independent Communist Party of Latvia (Latvian: Latvijas Neatkarīgā Komunistiskā partija, LNKP). The main body of the LKP, under the leadership of Alfrēds Rubiks, remained loyal to the CPSU. Later that same year, on 14 September, the party was officially renamed the Democratic Labour Party of Latvia (Latvian: Latvijas Demokrātiskā darba partija, LDDP). In 1995 it changed its name to LSDP. Originally a political party with communist and nationalist leanings, it was transformed into a social democratic organization by the party leader Juris Bojars.

The party co-operated with the Latvian Social Democratic Workers' Party in the 1995 elections, in the 1997 local government elections, and again in the 1998 elections. In May 1999 it merged into the Latvian Social Democratic Workers' Party.
