= Padomju Latvijas Komunists =

Political magazine in Latvia (1945–1990)

- Categories: Political magazine
- Frequency: Monthly
- Founded: 1945
- Final issue: 1990
- Country: Latvia
- Based in: Riga
- Language: Latvian
- ISSN: 0132-6430
- OCLC: 77222629

Padomju Latvijas Komunists ('Communist of Soviet Latvia') was a Latvian language monthly journal published from Riga, the theoretical organ of the Central Committee of the Communist Party of Latvia. It had a Russian language edition, called Kommunist Sovetskoi Latvii.

The publication was founded in 1945, and called Padomju Latvijas Boļševiks (Latvian: Bolshevik of Soviet Latvia) until 1952. In the early years Jānis Bumbiers was the editor of the journal. It had several supplements, including the handicrafts attachments.

As of the early 1970s, Padomju Latvijas Komunists had a circulation of 16,300, and Kommunist Sovetskoi Latvii had a circulation of 5,100. It ceased publication in 1990.
