= List of chairmen of the Presidium of the Supreme Soviet of the Latvian Soviet Socialist Republic =

The chairman of the Presidium of the Supreme Soviet of the Latvian Soviet Socialist Republic was the highest official in the Latvian Soviet Socialist Republic, which was in turn a part of the Soviet Union.

Below is a list of office-holders:

Name	Entered office	Left office
Augusts Kirhenšteins (1872–1963)	August 25, 1940	April 11, 1952
Kārlis Ozoliņš (1905–1987)	April 11, 1952	November 27, 1959
Jānis Kalnbērziņš (1893–1986)	November 27, 1959	May 5, 1970
Vitālijs Rubenis (1914–1994)	May 5, 1970	August 20, 1974
Pēteris Strautmanis (1919–2007)	August 20, 1974	June 22, 1985
Jānis Vagris (1930–2023)	June 22, 1985	October 6, 1988
Anatolijs Gorbunovs (born 1942)	October 6, 1988	May 3, 1990

== See also ==
- President of Latvia

== Sources ==
- World Statesmen – Latvian Soviet Socialist Republic
