= Jānis Kalnbērziņš =

Latvian Communist politician

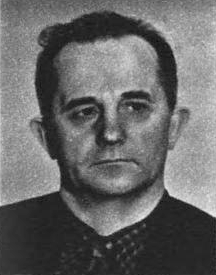

First Secretary of the Communist Party of Latvia
- In office 21 June 1940 – 25 November 1959
- Preceded by: Office established
- Succeeded by: Arvīds Pelše

Chairman of the Presidium of the Supreme Soviet of the Latvian SSR
- In office 27 November 1959 – 5 May 1970
- Preceded by: Kārlis Ozoliņš
- Succeeded by: Vitālijs Rubenis

Personal details
- Born: 17 September 1893 Rīgas apriņķis, Governorate of Livonia, Russian Empire
- Died: 4 February 1986 (aged 92) Riga, then part of Latvian SSR, Soviet Union
- Party: Communist Party of the Soviet Union
- Other political affiliations: Communist Party of Latvia
- Education: Communist University of the National Minorities of the West

Jānis Kalnbērziņš (17 September 1893 – 4 February 1986) was a Latvian Soviet politician and statesman who was the first secretary of the Communist Party of Latvia and the first de facto leader of the Latvian Soviet Socialist Republic.

== Biography ==
Born into a working-class family in Katlakalns Parish (now Ķekava Municipality) in the Governorate of Livonia, Kalnbērziņš joined the Bolshevik Party in April 1917. After the defeat of the Latvian Socialist Soviet Republic, he enlisted in the ranks of the Red Latvian Riflemen and fought against the white forces during the Russian Civil War in the Southern Front.

From 1925 he was active in the underground Communist movement of Latvia but returned to the RSFSR in 1928. He graduated from the Communist University of the National Minorities of the West in 1931 and from the Institute of Red Professors in 1933.

Kalnbērziņš continued underground party work in Latvia. His wife was arrested in 1937 during the Great Purge and his children were sent to an orphanage. He himself was arrested by Latvian authorities in 1939 and was sentenced to a long prison term.

After the Soviet troops entered Latvia in 1940 he was released from custody and was appointed the First Secretary of the Communist Party of Latvia (CPL) from 1940 to 1949 and at the same time the secretary of the Riga Committee of the CPL. During World War II he was a member of the Military Council of the North-Western Front.

He was a member of the Central Committee of the Communist Party of the Soviet Union from 1952 to 1971 and a candidate member of the Politburo of the CPSU from 1957 to 1962. He was a deputy of the Supreme Soviet of the USSR of 1-7th convocations, member of the Presidium of the Supreme Soviet from 1950 to 1954.

After the defeat of the National Communist faction of the CPL in 1959 he was removed from his position of first secretary in May 1959. In November 1959 he was appointed Chairman of the Presidium of the Supreme Soviet of the Latvian Soviet Socialist Republic.

Kalnbērziņš was retired in 1970 by the decision of the Council of Ministers of the USSR and received a personal pension.

He died in 1986 aged 92 and was buried in the Rainis Cemetery in Riga.
