= Boris Pugo =

Soviet Latvian politician (1937–1991)

- Борис Пуго
- Pugo in 1989

Minister of Interior of the Soviet Union
- In office 1 December 1990 – 22 August 1991
- President: Mikhail Gorbachev; Gennady Yanayev (disputed)
- Premier: Nikolai Ryzhkov; Valentin Pavlov
- Preceded by: Vadim Bakatin
- Succeeded by: Vasily P. Trushin

Chairman of the Central Control Commission
- In office 14 July 1990 – 23 April 1991
- Preceded by: Himself
- Succeeded by: Evgeny Makhovl

Chairman of the Party Control Committee of the Central Committee
- In office 30 September 1988 – 11 July 1990
- Preceded by: Mikhail Solomentsev
- Succeeded by: Office Abolished

First Secretary of the Communist Party of Latvia
- In office 14 April 1984 – 4 October 1989
- Preceded by: Augusts Voss
- Succeeded by: Jānis Vagris

Candidate for membership in the Politburo of the CPSU Central Committee
- In office September 20, 1989 – July 13, 1990

Chairman of the KGB of the Latvian SSR
- In office November 1980 – April 1984
- Preceded by: Longin Avdyukevich
- Succeeded by: Stanislav Zukul

Personal details
- Born: 19 February 1937 Kalinin, Russian SFSR, Soviet Union
- Died: 22 August 1991 (aged 54) Moscow, Russian SFSR, Soviet Union
- Cause of death: Suicide by gunshot
- Resting place: Troyekurovskoye Cemetery
- Citizenship: Soviet Union
- Party: Communist Party of the Soviet Union (1960–1991)
- Spouse: Valentina Pugo
- Children: Vadim Pugo

Military service
- Allegiance: Soviet Union
- Branch/service: KGB
- Years of service: 1976–1991
- Rank: Colonel general
- Battles/wars: 1991 Soviet coup attempt

Boris Karlovich Pugo (Latvian: Boriss Pugo, Russian: Борис Карлович Пуго, 19 February 1937 – 22 August 1991) was a Soviet communist politician of Latvian origin. After a career in the Komsomol, the Communist Party and the KGB in Latvia, he was first secretary of the Communist Party of Latvia from 1984 to 1988, and he then moved to Moscow as chairman of the party's Control Committee. As Soviet interior minister from December 1990, he was a member of the State Committee on the State of Emergency during the August 1991 coup attempt, and he shot himself in his Moscow flat after the coup failed.

== Early life and education ==
Pugo was born on 19 February 1937 in Kalinin, now Tver, into a family of active Latvian communists. His parents were Kārlis Pugo and Marta Peizuma, who had left Latvia after Latvia was proclaimed an independent country in 1918, and the Communist side was defeated in the war that followed. After the Soviet annexation of Latvia in 1940, his father held a relatively high position in the nomenklatura of the Latvian SSR.

Pugo studied at the Latvian State University from 1955 to 1958, and at the Riga Polytechnic Institute from 1958 to 1960, where he qualified as a mechanical engineer. The historian Daina Bleiere writes that his Latvian was weak, and that he understood the language but did not speak it.

== Komsomol and party career ==
In October 1961, Pugo became second secretary of the Komsomol committee of Riga's Proletarian district, and in 1962 its first secretary. He joined the Communist Party of the Soviet Union in June 1963, and in November that year he moved to Moscow to work in the Central Committee of the All-Union Komsomol. He returned to Riga in February 1968, became first secretary of the Central Committee of the Latvian Komsomol in April 1969, and in June 1970 was made a secretary of the All-Union Komsomol Central Committee in Moscow.

In April 1974, Pugo became an inspector of the Central Committee of the Communist Party of the Soviet Union, and in November 1974 he was appointed head of the party organisational work department of the Central Committee of the Communist Party of Latvia. From July 1975, he was first secretary of the party's Riga city committee.

== KGB ==
In October 1976, Pugo moved to the KGB as head of an inspection department of the USSR KGB, and from October 1976 to May 1977 he took the KGB's special course at its Higher School. In June 1977, he became first deputy chairman of the KGB of the Latvian SSR, and he was its chairman from November 1980 to April 1984. According to Bleiere, he held the KGB rank of major general.

== First Secretary of the Communist Party of Latvia ==
On 14 April 1984, Pugo succeeded Augusts Voss as first secretary of the Central Committee of the Communist Party of Latvia. He was also a member of the Latvian party's Politburo, and from January 1986 a member of the Central Committee of the Communist Party of the Soviet Union. Bleiere describes his rapid rise as atypical for a Latvian party official, and attributes it partly to his background and his father's standing. She writes that Mikhail Gorbachev regarded him as a useful ally, but that his popularity in Latvia declined because he failed to meet Latvian demands and could not speak Latvian well.

On 4 October 1988, Pugo was replaced as first secretary by Jānis Vagris. On 30 September 1988, he had been appointed chairman of the Party Control Committee of the Central Committee of the Communist Party of the Soviet Union, which was renamed the Central Control Commission in July 1990. He was a candidate member of the Politburo from 20 September 1989 to 13 July 1990.

== Minister of Internal Affairs ==
On 1 December 1990, Pugo was appointed Minister of Internal Affairs of the Soviet Union, replacing Vadim Bakatin. Hard-liners in the Soviet parliament welcomed the change, while liberals described the appointment of a former Latvian KGB chief as dangerous, and Galina Starovoitova said that moderates were "frightened by Pugo's appointment". In March 1991, he also became a member of the Security Council of the Soviet Union.

Pugo and the defence minister, Dmitry Yazov, secretly drafted an order on 29 December 1990 for joint army and police patrols in Soviet cities, which they said was intended to combat a sharp rise in violent crime. After protests, Pugo said that the patrols were aimed at "hooliganism and other criminal offenses" and not at rallies, and that each republic could decide whether the army would join its police. The Baltic republics, Georgia, Armenia and Moldavia promptly rejected the offer.

The Interior Ministry's special police units, the OMON, led the Kremlin's pressure on Latvia in January 1991, and The Christian Science Monitor reported that the Riga OMON regiment was directly responsible to Pugo. Bleiere writes that he secretly supported the OMON units in Riga and Vilnius, while publicly keeping a conciliatory line towards the Baltic republics' governments. The political scientist John B. Dunlop wrote that Pugo insistently disclaimed any knowledge of the actions of the "Black Berets", and that Gorbachev, Pugo and Yazov claimed that the killings in Vilnius on 13 January had resulted from a personal decision by the local garrison commander, which Dunlop called "manifestly untrue". A draft resolution backed by Boris Yeltsin in the Russian Supreme Soviet, which failed to pass, singled out Pugo and the KGB chairman Vladimir Kryuchkov for censure over the Vilnius events.

== August 1991 coup attempt ==
Pugo was a member of the State Committee on the State of Emergency, which tried to seize power in August 1991. Bleiere writes that he joined the conspiracy only at the last moment, which she attributes to the KGB's distrust of the Interior Ministry. According to the indictment in the coup case, published by Novaya Gazeta in 2021, Pugo held a meeting of the ministry's leadership on 19 August and ordered unconditional compliance with the committee's decisions, and he signed ministry orders and telegrams in support of the coup. The indictment states that he took part in the committee's session on 20 August, at which a draft resolution annulling the decrees of the Russian president was prepared under his direction.

== Death ==
On the evening of 21 August 1991, Pugo's son Vadim, who lived in a separate flat in the same building, visited his father. Vadim later said that he saw his father hide a sheet of paper on his desk, which he believes was a suicide note, and that his father later came to his flat, said "It's all over!", and had a small drink of vodka with him.

On the morning of 22 August, Viktor Ivanenko, the chairman of the KGB of the Russian SFSR, telephoned Pugo, who agreed to wait for him. When Ivanenko arrived with a group that included Viktor Yerin, the first deputy interior minister of the Russian SFSR, and the economist Grigory Yavlinsky, the door was opened by Pugo's elderly father-in-law. Pugo and his wife, Valentina, were found with gunshot wounds to the head, and Pugo died shortly afterwards. According to the indictment, he took his own life at about 9 a.m., knowing that the conspiracy had failed and that he faced prosecution.

In his suicide note, Pugo wrote that he had made "a completely unexpected mistake, equivalent to a crime", and he also wrote that he had been deceived by people he trusted. His wife left a note that read: "My dears! I can no longer live. Do not condemn us. Look after your grandfather. Mum." Valentina Pugo died in hospital without regaining consciousness, and her death was announced in early September 1991.

Early reports said that Pugo had shot his wife and then himself. The deputy Russian prosecutor Yevgeny Lisov later said that both had left suicide notes, and that Valentina had taken the pistol and shot herself after her husband had done so, dismissing speculation that either had been murdered. Novaya Gazeta Europe noted in 2025 that the official account left questions unanswered, such as why the pistol was lying on a bedside table, and that Vadim Pugo later said his 90-year-old grandfather had taken the gun from his father's hand. According to Bleiere, Vadim has denied in interviews the speculation that his parents were shot.

Pugo is buried at the Troyekurovskoye Cemetery in Moscow, together with his wife and her parents. The criminal case against him over the coup was closed because of his death.

== Personal life ==
In 1961, Pugo married Valentina Golubeva, who was born in Leningrad in 1938 and, like him, graduated from the Riga Polytechnic Institute in 1960. Their son, Vadim, was born in 1962.

== Honours ==
- Order of Lenin
- Order of the Red Banner of Labour
- Order of the Red Star
- Order of the Badge of Honour
