= Neatkarīgā Rīta Avīze =

Latvian newspaper

- Type: Daily newspaper
- Format: Compact (until 2020), digital (from 2020)
- Publisher: Mediju nams
- Editor-in-chief: Juris Paiders (from 2020)
- Language: Latvian, English (from 2020)
- Headquarters: Riga, Latvia
- Circulation: 25,000
- Website: www.nra.lv

Neatkarīgā Rīta Avīze (Independent Morning Newspaper) is a Latvian language national daily newspaper in Latvia, published in Riga. Since 5 May 2020, it is only published online, with the last print edition coming out on 30 April 2020.

The newspaper has been described as having close ties with oligarch Aivars Lembergs. Its political orientation has been characterised as nationalist.

== History ==
The forerunner of the newspaper was the party organ of the Latvian Social Democratic Workers' Party Cīņa (The Struggle) appearing since 1904. In 1919, Cīņa was taken over by the Communist Party of Latvia and remained the main party organ until 1990. With the restoration of Latvian independence in 1990, the newspaper's staff ceased collaborating with the party and formed Neatkarīgā Cīņa (The Independent Struggle) with new editors, which later become the Neatkarīgā Rīta Avīze.

In 2014, Neatkarīgā Rīta Avīze reported an exclusive that a 13th-century toilet ditch likely used by the Albert of Riga had been found during archaeological excavations in Old Riga. The story was picked up by many other Latvian news outlets, including the Public Broadcasting of Latvia, but later turned out to be a hoax.

Aivars Lembergs gained ownership of the paper in 1999, sometimes publishing his editorials there. In 2016, the publisher of Neatkarīgā Rīta Avīze was purchased by Nauris Kāpostiņš, a businessman and brother-in-law of Aivars Lembergs' son, Anrijs Lembergs.
