= Augusts Voss =

Latvian Soviet politician (1919–1994)

- Август Восс

Chairman of the Soviet of Nationalities
- In office 11 April 1984 – 25 May 1989
- Preceded by: Vitālijs Rubenis
- Succeeded by: Rafiq Nishonov

First Secretary of the Communist Party of Latvia
- In office 15 April 1966 – 14 April 1984
- Preceded by: Arvīds Pelše
- Succeeded by: Boris Pugo

Personal details
- Born: 30 October 1919 Omsk Governorate, Russian SFSR, Soviet Union
- Died: 10 February 1994 (aged 74) Moscow, Russian Federation
- Resting place: Troyekurovskoye Cemetery
- Citizenship: Soviet
- Party: Communist Party of the Soviet Union (1940–1990)
- Other political affiliations: Communist Party of Latvia

Augusts (Note: Also transliterated as August and Avgust.) Eduardovich Voss (Russian: Август Эдуардович Восс; 30 October 1919 – 10 February 1994) was a Soviet politician of Latvian origin and party functionary. Before World War II he worked as a school teacher. In 1940, he was mobilized into the Red Army and served as a politruk. From 1945, he served as a party apparatchik in Latvia. From 1966 till 1984, he was First Secretary of the Central Committee of the Communist Party of Latvia that is, the actual leader of the Latvian SSR and member of the Central Committee of the Communist Party of the Soviet Union from 1971 till 1990. From 1984 till 1989, he was Chairman of the Soviet of Nationalities, upper chamber of the Supreme Soviet of the Soviet Union.

== Early life and career ==
He was born on October 30, 1916 in Omsk Governorate, Russian SFSR. He was born to a farmer, Eduard Voss (1884–1973), and his wife, Maria Voss (1891–1989). He had a brother, Janis (1918–2012), and a sister. In 1933, he completed a three-month teacher training course and began working as a primary school teacher in the village of Znamenshchiki, and from 1935, as a mathematics teacher at Vikulovskaya Secondary School. After graduating from the Tyumen Teachers' Institute in 1939) he worked in a secondary school in the village of Armizon.

== World War II ==
From 1940, he was in the Red Army, graduated from the regimental school, and in February 1941, courses for political workers in Moscow. During this period, he joined the Communist Party of the Soviet Union. During World War II, he worked politically in the active army. He fought as a lieutenant in the anti-aircraft battery of the 329th anti-aircraft artillery regiment of the Moscow Air Defence District (with the rank of junior political instructor, then political instructor), from June 1942 - commissar of the artillery battalion in the 201st Latvian Rifle Division (later the 43rd Guards Rifle Division). On the Leningrad Front, he was a political instructor, twice wounded and shell-shocked. In January 1943, he was seriously wounded near Staraya Russa, treated in the 1081st evacuation hospital and was discharged on July 7, 1943. From 1943, he was director of the Vikulovskaya secondary school.

== Post-war ==
In 1945 he worked as an instructor in the school department of the Central Committee of the Communist Party of Latvia. In 1945–1948 he studied at the Higher Party School of the Central Committee of the CPSU. In 1949 he was the head of the science and higher education sector of the Central Committee of the Communist Party of Latvia, then the secretary of the party organization of the Pēteris Stučka Latvian State University. In 1950–1953 he studied in the graduate school of the Academy of Social Sciences under the Central Committee of the CPSU.

From 1953 to 1954, he was head of the Science and Culture Department, and from 1954 to 1960, head of the Party Organs Department of the Central Committee of the Communist Party of Latvia. From 1960 to 1966, he was Secretary of the Central Committee of the Communist Party of Latvia. He was a member of the Military Council of the Baltic Military District from 1960 to 1984.

From April 15, 1966 to April 14, 1984 – First Secretary of the Central Committee of the Communist Party of Latvia. From April 11, 1984 to May 25, 1989, he was the Chairman of the Soviet of Nationalities. He did not return to Latvia and died in Moscow in 1994, where he is also buried. He was buried at the Troyekurovskoye Cemetery in Moscow.

== Personal life ==
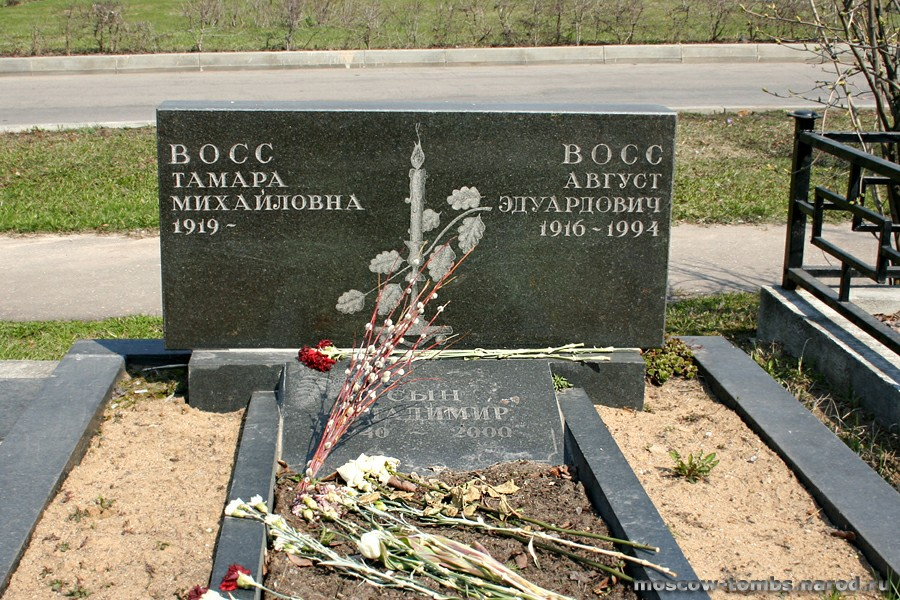
His grave.

Voss was married to Tamara Mikhailovna Voss (1919–2007). They had one son, Vladimir (1940–2000). His descendants live in Russia. He spoke Latvian, but did not speak it publicly.

== Awards ==
- 4 Orders of Lenin (October 29, 1966; August 27, 1971; October 29, 1976 ; October 29, 1986)
- Order of the October Revolution (December 12, 1973)
- 2 Orders of the Patriotic War, 1st class (June 16, 1976; March 11, 1985)
- 4 Orders of the Red Banner of Labor (20.07.1950; 15.02.1958; 1.10.1965; 2.04.1981)

== See also ==
- Arvīds Pelše
- Alfrēds Rubiks

== Notes ==
Party political offices
Preceded by Vitālijs Rubenis	Chairman of the Soviet of Nationalities; April 11, 1984 – May 25, 1989	Succeeded by Rafiq Nishonov
