= Jānis Vagris =

Latvian politician (1930–2023)

Chairman of the Presidium of the Supreme Soviet of the Latvian Soviet Socialist Republic
- In office 22 June 1985 – 6 October 1988
- Preceded by: Pēteris Strautmanis
- Succeeded by: Anatolijs Gorbunovs

First Secretary of the Central Committee of the Communist Party of Latvia
- In office 4 October 1988 – 7 April 1990
- Preceded by: Boris Pugo
- Succeeded by: Alfrēds Rubiks

Personal details
- Born: 17 October 1930 Naudīte Parish, Latvia
- Died: 6 January 2023 (aged 92)
- Party: Communist Party of the Soviet Union
- Other political affiliations: Communist Party of Latvia
- Education: University of Latvia
- Occupation: Politician, engineer

Jānis Vagris (17 October 1930 – 6 January 2023) was a Latvian politician. He served as the sixth Chairman of the Presidium of the Supreme Soviet of the Latvian Soviet Socialist Republic from 1985 to 1988, and as Secretary of the Central Committee of the Communist Party of Latvia from 1988 to 1990.

== Early life ==
Jānis Vagris was born on 17 October 1930 in Naudītes Parish, which is located in Latvia. He pursued his higher education at the University of Latvia, where he graduated from the Faculty of Mechanics. Additionally, Vagris attended the Higher Party School of the Central Committee of the Communist Party of the Soviet Union, completing his studies there in 1955. These educational experiences likely provided him with a solid foundation in mechanics and political ideology, which would later contribute to his career in politics.

== Career ==
Vagris then worked as an engineer at a factory in Jelgava. During this time, Vagris also served as the deputy chairman of the executive committee of the city. Vagris joined the Communist Party of the Soviet Union in 1958. From 1966 to 1973, Vagris was the first and second secretary of the Liepājā city committee, after which he joined the Communist Party of Latvia.

In 1978, Vagris was appointed as the first secretary of the Riga city committee. On 20 August 1985, he became the sixth chairman of the Presidium of the Supreme Soviet of the Latvian Soviet Socialist Republic. On 4 October 1988, Vagris was promoted to the First Secretary of the Central Committee of the Communist Party of Latvia. He made a speech at the Mežaparks Great Bandstand, three days before the Popular Front of Latvia's first congress. In 1989, Vagris was elected to the Congress of People's Deputies of the Soviet Union. On 7 April 1990, Vagris was succeeded by Alfrēds Rubiks as secretary. In later evaluations, Vagris' role during the revival was revealed to be ambiguous.

== Death ==
Vagris died on 6 January 2023, at the age of 92.

== Awards ==
- Order of the Three Stars and the role of Officer (2010)
- Orders of the October Revolution
- Red Banner of Labour.
- Meritorious Industrial Worker of the Latvian SSR.
