= Alfrēds Rubiks =

Latvian politician (born 1935)

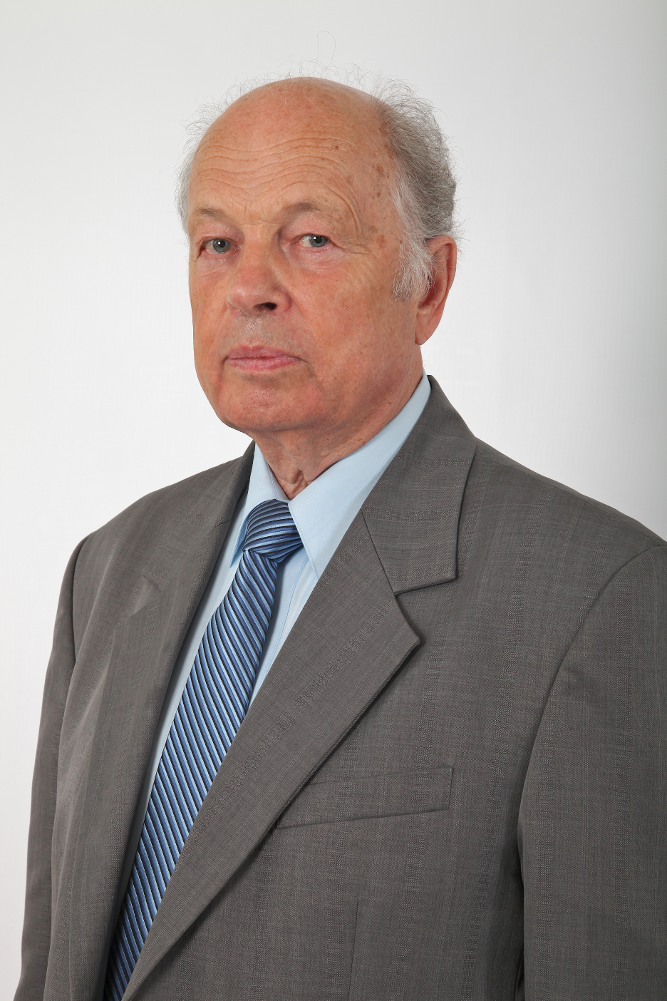
- Rubiks in 2014

Member of the European Parliament
- In office 2009–2014
- Constituency: Latvia

First Secretary of the Central Committee of the Communist Party of Latvia
- In office 7 April 1990 – 24 August 1991
- Preceded by: Jānis Vagris

Member of the 28th Politburo of the Communist Party of the Soviet Union
- In office 13 June 1990 – 6 November 1991

Chairman of the Riga City Executive Committee
- In office 1984–1990
- Preceded by: Mečislavs Dubra
- Succeeded by: Andrejs Inkulis

Personal details
- Born: 24 September 1935 (age 91) Daugavpils, Latvia
- Party: Communist Party of the Soviet Union (1958—1991); Socialist Party of Latvia (since 1999)
- Other political affiliations: European United Left/Nordic Green Left; Communist Party of Latvia (1968-1991)
- Children: Raimonds Rubiks; Artūrs Rubiks
- Parent: Pēteris Rubiks (father)
- Education: Riga Polytechnic Institute; Leningrad Higher Party School
- Profession: mechanical engineer

Alfrēds Rubiks (born 24 September 1935) is a Latvian communist politician and a former leader of the Communist Party of Latvia. He was a Member of the European Parliament for Latvia from 2009 until 2014. In the European Parliament he was a member of the European United Left–Nordic Green Left group.

Due to his former allegiance with the Communist Party of Latvia after January 1991, Rubiks is prohibited from running for an electable office in Latvia under Latvian law. His two sons Artūrs Rubiks and Raimonds Rubiks are also politicians and members of the Saeima for Harmony.

== Biography ==
Rubiks served as the Chairman of the Riga City Executive Committee from 1984 to 1990, effectively the last Communist mayor of the city. He was a member of the Politburo of the Communist Party of the Soviet Union from July 1990 until the party was banned on 6 November 1991. As head of the Communist Party of Latvia in 1991 he opposed Latvia's independence from the Soviet Union and issued a list of Latvian pro-independence politicians to be arrested but on 23 August 1991 was imprisoned himself for his role in attempting to overthrow the then new democratic government and supporting the August 1991 coup d'état attempt in Moscow. Despite his incarceration, Rubiks was nominated as a candidate in the 1996 Latvian presidential election by the Socialist Party, but lost to incumbent Guntis Ulmanis. Rubiks was released in November 1997 for good behaviour, and became chairman of the Socialist Party of Latvia, the de facto successor to the Communist Party, in 1999. In a 2000 poll, Rubiks was ranked the least popular politician in Latvia with a score of -22.4 points.

Rubiks was elected a Member of the European Parliament in the 2009 European Parliament elections as one of the two reprentatives of the political alliance Harmony Centre. In 2012, Rubiks distributed his biography "From Political Prisoner to European Parliament Member" to all EP members, drawing criticism from other MEPs from Latvia for the claims made in the book. In 2015, after the Socialist Party of Latvia lost in the 2014 European Parliament election, he resigned as its chairman. In 2019, along with Nils Ušakovs he was removed from the board of Harmony Centre.
