= Communist Party of Latvia =

Latvian political party

Communist Party of Latvia Latvijas Komunistiskā partija
- Founded: 7 June 1904
- Banned: 10 September 1991
- Succeeded by: Democratic Labour Party of Latvia; Socialist Party of Latvia
- Headquarters: Riga
- Newspaper: Cīņa
- Youth wing: LĻKJS
- Ideology: Communism; Marxism–Leninism
- Political position: Far-left
- National affiliation: Communist Party of the Soviet Union
- Colours: Red
- Supreme Council of the Republic of Latvia (1990): 55 / 201 (27%)

Party flag
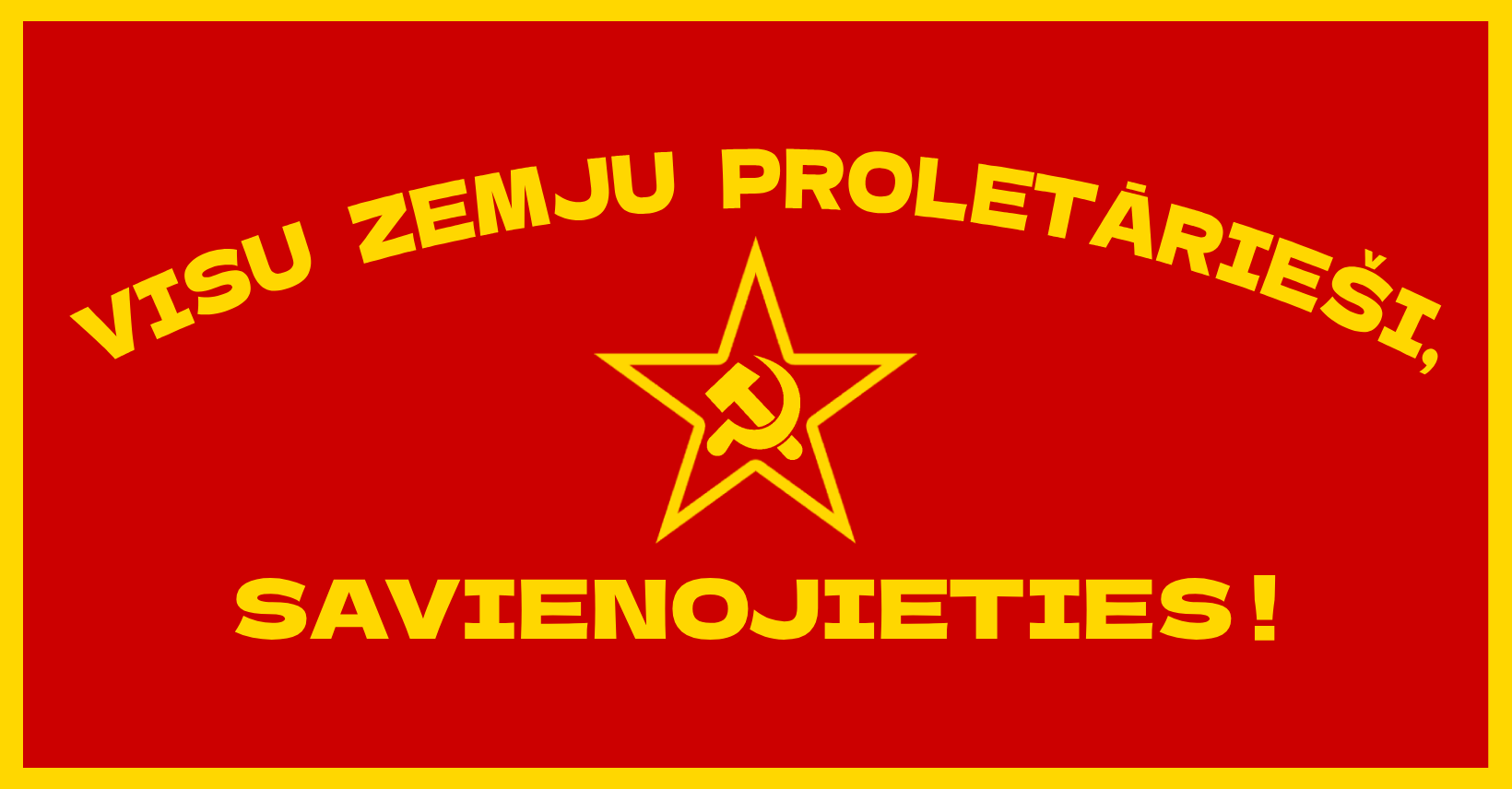

The Communist Party of Latvia (Latvian: Latvijas Komunistiskā partija, LKP) was a political party in Latvia.

== History ==
=== Latvian Social-Democracy prior to 1919 ===
The party was founded at a congress in June 1904. Initially the party was known as the Latvian Social Democratic Workers' Party (LSDSP). During its second party congress in 1905 it adopted the programme of the Russian Social Democratic Labour Party (RSDLP) as its own. At the Fourth Congress of the RSDLP in 1906, the LSDSP entered the RSDLP as a territorial organisation, and after the congress its name was changed to Social-Democracy of the Latvian Territory.

The party held its fourth congress in Brussels from 26 January to 8 February 1914.

In May 1918 Latvian Social Democratic Workers' Party was founded by the Menshevik elements who had been expelled from the LSD.

=== Rule in Soviet Latvia, 1919–1920 ===
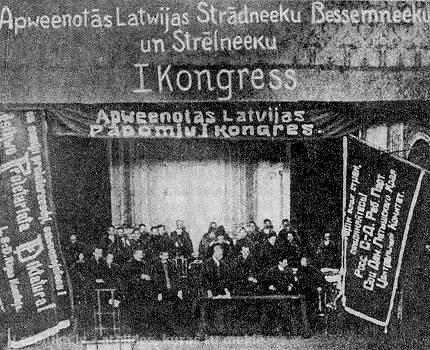
First Congress of the Communist Party of Latvia in 1919, slogans written in the Old Latvian orthography.

The party briefly governed the Latvian Socialist Soviet Republic in 1919; and changed its name to the Communist Party of Latvia in March 1919; 7,500 members in 1919. The youth wing of the party was the Young Communist League of Latvia (LKJS).

The LKP was a member of the Comintern (Third International) from 1919.

=== Underground and exile, 1920–1940 ===
In the aftermath of the Latvian War of Independence, the LKP was banned in Latvia. Its leadership resided in exile in the USSR, while the organisation in Latvia operated clandestinely, either through underground cells, or via proxy organisations, such as "Red" leftist trades unions.

In 1928 the party started operating more openly, and contested the 1928 Saeima elections through a proxy list known as the "Left Trade Unions". The list won five seats, but was banned in 1930. They reformed the following year to contest the next elections as the "Trade Union Workers and Peasants Group", winning six seats. However, in 1933 the Supreme Court ordered the dissolution of the party, and its MPs were arrested and charged with treason.

In 1936, a youth organization parallel to the LKJS, Workers' Youth League of Latvia (LDJS), was formed as a cooperative effort by the LKP and their former rivals, the erstwhile Menshevik Latvian Social Democratic Workers' Party, outlawed following the Ulmanis coup d'état in 1934.

=== In power in the Latvian SSR, 1940–1990 ===
1940 Latvian Communist Party poster

After the Soviet occupation of Latvia in June 1940 and the ousting of the Ulmanis government, the LKP and LDJS were legalised again and could operate openly. It was the only party de facto allowed to contest in the Soviet staged 1940 elections, which it did under the aegis of the "Latvian Working People's Bloc" (Latvian: Latviešu darba tautas bloks) installed by the Communists themselves. The party later merged into the Communist Party of the Soviet Union (Bolsheviks). As the Latvian branch of CPSU(b) it was renamed as Communist Party of Latvia (Bolshevik) (Latvian: Latvijas Komunistiskā (boļševiku) partija, (LK(b)P). When the CPSU(b) was renamed the Communist Party of the Soviet Union in 1952, the Latvian branch was reconstituted under the old name LKP.

Main office in Riga

Article 6 of the Latvian SSR Constitution (1978) made the LKP's monopoly on political power in Soviet Latvia explicit. In 1990, the Supreme Council of the Republic of Latvia (formerly the Latvian SSR Supreme Soviet, now dominated by the Latvian Popular Front) voted to remove Article 6 from the Constitution.

On 14 April 1990, a pro-independence faction under Ivars Ķezbers split off from the LKP to form the Independent Communist Party of Latvia (Latvian: Latvijas Neatkarīgā komunistiskā partija). The main body of the LKP, under the chairmanship of Alfrēds Rubiks, remained loyal to Moscow and the CPSU leadership. Later that same year, on 14 September, Ķezbers's party was officially renamed the Democratic Labour Party of Latvia (Latvian: Latvijas Demokrātiskā darba partija, LDDP) and adopted nominally social-democratic platform.

=== Post-independence, 1990–1993 ===
Following Latvia's renewed independence from the Soviet Union, the LKP was banned by a decision of the Supreme Council of the Republic of Latvia on 10 September 1991 as an organisation deemed hostile to Latvia's independence. In October of that year, the official newspaper of the Communist Party of Latvia Cīņa, was shut down and banned. Later, an organization by the name of the League of Communists of Latvia was created by Albert Lebedev. However, registration to this organization was denied. In 1993, it was indicated that the League of Communists of Latvia became affiliated to the Union of Communist Parties – Communist Party of the Soviet Union. Since then the party has operated underground and under "certain conditions".

In 1994, the Socialist Party of Latvia was founded as the successor to the LKP.

== Press ==
Cīņa (Struggle) was a newspaper founded in March 1904 as the Central Organ of the Latvian Social-Democrats. It was published periodically in Riga, Brussels and Petrograd. From 1919 it was the organ of the Communist Party of Latvia.

While the LKP leadership was in exile in the USSR during the interwar years and the Nazi occupation in World War II, Cīņa was published in the Russian SFSR. From 1940 onwards it was published in Riga.

In the Latvian SSR, Cīņa was one of the main Latvian-language dailies. In 1990, when the Ķezbers faction split from the main LKP to form the Independent Communists, they changed the name of the newspaper to Neatkarīgā Cīņa (The Independent Struggle), which after privatisation in the 1990s later became Neatkarīgā Rīta Avīze.

The Russian-language sister publication to Cīņa published by the LKP was the daily Sovetskaya Latviya (Soviet Latvia); while the daily Padomju Jaunatne (Soviet Youth) was the newspaper of the Latvian Young Communist League.

In the Latvian SSR, the LKP also published a monthly political journal Padomju Latvijas Komunists (Communist of Soviet Latvia, ISSN 0132-6430; in the 1940s and '50s: Padomju Latvijas Boļševiks), with a parallel edition in Russian (Kommunist Sovetskoi Latvii, ISSN 0321-2092). The journal ceased publication in 1990.

== First Secretaries of the Communist Party of Latvia ==
First Secretary	Dates in office
Jānis Kalnbērziņš (1893–1986)	25 August 1940 – 25 November 1959 (in exile in Russia, 1941–1944)
Arvīds Pelše (1899–1983)	25 November 1959 – 15 April 1966
Augusts Voss (1919–1994)	15 April 1966 – 14 April 1984
Boriss Pugo (1937–1991)	14 April 1984 – 4 October 1988
Jānis Vagris (1930–2023)	4 October 1988 – 7 April 1990 ("Leading" role of the party abolished 11 January 1990)
Alfrēds Rubiks (born 1935)	7 April 1990 – 10 September 1991

== Second Secretaries of the Communist Party of Latvia ==
Second Secretary	Dates in office
Žanis Spure	August – December 1940
Ivan Lebedev	1944 – January 1949
Fedor Titov	January 1949 – 1952?
Valentin Ershov	1952 ? – June 1953
Vilis Krūmiņš	June 1953 – January 1956
Filipp Lashnikov	January 1956 – January 1958?
Arvīds Pelše	January – April 1958?
Vilis Krūmiņš	April 1958? – February 1960
Mikhail Gribkov	February 1960 – 1963
Nikolai Belukha	1963–1978
Igor Strelkov	1978–1980
Valentin Dmitriev	1980–1986
Vitaly Sobolev	1986–1990

== See also ==
- Pēteris Stučka
- Imants Sudmalis
- Vilis Lācis
- Eduards Berklavs
- Tatjana Ždanoka
- International Front of the Working People of Latvia
