= Second Dombrovskis cabinet =

The second Dombrovskis cabinet was the government of Latvia from 3 November 2010 to 25 October 2011. It was the second government to be led by Valdis Dombrovskis, who was Prime Minister between 2009 and 2014. It took office on 3 November 2010, after the October 2010 election, succeeding the first Dombrovskis cabinet, which had lasted from 2009 to 2010. It was replaced by the third Dombrovskis cabinet on 25 October 2011, after the September 2011 election.

Position	Name	Party	Dates
Prime Minister of Latvia	Valdis Dombrovskis	Unity / New Era Party	3 November 2010 – 25 October 2011
Deputy Prime Minister; Minister for Defence	Artis Pabriks	Unity / Society for Other Politics	3 November 2010 – 25 October 2011
Minister for Foreign Affairs	Ģirts Valdis Kristovskis	Unity / Civic Union	3 November 2010 – 25 October 2011
Minister for Economics	Artis Kampars	Unity / New Era Party	3 November 2010 – 25 October 2011
Minister for Finance	Andris Vilks	Unity / Civic Union	3 November 2010 – 25 October 2011
Minister for the Interior	Linda Mūrniece	Unity / New Era Party	3 November 2010 – 6 June 2011
Minister for the Interior	Aigars Štokenbergs (interim)	Unity / New Era Party	6 June 2011 – 25 October 2011
Minister for Education and Science	Rolands Broks	Union of Greens and Farmers	3 November 2010 – 25 October 2011
Minister for Culture	Sarmīte Ēlerte	Unity / Civic Union	3 November 2010 – 25 October 2011
Minister for Welfare	Ilona Jurševska	Unity / Civic Union	3 November 2010 – 25 October 2011
Minister for Regional Development and Local Government	Valdis Dombrovskis	Unity / New Era Party	3 November 2010 – 1 January 2011
Minister for Transport	Uldis Augulis	Union of Greens and Farmers	3 November 2010 – 25 October 2011
Minister for Justice	Aigars Štokenbergs	Unity / Society for Other Politics	3 November 2010 – 25 October 2011
Minister for Health	Juris Bārzdiņš	Union of Greens and Farmers	3 November 2010 – 25 October 2011
Minister for the Environment	Raimonds Vējonis	Union of Greens and Farmers	3 November 2010 – 1 January 2011
Minister for Environmental Protection and Regional Development	Raimonds Vējonis	Union of Greens and Farmers	6 January 2011 – 25 October 2011
Minister for Agriculture	Jānis Dūklavs	Union of Greens and Farmers	3 November 2010 – 25 October 2011
