= Guntars Galvanovskis =

Latvian businessman and politician

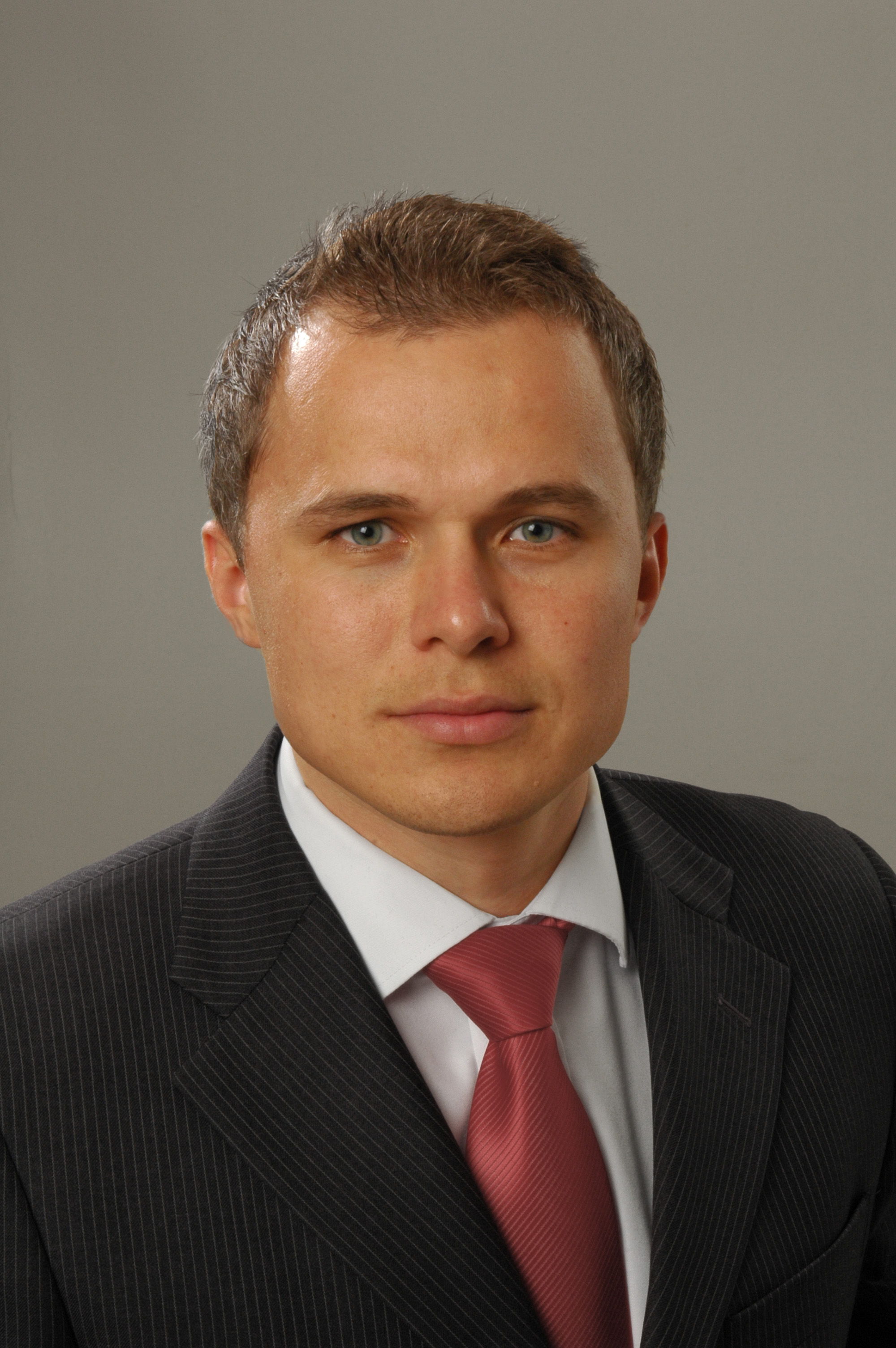

Personal details
- Born: 15 May 1982 (age 44) Cēsis, Latvia
- Party: ZPR
- Education: Vidzeme University of Applied Sciences
- Occupation: Politician

Guntars Galvanovskis (born 15 May 1982 in Cesis) is a Latvian businessman and politician. He has been a member of the Valmiera City Council and the 10th Saeima.

== Biography ==
Guntars Galvanovskis was born on 15 May 1982.In 2009 he graduated from Vidzeme University of Applied Sciences with a Bachelor's degree in Business Administration, in 2010 he obtained a Master's degree from the same university.

He has been the chairman of the board of BK Valmiera from 2009 to 2018 (serving three years as an honorary president and six years as the club president). Under his leadership, BK Valmiera won the Latvian Basketball League championship in 2016. In the same season, they also achieved the title of champions in the Baltic Basketball League.

G. Galvanovskis is the sole owner of the forestry company "Dižozols", while his spouse, the former model Kate Glika, is the majority owner of the related company "BONO".

=== Political career ===
In 2009, he was elected to the Valmiera City Council on the list of the New Era Party. In 2010, he ran for the 10th Saeima elections from the list of the association Unity in Vidzeme region and was elected. In 2011, together with party member Klāvs Olšteins, he resigned from "Jaunā laika" and resigned from the parliament to join the newly founded Reform Party (he was among its founders). During this time, he was also a freelance advisor at the Ministry of Economics.

In October 2011, G. Galvanovskis was expelled from the Zatlers' Reform Party for organizing an uncoordinated and individual campaign during the pre-election period and did not run in the extraordinary elections of the 11th Saeima.
