= Ingmārs Čaklais =

Latvian director, educator, public relations specialist, lawyer, and politician

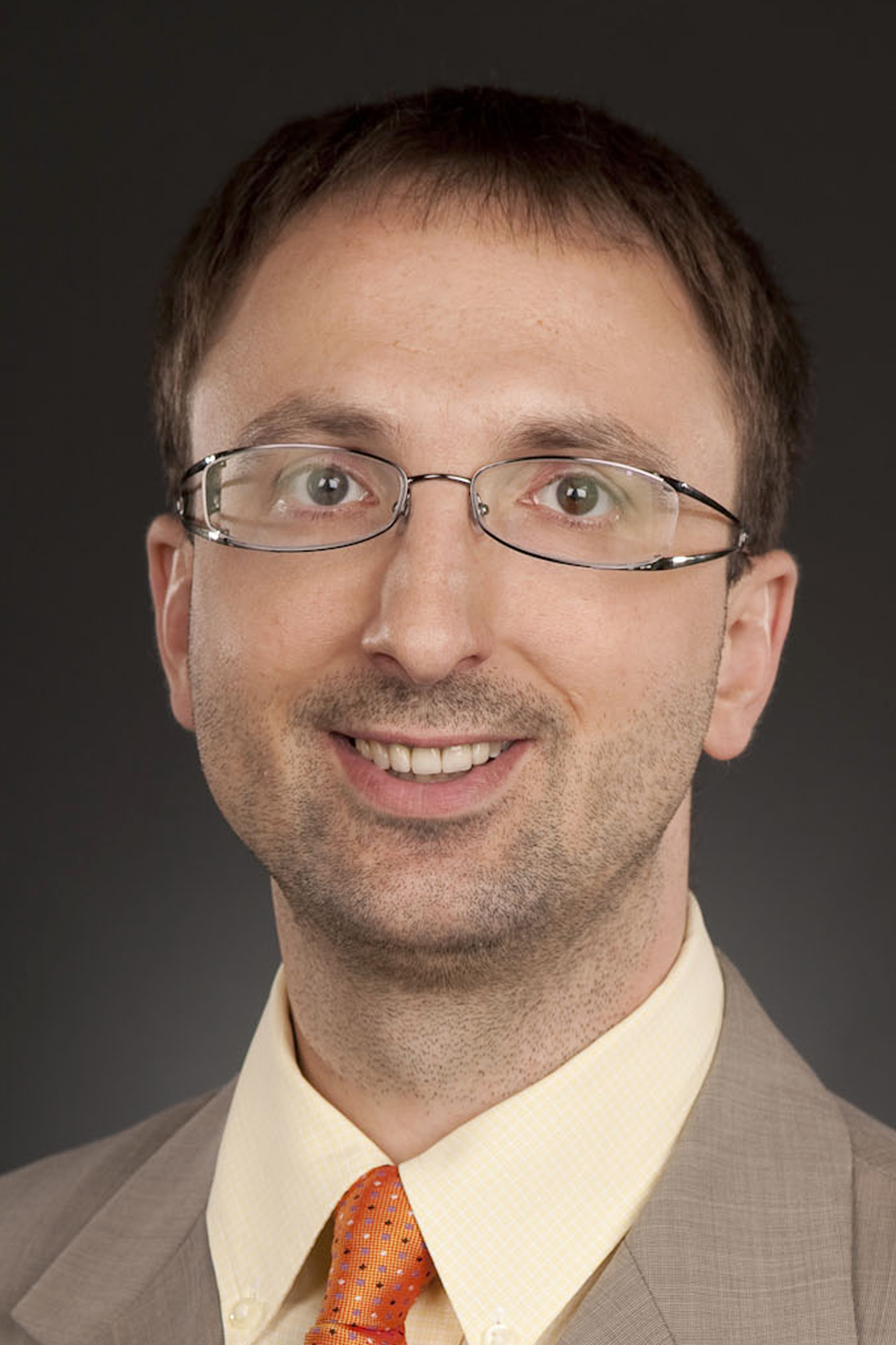

Personal details
- Born: April 27, 1971 (age 55) Riga, Latvia
- Party: Unity
- Parent: Māris Čaklais (father)
- Education: |University of Latvia; Baltic International Academy; Jāzeps Vītols Latvian Academy of Music
- Occupation: Cultural worker, lawyer, educator, politician

Ingmārs Čaklais (born April 27, 1971, in Riga, Latvia) is a Latvian director, educator, public relations specialist, lawyer, and politician. He has served as a deputy in the 10th and 11th Saeimas (Latvian Parliament), representing the Unity party. He is the son of poet and publicist Māris Čaklais.

== Biography ==
Ingmārs Čaklais was born into the family of poet and publicist Māris Čaklais and actress Valda (Freimute) Čaklais. He received his education at Riga Secondary School No. 49 (1989), the Latvian Academy of Music (1993), the University of Latvia (1995), and the Baltic International Academy (2007, 2009).

In the early 1990s, Ingmārs Čaklais worked as the head of the Cultural House School Theater under the Ministry of Education, as a director for children's and youth programs at Latvian Television, as a teacher at Riga French Lyceum, as well as the head of the "Tunelis" theater and as a teacher at Riga English Gymnasium where he led the theater group "Tragic Bunch" (TS RAĢ TRAĢ). From 1999 to 2003, he was the head of the Latvian Playwrights' Agency. Alongside, he worked as a lawyer until his election to the Saeima (Parliament) in 2010. He was also the host of the Latvian Television show "Personas kods" and served as the head of the Public Relations Department of Jūrmala City Council for six years starting from 2004. Additionally, he was involved in the Riga Latvian Society and served as its chairman from February 3, 2010, to July 20, 2011.

In 2016, a judgment was passed declaring Ingmārs Čaklais guilty of substantial tax evasion.

Ingmārs Čaklais joined the Civic Union party in 2010 and was elected to the 10th Saeima from the coalition list of the Unity party. A year later, he also ran in the extraordinary 11th Saeima elections but was not elected. However, on November 3, 2011, during Valdis Dombrovskis temporary tenure as the Prime Minister, Ingmārs Čaklais assumed the position of a Member of Parliament.

In 2013, due to financial and health issues, Ingmārs Čaklais resigned from his position as a Member of Parliament and left Latvia.
