= Third Dombrovskis cabinet =

The third Dombrovskis cabinet was the government of Latvia from 25 October 2011 to 22 January 2014. It was the third government to be led by Valdis Dombrovskis who was Prime Minister from 2009 until 2014. It took office after the September 2011 election, succeeding the second Dombrovskis cabinet, which had lasted from 2010 to 2011.

Position	Name	Party	Dates
Prime Minister	Valdis Dombrovskis	Unity	25 October 2011 - 22 January 2014
Deputy Prime Minister; Minister for Defence	Artis Pabriks	Unity	25 October 2011 - 22 January 2014
Minister for Foreign Affairs	Edgars Rinkēvičs	Reform Party	25 October 2011 - 22 January 2014
Minister for Economics	Daniels Pavļuts	Reform Party	25 October 2011 - 22 January 2014
Minister for Finance	Andris Vilks	Unity	25 October 2011 - 22 January 2014
Minister for the Interior	Rihards Kozlovskis	Reform Party	25 October 2011 - 22 January 2014
Minister for Education and Science	Roberts Ķīlis	Independent	25 October 2011 - 30 April 2013
Minister for Education and Science	Rihards Kozlovskis (interim)	Reform Party	30 April 2013 - 2 May 2013
Minister for Education and Science	Vjačeslavs Dombrovskis	Reform Party	2 May 2013 - 22 January 2014
Minister for Culture	Žaneta Jaunzeme-Grende	National Alliance	25 October 2011 - 16 September 2013
Minister for Culture	Jānis Bordāns (interim)	National Alliance	17 September 2013 - 30 October 2013
Minister for Culture	Dace Melbārde	Independent	31 October 2013 - 22 January 2014
Minister for Welfare	Ilze Viņķele	Unity	25 October 2011 - 22 January 2014
Minister for Environmental Protection and Regional Development	Edmunds Sprūdžs	Reform Party	25 October 2011 - 1 December 2013
Minister for Environmental Protection and Regional Development	Daniels Pavļuts (interim)	Independent	1 December 2013 - 22 January 2014
Minister for Transport	Aivis Ronis	Independent	25 October 2011 - 1 March 2013
Minister for Transport	Anrijs Matīss	Independent	1 March 2013 - 22 January 2014
Minister for Justice	Gaidis Bērziņš	National Alliance	25 October 2011 - 21 June 2012
Minister for Justice	Žaneta Jaunzeme-Grende (interim)	National Alliance	21 June 2012 - 5 July 2012
Minister for Justice	Jānis Bordāns	National Alliance	5 July 2012 - 22 January 2014
Minister for Health	Ingrīda Circene	Unity	25 October 2011 - 22 January 2014
Minister for Agriculture	Laimdota Straujuma	Independent	25 October 2011 - 22 January 2014
