= Edgars Rinkēvičs =

President of Latvia since 2023

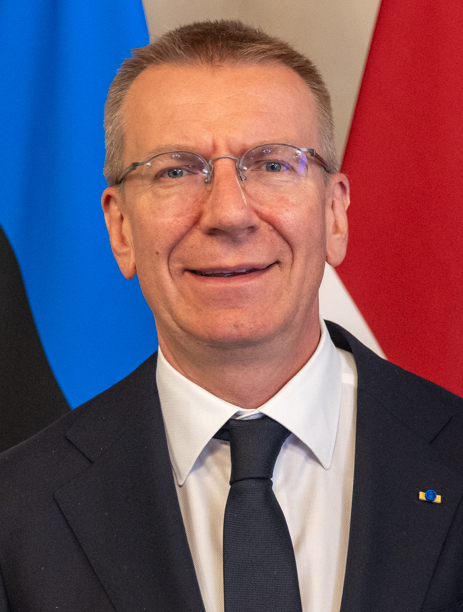
- Rinkēvičs in 2026

11th President of Latvia
- Incumbent
- Assumed office 8 July 2023
- Prime Minister: Krišjānis Kariņš; Evika Siliņa; Andris Kulbergs
- Preceded by: Egils Levits

Minister of Foreign Affairs
- In office 25 October 2011 – 8 July 2023
- Prime Minister: Valdis Dombrovskis; Laimdota Straujuma; Māris Kučinskis; Krišjānis Kariņš
- Preceded by: Ģirts Valdis Kristovskis
- Succeeded by: Krišjānis Kariņš

President of the Committee of Ministers of the Council of Europe
- In office 17 May 2023 – 8 July 2023
- Preceded by: Þórdís Kolbrún R. Gylfadóttir
- Succeeded by: Krišjānis Kariņš

Personal details
- Born: 21 September 1973 (age 53) Jūrmala, then part of Latvian SSR, Soviet Union
- Party: Independent (2023–present)
- Other political affiliations: Latvian Way (1998–2004); Reform Party (2012–2014); Unity (2014–2023)
- Education: University of Latvia (BA); National Defense University (MA)

Edgars Rinkēvičs ([ˈedgars ˈriŋkeːvit͡ʃʃ]; born 21 September 1973) is a Latvian public official and politician serving as the 11th and current president of Latvia since July 2023. He previously served as the minister of foreign affairs of Latvia from 2011 to 2023, and head of the Chancery of the President of Latvia as state secretary of the Ministry of Defence, as well as a deputy of the Saeima. Upon taking office as president, Rinkēvičs became the first openly gay head of state in a European Union country.

Prior to becoming president, Rinkēvičs had represented Latvian Way, Reform Party, and the Unity party since May 2014. He left Unity after being elected president as it is customarily expected in Latvia for presidents to maintain political neutrality.

== Early life and education ==
Rinkēvičs was born in Jūrmala, where he completed high school in 1991. Upon graduating from high school, he started a bachelor's degree at the University of Latvia's Faculty of History and Philosophy, which he acquired in 1995. During the same time, in 1994 and 1995 he studied Political Science and International Relations at the University of Groningen in the Netherlands, for which he received a certificate in 1995. In 1997, he obtained his master's degree in political science, followed by a second master's degree from the Dwight D. Eisenhower School for National Security and Resource Strategy, (Note: Sources state Rinkēvičs studied at the Industrial College of the Armed Forces of the US National Defence University as this was the name of the Dwight D. Eisenhower School for National Security and Resource Strategy at that time. The name was changed to its current form in 2012.) of the National Defense University in the United States, obtained in 2000.

== Career ==
In 1993 and 1994, Rinkēvičs worked as a journalist reporting on foreign policy and international relations at Latvian Radio, while still studying. In 1995, he took the job as senior referent in the Policy Department of the Ministry of Defence, a role he held until March 1996, when he became acting leader of the Policy Department, a role he occupied until September the same year, when he was made acting Deputy Secretary of State for Defence. In May 1997, he became acting Secretary of State for Defence, before becoming the main Secretary of State for Defence in August 1997, a role he possessed until October 2008.

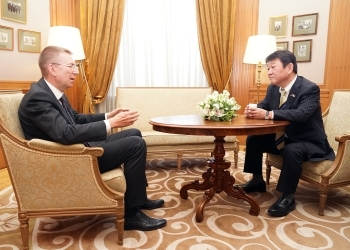
Rinkēvičs with Japanese Minister of Foreign Affairs Toshimitsu Motegi, 2 July 2021

Between 1998 and 2004, Rinkēvičs was a member of the Latvian Way party. In February 1998, he became involved in discussion on the US-Baltic Partnership Charter, and from 2002 to 2003 was a member of the Latvian delegation negotiating accession to NATO as Latvia's Deputy Head of Delegation. In 2008, he was appointed as Head of the Chancery of the President of Latvia, a role he held until July 2011. In October of the same year, Rinkēvičs joined Valdis Dombrovskis' third cabinet as Minister of Foreign Affairs. Initially an independent, he joined the Zatlers' Reform Party in January 2012. In May 2014, Rinkēvičs joined the Unity party.

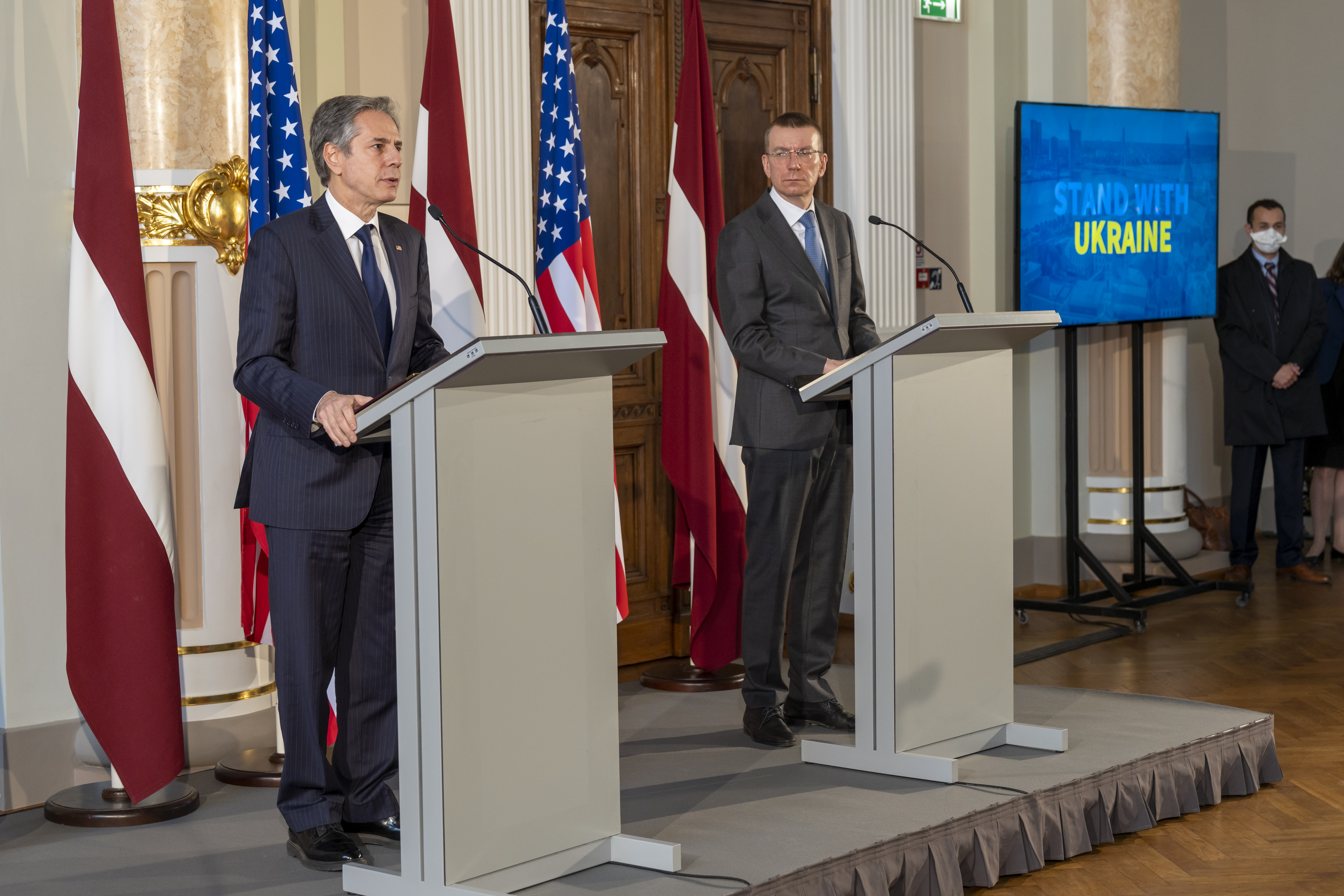
Rinkēvičs with U.S. Secretary of State Antony Blinken, 7 March 2022

Following the resignation of the Dombrovskis cabinet in 2014, he continued his ministerial roles in Laimdota Straujuma's first cabinet. In 2014 he stood in the parliamentary elections and was elected to parliament before again being confirmed to serve as Minister of Foreign Affairs, this time in Straujuma's second cabinet. He served as Minister of Foreign Affairs from 2016 to 2019 in the Kučinskis cabinet and from 2019 to 2023 in the Kariņš cabinet.

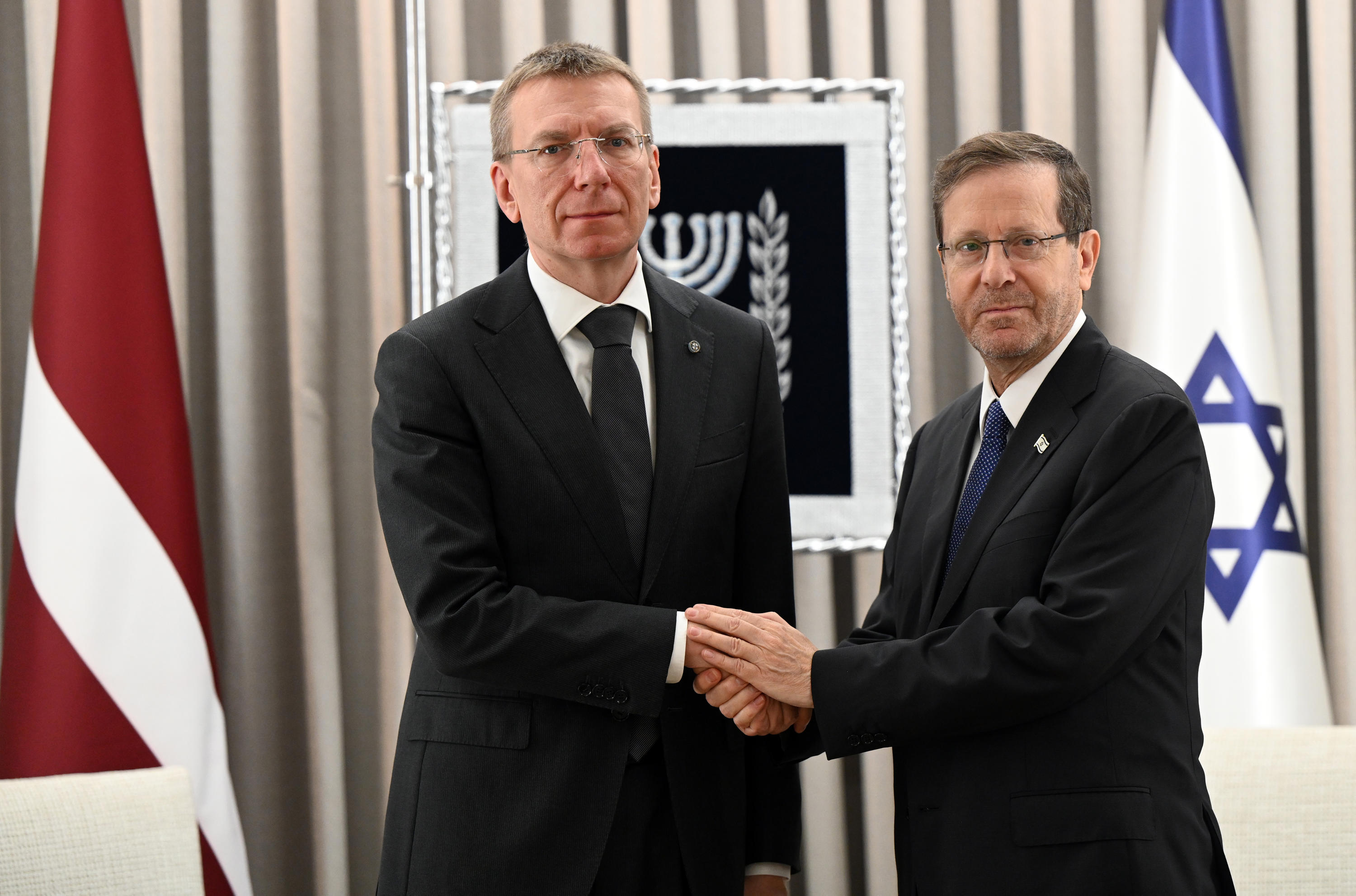
Rinkēvičs meets with Israeli President Isaac Herzog in Jerusalem, 20 November 2023

In September 2020, Rinkēvičs said he welcomed the news about the establishment of full diplomatic relations between Israel and Bahrain. He also expressed deep concern over the escalation of hostilities in the disputed region of Nagorno-Karabakh and called on Armenia and Azerbaijan to immediately halt fighting and progress towards a peaceful resolution.

=== President of Latvia (2023–present) ===
Rinkēvičs was elected president of Latvia on 31 May 2023. He took office on 8 July 2023.

On 20 November 2023, he visited Israel to express solidarity with the country during the Gaza war.

On 15 December 2023, Rinkēvičs met with Canadian Minister of Defence Bill Blair in the Riga Castle to discuss bilateral cooperation between the two countries, especially in the areas of defence and security policy.

On 5 August 2025, Rinkēvičs welcomed Israeli President Isaac Herzog to Latvia, stating that the country does not currently plan to recognize Palestine. On 28 August, Rinkēvičs met with Minister of Foreign Affairs and Expatriates of Palestine Varsen Aghabekian.

Rinkēvičs with Polish President Karol Nawrocki in Riga, 11 December 2025

After the Saeima passed a bill on 30 October for Latvia to withdraw from the Istanbul Convention, Rinkēvičs pledged to assess the decision by "taking into account state and legal, rather than ideological or political considerations". He subsequently requested a second review of the law by the Saeima, citing unresolved legal, procedural, and international concerns: namely, that the withdrawal lacked proper preparatory work, reflected insufficient cooperation between the legislature and executive, and that ratifying and then denouncing the Convention within a single Saeima term sends a contradictory message that could undermine Latvia's credibility and commitments to human rights within the European Union and Council of Europe.

Rinkēvičs has described the U.S.-Israel military operation against Iran as an understandable response to decades of Iranian actions. While expressing a preference for diplomacy, Rinkēvičs stipulated that diplomatic engagement is only viable if Iran abandons its military nuclear program.

== Personal life ==
On 6 November 2014, he publicly announced on his Twitter profile that he is gay, making him the first lawmaker in Latvia to announce his homosexuality. Upon election as the president of Latvia in 2023, Rinkēvičs became the first openly gay head of state in an EU country and the first ever openly gay president of any state. (Note: Rinkēvičs is the first openly LGBT head of state to hold the title of president. Paolo Rondelli, who held the post of Captain Regent of San Marino in 2022, was the first openly LGBT head of state of any country.) In addition to Latvian, he is fluent in English, Russian, and French.

In May 2023, Rinkēvičs stated that he is "single", has no romantic partner, and refused to further elaborate on his private life.

== Views ==
=== On LGBT issues ===
Rinkēvičs has said that despite some progress, LGBT people still face serious rights violations in many countries, and expressed support for global efforts to decriminalize LGBT relations, stressing that it is about universal human rights, not imposing Western values. Citing cases like Chechnya, he warned of worsening persecution and torture of LGBT people and called on the international community to use all available diplomatic and bilateral tools to strengthen civil society, protect human rights, and eliminate all forms of discrimination. In an interview with Latvian news portal Delfi, Latvian drag queen and LGBT activist Rojs Rodžers stated that he wanted that Rinkēvičs be "a little braver" on LGBT rights issues and that he was "more on side being disappointed" that Rinkēvičs has not participated in Pride events.

In January 2025, Rinkēvičs stated in interview with Channel 4 News that in his opinion the discussions around trans rights, at some point, "went probably too far to one extreme" and expressed hope that "it’s not going to go too far to the other extreme".

== Honours ==
=== National ===
- Commander Grand Cross with Chain of the Order of the Three Stars (8 July 2023)
- Grand Cross of the Cross of Recognition (8 July 2023)
- Commander Grand Cross of the Order of Viesturs (17 November 2004)
- Grand Officer of the Order of the Three Stars (27 April 2007)
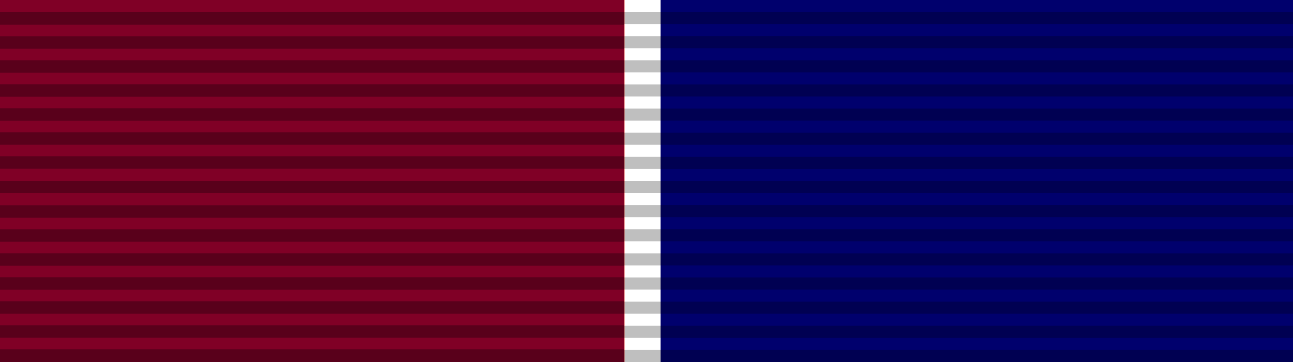
- Recipient of the Commemorative Medal for Advancing Latvia's Membership to NATO (19 March 2004)
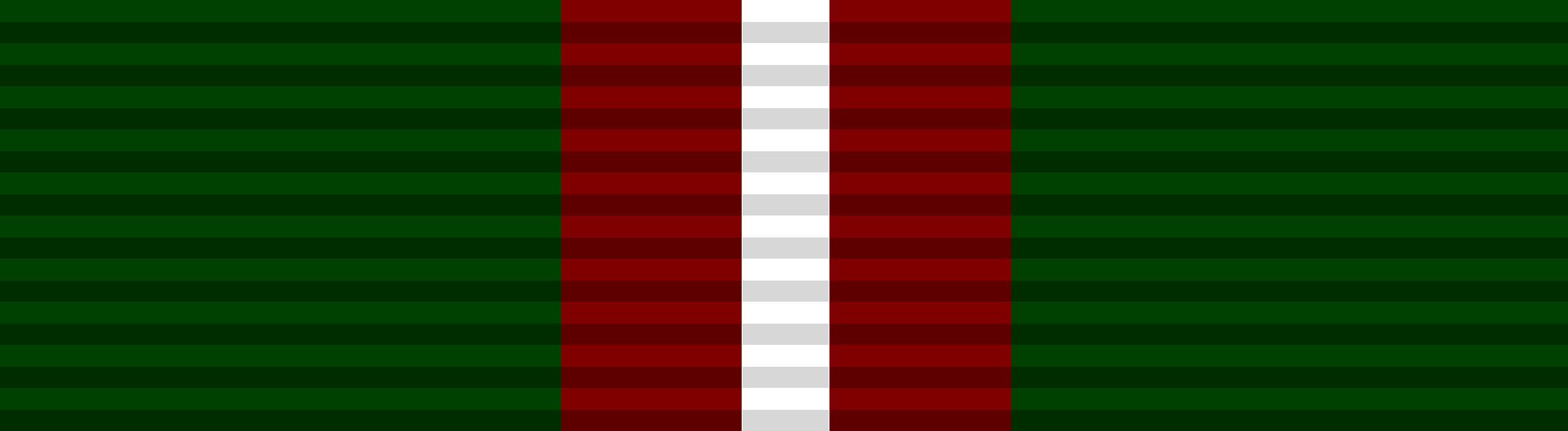
- Recipient of the Medal of Honourable Merit for Contribution to Armed Forces Development (2000)

=== Foreign ===
- Czech Republic: Grand Cross with Collar of the Order of the White Lion (10 March 2026)
- Denmark: Knight of the Order of the Elephant (28 October 2025)
- Estonia:
  - Collar of the Order of the Cross of Terra Mariana (1 July 2026)
  - First Class of the Order of the Cross of Terra Mariana (10 April 2019)
  - Second Class of the Order of the Cross of Terra Mariana (2 April 2009)
  - Third Class of the Order of the Cross of Terra Mariana (5 December 2005)
- Finland:
  - Commander First Class of the Order of the Lion of Finland (9 October 2013)
  - Grand Cross with Collar of the Order of the White Rose (16 September 2025)
- Germany: Grand Cross 1st Class of the Order of Merit of the Federal Republic of Germany (22 February 2019)
- Greece: Grand cross of the Order of the Redeemer (2 July 2024)
- Italy:
  - Knight Grand Cross of the Order of Merit of the Italian Republic (14 January 2019)
  - Grand Officer of the Order of Merit of the Italian Republic (27 June 2005)
- Luxembourg: Grand Officer of the Order of the Oak Crown (2023)
- Malta: Honorary Companion of Honour with Collar of the National Order of Merit (5 February 2024)
- Netherlands: Grand Officer of the Order of Orange-Nassau (11 June 2018)
- Norway: Grand Cross of the Royal Norwegian Order of Merit (18 March 2015)
- Poland:
  - Commander's Cross of the Order of Merit of the Republic of Poland (2005)
  - Knight of the Order of the White Eagle (18 February 2025)
- Ukraine: First Class of the Order of Merit (29 August 2022)
- NATO: Recipient of the NATO Meritorious Service Medal (10 January 2007)
- Baltic Assembly: Medal of the Baltic Assembly (10 November 2017)

== See also ==
- List of foreign ministers in 2021
- List of openly LGBT heads of state and government

== Notes ==
Political offices
Preceded by Ģirts Valdis Kristovskis	Minister of Foreign Affairs; 2011–2023	Succeeded by Arturs Krišjānis Kariņš
Preceded by Egils Levits	President of Latvia; 2023–present	Incumbent
