= Ģirts Valdis Kristovskis =

Latvian politician

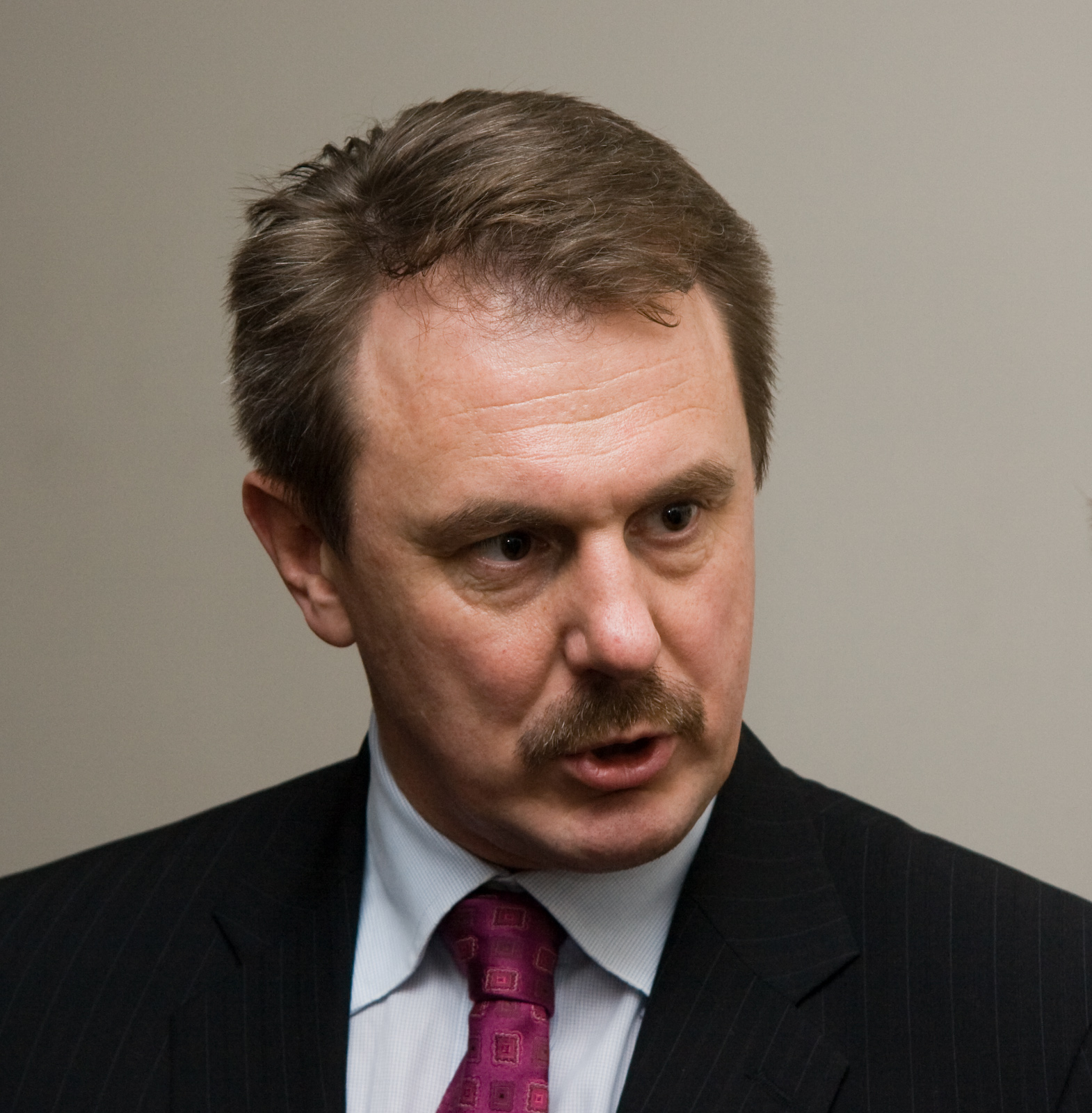
- Kristovskis in 2008

Minister of Foreign Affairs
- In office 3 November 2010 – 25 October 2011
- Prime Minister: Valdis Dombrovskis
- Preceded by: Aivis Ronis
- Succeeded by: Edgars Rinkēvičs

Member of the European Parliament for Latvia
- In office 2004–2009

Minister of Defence
- In office 1998–2004
- Preceded by: Tālavs Jundzis
- Succeeded by: Atis Slakteris

Minister of the Interior of Latvia
- In office 1993–1994
- Preceded by: Ziedonis Chevers
- Succeeded by: Jānis Ādamsons

Personal details
- Born: 19 February 1962 (age 64) Ventspils, Latvian SSR, Soviet Union
- Party: Unity (since 2011)
- Other political affiliations: Civic Union (2008–2011); For Fatherland and Freedom/LNNK (1998–2008); Latvian Way (1993–1998)
- Occupation: Politician

Ģirts Valdis Kristovskis (born 19 February 1962) is a Latvian politician. He is a member of the centre-right Unity party.

Kristovskis has served in Latvian cabinets, as the Minister for the Interior from 3 August 1993 to 28 October 1994, when he resigned), and the Minister of the Defense from 26 November 1998 to 9 March 2004. He was elected to the Saeima in four subsequent elections since 1993, being a member of Latvian Way party in 1993–1998 of For Fatherland and Freedom/LNNK party in 1998–2008. At the 2004 European election he was elected as a Member of the European Parliament (MEP) representing For Fatherland and Freedom/LNNK, but lost his mandate in the 2009 elections. Subsequently, he was elected to the Riga City Council where he was the leader of the opposition.

In 2008 he founded the centre right Civic Union party which became a founding member of the Unity coalition which won the largest mandate the 2010 Saeima elections. On 3 November 2010 Kristovskis became the Foreign Minister in the new Cabinet. In November, a scandal erupted in Latvia concerning the minister's correspondence with a doctor, who had expressed views perceived as Russophobic. Kristovskis survived the vote of non-confidence held on 9 November (36 deputies representing the opposition parties of the pro-Russian Harmony Center coalition and the right-wing For a Good Latvia voted for the proposal, with 51 deputies from the governing coalition voting against). Between 3 November 2010 and 25 October 2011 he served as the Minister for Foreign Affairs of Latvia. Kristovskis lost his seat in the Saeima as a result of the 2011 Latvian parliamentary election.

He is a signatory of the Prague Declaration on European Conscience and Communism, and co-sponsored the European Parliament resolution of 2 April 2009 on European conscience and totalitarianism.
