= 2010 Latvian parliamentary election =

Parliamentary election held in Latvia

- 2 October 2010
Party	Leader	Vote %	Seats	+/–
Unity	Valdis Dombrovskis	31.90	33	+15
Harmony Centre	Jānis Urbanovičs	26.61	29	+12
ZZS	Aivars Lembergs	20.11	22	+4
NA	Roberts Zile	7.84	8	0
For a Good Latvia	Ainārs Šlesers	7.82	8	−25
This lists parties that won seats. See the complete results below.
Results by electoral district
Prime Minister before	Prime Minister after
Valdis Dombrovskis; New Era	Valdis Dombrovskis; Unity

Parliamentary elections were held in Latvia on 2 October 2010. It was the first parliamentary election to be held in Latvia since the beginning of the 2008 Latvian financial crisis during which Latvia had experienced one of the deepest recessions in the world.

A total of 1,239 candidates representing 13 parties or alliances stood in five electoral constituencies equivalent to the four regions of Latvia and Riga city. With 1012 of 1013 polling stations counted, results showed an increase in support for the incumbent coalition government of Valdis Dombrovskis, with 58% of the vote and 63 of the 100 seats.

== Background ==
After the 2009 Riga riot, which was due to the effects of the 2008 financial crisis on Latvia, some politicians saw early elections as the only way to confront the people's anger. The elections were to be averted if the Saeima passed constitutional reform laws, including a law to allow referendums on dissolving parliament, by 31 March 2009; if this had not happened, the President of Latvia, Valdis Zatlers, would have dissolved parliament.

After surviving a vote of no confidence in early February, PM Ivars Godmanis resigned on 20 February 2009 after the two largest parties (People's Party and the Union of Greens and Farmers) called for his dismissal. A new government was formed, headed by Valdis Dombrovskis. There were also discussions that President Zatlers might use the parliamentary dissolution power of Latvian President to call a referendum on holding early elections. Zatlers stated on 23 February 2009 that early elections might be necessary, and that he was willing to extend the deadline for reforms from 31 March for one week to 7 April 2009 due to the collapse of the government.

The tasks given to parliament were: pass constitutional amendments to allow the people to dissolve parliament, passing electoral reforms and setting up an economic supervisory council for the recovery plan and international loans. The tasks given to the government were: coming up with a recovery plan and implementing it, appointing a new head for the Corruption Prevention Board, and reorganising the government and public administration. Zatlers stated he would hold talks with politicians from all parties on 31 March 2009 and announce his assessment of the situation on the same day.

On 31 March 2009, Zatlers announced he would not dissolve parliament. The Saeima was to consider constitutional amendments as early as 9 April 2009.

== Changes to the electoral law ==
Several changes to the election law took effect for this election. The so-called "locomotive law" (Latvian: lokomotīvju likuma) meant that candidates were restricted to standing in one constituency. In addition to completing registration forms in paper format, for the first time, parties also had to register electronically. Voting hours were shortened, with polling stations closing two hours earlier at 8 pm instead of 10 pm. Finally laws relating to election spending were tightened, in particular, laws against third party advertising on behalf of political parties were strengthened.

== Contesting parties ==
There are thirteen parties and electoral alliances running:

- FHRUL (For Human Rights in United Latvia) (PCTVL – Par cilvēka tiesībām vienotā Latvijā)
- Unity (Vienotība): comprising the New Era Party, Civic Union and Society for Other Politics
- Made in Latvia (Ražots Latvijā)
- Association of political parties 'Harmony Centre' (Politisko partiju apvienība 'Saskaņas Centrs'): formed by the Social Democratic Party "Harmony", Socialist Party of Latvia and the Daugavpils City Party
- People's Control (Tautas kontrole)
- Union of Greens and Farmers (Zaļo un Zemnieku savienība): consisting of the Latvian Farmers' Union and the Green Party of Latvia
- For Presidential Republic (Par prezidentālu republiku)
- For a Good Latvia (Par labu Latviju): of the People's Party, Latvia's First Party/Latvian Way and For a Good Latvia
- RESPONSIBILITY – Social Democratic Association of Political Parties (ATBILDĪBA – sociāldemokrātiska politisko partiju apvienība)
- Party 'Daugava - For Latvia' (Partija 'Daugava – Latvijai')
- The Last Party (Pēdējā partija)
- National Alliance 'All for Latvia!' – 'For Fatherland and Freedom/LNNK' (Nacionālā apvienība 'Visu Latvijai' – 'Tēvzemei un Brīvībai/LNNK'): consisting of For Fatherland and Freedom/LNNK and All for Latvia!
- Christian Democratic Union (Kristīgi demokrātiskā savienība)

=== New electoral alliances established ===
In the run-up to the election, three right-wing parties (New Era Party, Civic Union and Society for Other Politics) established an alliance called Unity on 6 March 2010. Furthermore, most of the parties constituting the Harmony Centre alliance (National Harmony Party, New Centre and Social Democratic Party – but not the Socialist Party of Latvia and the Daugavpils City Party) had merged into the Social Democratic Party "Harmony" on 10 February 2010. On 22 April 2010, the People's Party and the Latvia's First Party/Latvian Way formed an electoral alliance (including the newly founded businessmen's movement For a Good Latvia) called For a Good Latvia.

When Unity declined to include For Fatherland and Freedom/LNNK and the populist radical right All for Latvia! in their alliance on 28 May 2010 the two parties formed an electoral alliance instead.

== Pre-election debates ==
Numerous televised debates took place prior to the election. These involved either the party leaders or other senior party figures. In all, seven debates took place on the LNT Channel, five of these were held on a regional basis and all involved parties which were polling 2% or above in opinion polls. A total of eleven debates took place on the LTV Channel, five of which were held on a regional basis, with one debate between the Prime Ministerial candidates and a further five held on the basis of five themes: Finance, Prosperity, Health, Economy and Development, and Education and Culture. Like the LNT debates, these involved parties which opinion polls indicated would poll 2% or more. A twelfth debate was held on LTV between the remaining seven parties or electoral lists which were not expected to poll 2%. The two debates held on the PBK Channel involved the four parties which the opinion polls indicated would poll 5% or more. However outgoing Prime Minister Valdis Dombrovskis refused to take part in the debate, following controversy over previous remarks made by the debate's moderator Aleksandr Gordon. Unity decided not to send a replacement and were absent from the debate.

== Opinion polls ==
Pre-election polls had indicated that the outgoing government could be re-elected however they had also pointed to the possibility of one of the main opposition parties, Harmony Centre, making gains and becoming the largest party in the Saeima.

According to a poll conducted in June by Latvijas fakti, Harmony Centre would get 18.5% of the vote; Unity, 16.2%; Union of Greens and Farmers, 11.3%; For a Good Latvia, 5.3% and National Alliance, 4.4%.

A later Latvijas Fakti poll conducted between 25 and 27 September 2010 showed 21.2% support for Harmony Centre, 19.2% for Unity, 9.9% for Greens and Farmers and For Fatherland and Freedom on 5.2%. For a Good Latvia, led by members of the previous government, was at 7.8%. About 19 percent of the 1,004 respondents were undecided. The margin of error was 3.2 percent.

== Conduct ==
OSCE/ODIHR Limited Election Observation Mission provided, among others, the following recommendations:

- allowing independent candidates to stand in elections;
- giving consideration to granting “non-citizens” of Latvia the right to vote in municipal elections;
- issuing voter education materials in minority languages, enabling use of minority languages when dealing with election authorities;
- stronger sanctions for campaign violations;
- reviewing candidacy restrictions based on lustration provisions with a view to bringing them to an early end.

== Results ==
Party	Votes	%	Seats	+/–
Unity	301,429	31.90	33	+15
Harmony Centre	251,400	26.61	29	+12
Union of Greens and Farmers	190,025	20.11	22	+4
National Alliance	74,029	7.84	8	0
For a Good Latvia	73,881	7.82	8	–25
For Human Rights in United Latvia	13,847	1.47	0	–6
Made in Latvia	9,380	0.99	0	New
Last Party	8,458	0.90	0	New
For a Presidential Republic	7,102	0.75	0	New
Responsibility – Social Democratic Alliance of Political Parties	6,139	0.65	0	New
People's Control	4,002	0.42	0	New
Christian Democratic Union	3,488	0.37	0	New
Daugava – For Latvia	1,661	0.18	0	New
Total	944,841	100.00	100	0
Valid votes	944,841	97.86		
Invalid/blank votes	20,697	2.14		
Total votes	965,538	100.00		
Registered voters/turnout	1,532,319	63.01		
Source: CVL, CVK, CVK

=== List of elected Deputies ===
Name	Alliance/party	Party	Constituency	Date of birth/death	Votes
Aigars Štokenbergs	VIENOTĪBA	SCP	Zemgale	1963/08/29	10,335
Aija Barča	ZZS	LP	Kurzeme	1949/10/26	4,969
Ainars Latkovskis	VIENOTĪBA	JL	Vidzeme	1967/12/23	11,764
Ainārs Šlesers	PLL	LPP/LC	Rīga	1970/01/22	14,532
Aivars Dronka	ZZS	LZS	Zemgale	1963	1,720
Aleksandrs Jakimovs	SC	S	Latgale	1961/10/01	6,107
Aleksandrs Sakovskis	SC	S	Vidzeme	1965/03/11	2,975
Aleksejs Burunovs	SC	DPP	Latgale	1950/06/28	7,602
Aleksejs Holostovs	SC	S	Rīga	1979/07/23	6,207
Aleksejs Loskutovs	VIENOTĪBA	SCP	Latgale	1962/08/22	8,643
Andrejs Klementjevs	SC	S	Rīga	1973/09/07	19,251
Andris Alberts Buiķis	VIENOTĪBA	JL	Rīga	1939/03/15-2022/10/06	11,515
Andris Bērziņš	ZZS	IND	Zemgale	1944/12/10	4,751
Andris Bērziņš	ZZS	LZS	Vidzeme	1955/11/26	3,798
Andris Šķēle	PLL	TP	Zemgale	1958/01/16	4,087
Andris Vilks	VIENOTĪBA	PS	Vidzeme	1963/06/15-2024/04/28	7,054
Armands Krauze	ZZS	LZS	Vidzeme	1970/06/10	2,199
Artis Kampars	VIENOTĪBA	JL	Zemgale	1967/05/03	10,505
Artis Pabriks	VIENOTĪBA	SCP	Vidzeme	1966/03/22	30,182
Artūrs Rubiks	SC	SLP	Rīga	1970/08/16	13,128
Arvils Ašeradens	VIENOTĪBA	PS	Vidzeme	1962/12/30	6,394
Atis Lejiņš	VIENOTĪBA	LSDSP	Zemgale	1942/09/28	9,407
Augusts Brigmanis	ZZS	LZS	Zemgale	1952/07/19	7,607
Boriss Cilevičs	SC	S	Rīga	1956/03/26	17,012
Dace Reinika	ZZS	LZS	Zemgale	1958/09/23	3,159
Dana Reizniece	ZZS	LuV	Kurzeme	1981/11/06	2,966
Dmitrijs Rodionovs	SC	S	Latgale	1980/09/07	5,088
Dzintars Ābiķis	VIENOTĪBA	SCP	Vidzeme	1952/06/03	11,016
Dzintars Rasnačs	NA	TB/LNNK	Rīga	1963/07/17	5,167
Dzintars Zaķis	VIENOTĪBA	JL	Zemgale	1970/05/26	8,517
Dzintra Hirša	VIENOTĪBA	PS	Vidzeme	1947/03/31	4,868
Edgars Zalāns	PLL	TP	Kurzeme	1967/09/03	2,861
Edvards Smiltēns	VIENOTĪBA	SCP	Vidzeme	1984/09/18	6,000
Einārs Cilinskis	NA	VL!	Rīga	1963/08/28	3,566
Gaidis Bērziņš	NA	TB/LNNK	Kurzeme	1970/10/20	2,197
Ģirts Valdis Kristovskis	VIENOTĪBA	PS	Rīga	1962/02/19	26,006
Gundars Daudze	ZZS	LuV	Kurzeme	1965/05/09	9,052
Guntars Galvanovskis	VIENOTĪBA	JL	Vidzeme	1982/05/15	4,883
Guntis Ulmanis	PLL	IND	Vidzeme	1939/09/13	4,228
Igors Meļņikovs	SC	S	Rīga	1969/06/26	6,791
Igors Pimenovs	SC	S	Rīga	1953/01/31	7,327
Igors Zujevs	SC	SLP	Rīga	1963/01/31	6,042
Ilma Čepāne	VIENOTĪBA	PS	Vidzeme	1947/04/29	25,764
Ilze Viņķele	VIENOTĪBA	PS	Rīga	1971/11/27	7,339
Imants Jānis Bekešs	PLL	TP	Latgale	1955/08/16	2,664
Imants Parādnieks	NA	VL!	Zemgale	1968/08/27	4,155
Imants Viesturs Lieģis	VIENOTĪBA	PS	Rīga	1955/04/30	8,363
Ina Druviete	VIENOTĪBA	PS	Vidzeme	1958/05/29	14,419
Inese Laizāne	NA	VL!	Latgale	1971/08/15-2024/09/04	651
Inese Šlesere	PLL	LPP/LC	Rīga	1972/08/02	3,672
Ingmārs Čaklais	VIENOTĪBA	PS	Vidzeme	1971/04/27	6,070
Ingmārs Līdaka	ZZS	LZP	Vidzeme	1966/08/13	17,524
Ingrīda Circene	VIENOTĪBA	JL	Kurzeme	1956/12/06	6,740
Inguna Rībena	VIENOTĪBA	JL	Rīga	1956/07/24	11,477
Ints Dālderis	VIENOTĪBA	JL	Rīga	1971/02/10	9,680
Ivans Klementjevs	SC	S	Vidzeme	1960/11/18	8,915
Ivans Ribakovs	SC	S	Latgale	1960/06/29	13,985
Iveta Grigule	ZZS	LZP	Vidzeme	1964/09/30	4,070
Janīna Kursīte-Pakule	VIENOTĪBA	PS	Kurzeme	1952/03/02	6,661
Jānis Ādamsons	SC	S	Vidzeme	1956/11/03	7,689
Jānis Dombrava	NA	VL!	Vidzeme	1988/06/29	2,151
Jānis Dūklavs	ZZS	LZS	Vidzeme	1952/11/24	13,730
Jānis Klauž	ZZS	IND	Latgale	1953/05/06	3,133
Jānis Strazdiņš	ZZS	LZS	Rīga	1941/09/29	2,507
Jānis Tutins	SC	S	Latgale	1966/06/23	12,784
Jānis Urbanovičs	SC	S	Rīga	1959/03/23	59,118
Jānis Vucāns	ZZS	LuV	Kurzeme	1956/02/09	2,936
Juris Silovs	SC	S	Vidzeme	1965/10/26	3,275
Kārlis Šadurskis	VIENOTĪBA	PS	Latgale	1959/10/11	3,712
Kārlis Seržants	ZZS	LZP	Rīga	1959/11/12	4,811
Klāvs Olšteins	VIENOTĪBA	JL	Zemgale	1983/04/12	4,453
Lolita Čigāne	VIENOTĪBA	PS	Rīga	1973/08/18	15,092
Māris Kučinskis	PLL	TP	Vidzeme	1961/11/28	2,744
Mihails Zemļinskis	SC	S	Rīga	1969/12/21	7,314
Ņikita Ņikiforovs	SC	S	Rīga	1983/09/08	6,129
Nikolajs Kabanovs	SC	S	Rīga	1970/09/26	12,400
Ojārs Ēriks Kalniņš	VIENOTĪBA	PS	Rīga	1949/10/22-2021/10/14	10,694
Oskars Zīds	ZZS	LP	Kurzeme	1948/07/28	2,781
Raimonds Rubiks	SC	SLP	Latgale	1963/06/09	8,086
Raimonds Vējonis	ZZS	LZP	Rīga	1966/09/15	6,376
Raivis Dzintars	NA	VL!	Vidzeme	1982/11/25	15,852
Rasma Kārkliņa	VIENOTĪBA	PS	Rīga	1946/06/07	7,541
Rihards Eigims	ZZS	IND	Latgale	1962/05/01	3,465
Rita Strode	PLL	LPP/LC	Latgale	1955/07/26	4,958
Sarmīte Ēlerte	VIENOTĪBA	PS	Zemgale	1957/04/08	12,535
Sergejs Dolgopolovs	SC	S	Rīga	1941/09/03	22,588
Sergejs Fjodorovs	SC	SLP	Latgale	1956/05/30	5,789
Sergejs Mirskis	SC	S	Rīga	1952/01/01	11,869
Silva Bendrāte	VIENOTĪBA	JL	Kurzeme	1956/02/29	4,241
Solvita Āboltiņa	VIENOTĪBA	JL	Kurzeme	1963/02/19	11,758
Staņislavs Šķesters	ZZS	LZS	Latgale	1958/12/17	3,626
Uldis Augulis	ZZS	LZS	Zemgale	1972/03/16	3,554
Valdis Dombrovskis	VIENOTĪBA	JL	Vidzeme	1971/08/05	77,168
Valentīns Grigorjevs	SC	S	Zemgale	1946	2,610
Valērijs Agešins	SC	S	Kurzeme	1972/06/23	7,836
Valērijs Kravcovs	SC	S	Kurzeme	1961/10/14	3,003
Visvaldis Bruno Lācis	NA	VL!	Vidzeme	1924/03/12-2020/04/18	7,699
Vitālijs Orlovs	SC	S	Zemgale	1964/05/30	5,424
Vitauts Staņa	ZZS	LZS	Vidzeme	1955/06/09	2,737
Vladimirs Nikonovs	SC	S	Latgale	1955/04/04	7,224
Source: Overall results - Centrālā vēlēšanu komisija - CVK

== Aftermath ==
Though the result made a variety of coalition options possible, including a coalition government formed by Harmony Centre and The Union of Greens and Farmers, Dombrovskis said that Unity and the Greens and Farmers had agreed to continue working together and form a government, to be approved by parliament on 2 November. For Fatherland and Freedom was also expected to be part of the government. However Dombrovskis also said that he was seeking a cooperation deal with Harmony Centre in a bid to win additional support for further budget cuts. "We offer an opportunity to sign a cooperation agreement with Harmony Center, to agree on cooperation in parliament, maybe, also delegating a minister."
