= For a Good Latvia =

Political party in Latvia

For a Good Latvia Par Labu Latviju!
- Leader: Joint leadership of Andris Šķēle (PP) and Ainārs Šlesers (LPP/LC)
- Founded: 22 April 2010
- Dissolved: 16 October 2011
- Headquarters: Riga
- Ideology: Conservatism; Social conservatism Conservative liberalism
- Political position: Centre-right
- National affiliation: People's Party; Latvia's First Party/Latvian Way
- European affiliation: European People's Party (PP); European Liberal Democrat and Reform Party (LPP/LC)
- European Parliament group: Alliance of Liberals and Democrats for Europe (LPP/LC)
- Colours: Maroon
- Saeima: 0 / 100
- European Parliament: 0 / 8

Website
- http://parlabulatviju.lv/

For a Good Latvia (Latvian: Par Labu Latviju!, also known as (AŠ)²) was a Latvian right-wing party alliance founded on 22 April 2010 by the People's Party, Latvia's First Party/Latvian Way, the businessmen's movement For a Good Latvia and some smaller parties. The initial name (AŠ)² referred to the initials of the party leaders of the People's Party (Andris Šķēle) and LPP/LC (Ainārs Šlesers). Both major parties participating in the alliance had been doing badly in the polls. The alliance was headed by former Latvian president Guntis Ulmanis.

In the 2010 parliamentary election it won a disappointing 8 seats and did not join the governing coalition. In July 2011 the People's Party was dissolved and Ainārs Šlesers' LPP/LC renamed itself the Ainars Šlesers LPP/LC Reform Party, by analogy with the Zatlers' Reform Party. The parliamentary faction of "For a Good Latvia", however, continued to exist until the end of the 10th Saeima and was headed by Edgars Zalāns. In the elections of September 2011, Ainars Šlesers LPP/LC Reform Party failed to win any seats.
