= Juris Silovs =

Juris Silovs may refer to:

- Juris Silovs (athlete) (1950–2018), Soviet sprinter
- Juris Silovs (cyclist) (born 1973), Latvian cyclist
- Juris Silovs (politician), Latvian rugby player, lawyer, and politician
