= Juris Silovs (politician) =

Latvian politician

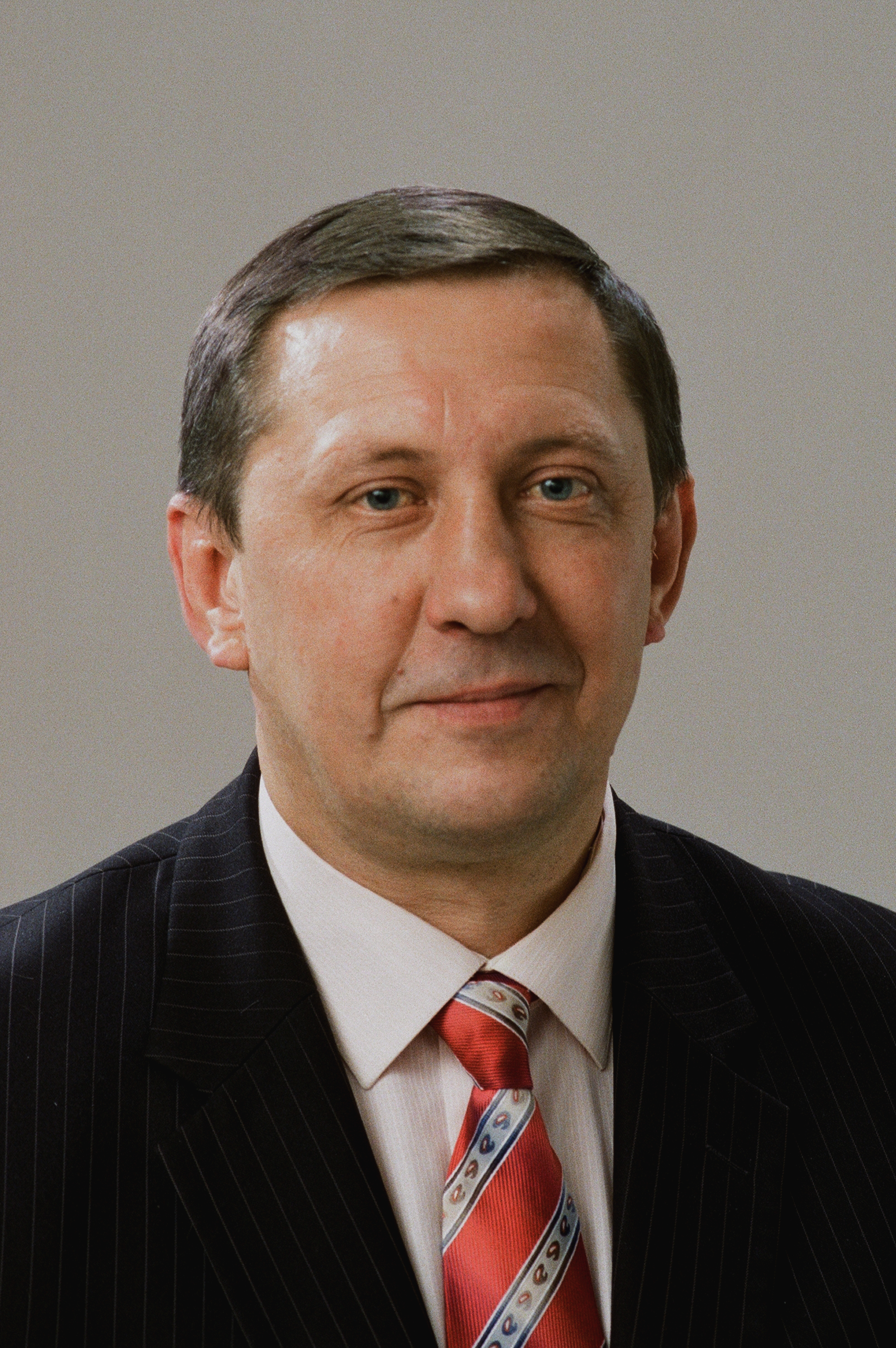
- Juris Silovs in 2010

Member of the Saeima

Personal details
- Born: 26 October 1965 (age 60) Riga, Latvia
- Party: New Centre (until 2010); Harmony (since 2010)
- Education: School of Social Technologies
- Profession: Lawyer

Juris Silovs (born 1965) is a Latvian rugby player, lawyer, and politician. He is a former chairman of the Garkalne Municipal Council and a member of the 10th Saeima. He represented the political party "Harmony" and the coalition "Harmony Centre".

== Biography ==
In 1984, Silovs graduated from Riga's 19th Polytechnic Technical School, obtaining secondary vocational education as a plasterer-tiler.

From 1991 to 2000, Silovs played for the Latvian rugby national team. He was a multiple Latvian champion and cup winner with the Miesnieki rugby club. He also played for the RAF team.

He worked as a senior arms inspector in the defense department of the Bank of Latvia and as a builder for the agrarian company "Ādaži". In 2003, Silovs obtained a law degree from the School of Social Technologies. In 2004, he graduated from the Real Estate Appraisal School of the University of Latvia.

From 2010 to 2013, he served as the president of the Latvian Rugby Federation.

=== Political career ===
In the 2005 Garkalne parish council elections, he was elected to the council from the "New Centre" list. In 2006, he became the chairman of the Garkalne Municipality Council. That same year, he participated in the 9th Saeima elections from the "Harmony Centre" list but was not elected. In the 2009 Garkalne municipal elections, SC won, and Silovs became the chairman of the council again.

In 2010, Silovs ran in the 10th Saeima elections and was elected to the Saeima in the Vidzeme constituency from the "Harmony Centre" list. He served on the Public Administration and Local Government Committee as well as the Economic Committee.

On 14 June 2010, the Latvian Economic Police accused Silovs and his wife of large-scale fraud. Silovs, while still the chairman of the Garkalne Municipality Council, had hidden the traces of an accident he caused while driving a service car under the influence of alcohol and defrauded the insurance company. On 12 April 2011, Silovs resigned his Saeima mandate. On 10 October 2014, the Riga District Court sentenced Silovs to three years in prison, which he appealed, continuing to work in the next Garkalne Municipal Council and retaining the position of Deputy Chairman of the Garkalne Municipal Council. On 4 December 2017, the case was concluded, with the court replacing the prison sentence with a €19,000 fine. Along with the conviction, Silovs lost his position as Deputy Chairman of the Garkalne Municipal Council, which he had obtained after being elected to the Garkalne Municipal Council in the 2013 municipal elections from the "Harmony Centre" list.

In the 2017 Latvian municipal elections, he was re-elected to the Garkalne Municipal Council from the "Harmony" list. In the 2021 municipal elections, he ran for a seat on the Ropaži Municipal Council from the "United for Latvia" list but did not receive enough voter support.
