= Responsibility – Social Democratic Alliance of Political Parties =

Latvian political party

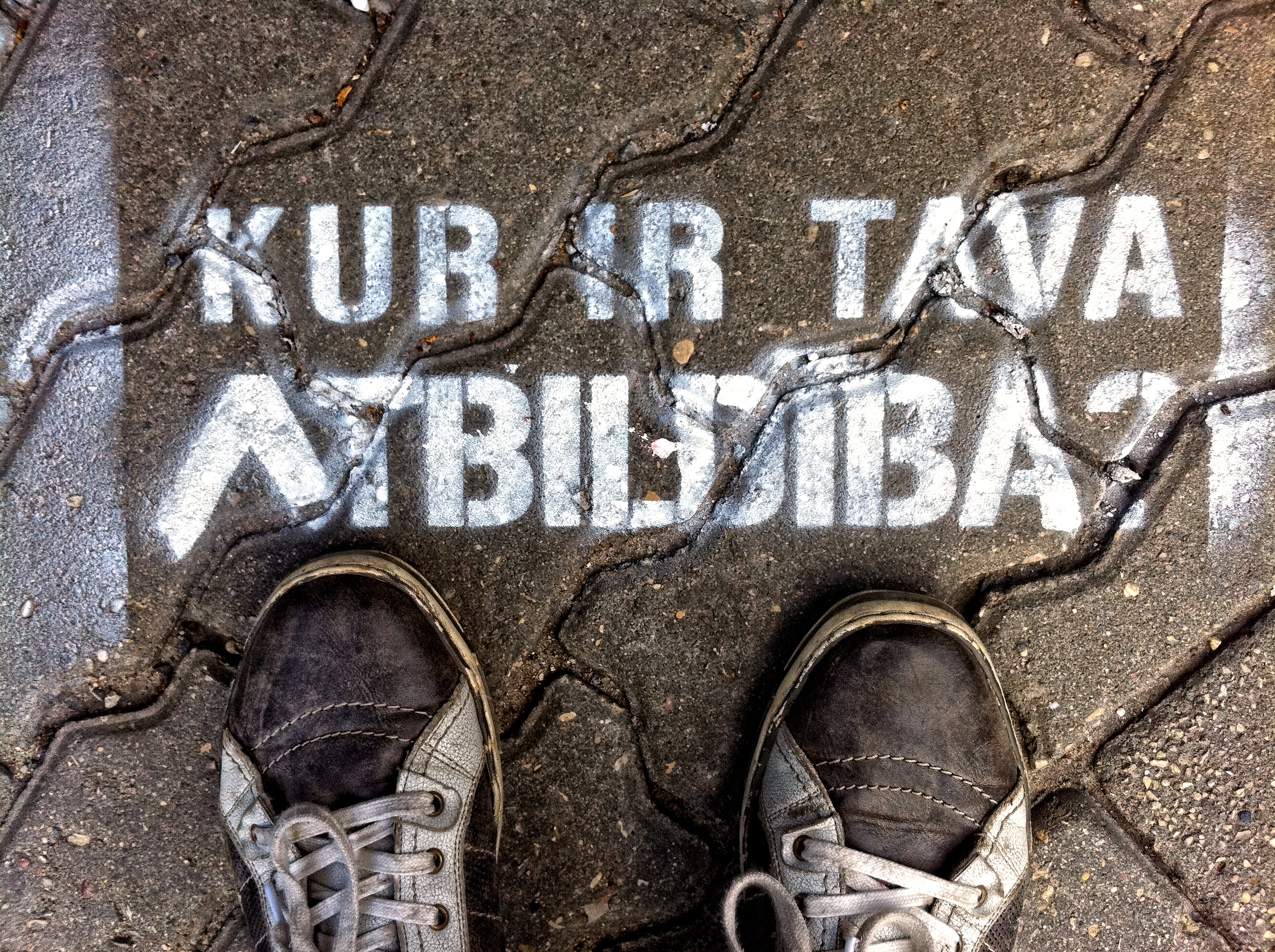
A stencil with the alliance's wordmark on a pavement in Riga: "Where Is Your Responsibility?"

Responsibility – Social Democratic Alliance of Political Parties (Latvian: ATBILDĪBA-sociāldemokrātiska politisko partiju apvienība) was a political coalition in Latvia, until 2010 called Libertas.lv, which was the local branch of Declan Ganley's Libertas Party. Unlike Libertas in other countries, Libertas Latvia was not a political party in its own right. Instead, candidates from Mūsu Zeme, Sociālā Taisnīguma Partija and Latvijas Atmoda (formerly Pensionāru un Senioru Partija) contended the 2009 European Parliament elections in Latvia under common lists branded with the Libertas identity. The candidates retained their membership of their national parties and the national parties retained their legal identity.

The alliance collapsed in late 2010. In October 2020 the dissolution of the alliance was officially started.

== Lauskis's Unity and Justice ==
In 2008, Valdis Lauskis, mayor of Daugavpils from 1991 to 1994, of the Sociālā Taisnīguma Partija registered an alliance called "Vienotība un Taisnīgums" (Unity and Justice), with a registration date of 24 April 2008 and a registration number of 40008127042. The list accrued only nominal income/expenditure during 2008.

== Lauskis's Libertas.lv ==
Instead of creating a new list for Libertas, Lauskis just renamed "Vienotība un Taisnīgums" to "Libertas.lv" instead. The last day of the existence of "Vienotība un Taisnīgums" under that name was 24 March 2009. It became "Libertas.lv" with effect from the next day, 25 March 2009. "Libertas.lv" retained its previous registration number of 40008127042.

On 28 March 2008, the newly created Libertas Latvia gave a press conference in which Guntars Krasts (Prime Minister of Latvia from 7 Aug 1997 to 26 Nov 1998 and former member of For Fatherland and Freedom/LNNK) was introduced as the head of the Libertas Latvia list. The list would total eight candidates to contend the nine seats assigned to the single Latvia constituency. Latvian parties affiliated to Libertas would include Mūsu Zeme (Our Land), Sociālā Taisnīguma Partija (Social Justice Party) and Pensionāru un Senioru Partija (Pensioners and Seniors Party).

The Pensionāru un Senioru partija (Pensioners and Seniors Party) renamed itself to "Latvijas Atmoda" (Latvian Renaissance), registration number 50008102341 with effect from 3 April 2009.

== Responsibility ==
In June, 2010, Libertas.lv, joined by LSDSP was renamed Responsibility. It took part in the 2010 parliamentary elections, obtaining no seats. The alliance folded soon after the elections.

== See also ==
- Jens-Peter Bonde
- Declan Ganley
- 2009 European Parliament election
- Treaty of Lisbon
