= Artis Pabriks =

Latvian politician

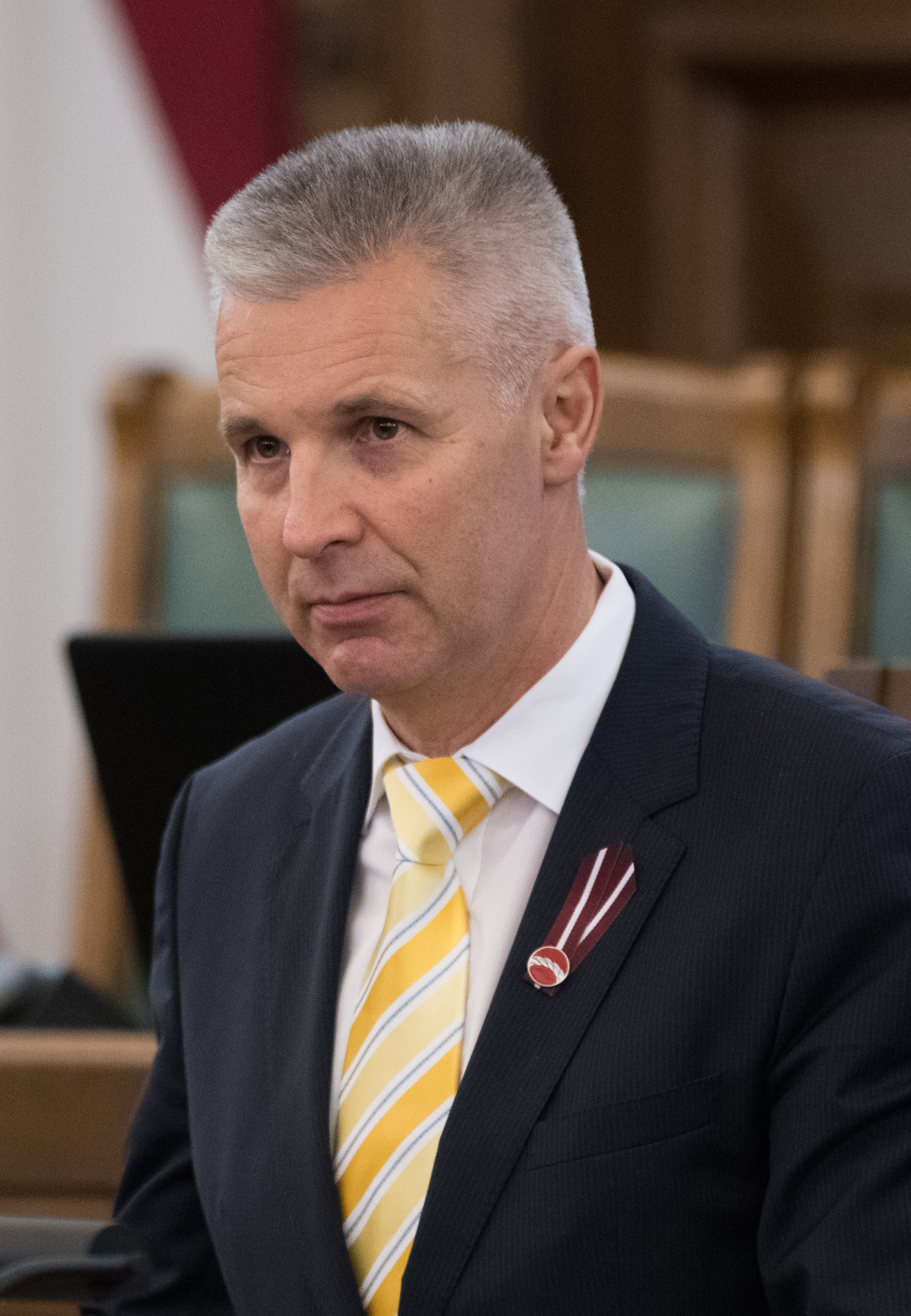
- Pabriks in 2018

Minister of Defence
- In office 23 January 2019 – 14 December 2022
- Prime Minister: Arturs Krišjānis Kariņš
- Preceded by: Raimonds Bergmanis
- Succeeded by: Ināra Mūrniece
- In office 3 November 2010 – 22 January 2014
- Prime Minister: Valdis Dombrovskis
- Preceded by: Imants Lieģis
- Succeeded by: Raimonds Vējonis

Member of the European Parliament for Latvia
- In office 1 July 2014 – 5 November 2018

Minister of Foreign Affairs
- In office 21 July 2004 – 28 October 2007
- Prime Minister: Indulis Emsis; Aigars Kalvītis
- Preceded by: Rihards Pīks
- Succeeded by: Māris Riekstiņš

Personal details
- Born: 22 March 1966 (age 60) Jūrmala, Latvian SSR, Soviet Union
- Party: People's Party (1998–2007); Society for Political Change (2008–2011); Unity (2011–2018); For Latvia's Development (2019–present)
- Other political affiliations: Development/For! (2018–present)
- Education: Aarhus University; University of Latvia
- Website: www.artispabriks.lv

Artis Pabriks (born 22 March 1966) is a Latvian politician. Since January 2019 he has been the Minister for Defence and Deputy Prime Minister of Latvia. From 2014 to 2018, he was a Member of the European Parliament.

== Early life and career ==
After completing his mandatory two-year stint in the Soviet Army, Pabriks obtained a degree in history from the University of Latvia in 1992 and, on a Danish-financed grant, completed his Ph.D. in political science from the University of Aarhus in 1996.

After finishing his Ph.D. on minorities in Europe, he became the rector of the Vidzeme University of Applied Sciences, a newly founded regional college located in Valmiera. He has co-authored one book: Latvia: Challenge of Change (2001), which was subsequently re-published together with volumes on Lithuania and Estonia under the title The Baltic States: Estonia, Latvia and Lithuania (2002). Both were published by Routledge.

== Political career ==
Pabriks was one of the founding members of the People's Party in 1998 and became a member of the Saeima in March 2004. He served as chairman of the Foreign Affairs Commission.

=== Minister of Foreign Affairs, 2004–2007 ===
Pabriks was appointed Minister of Foreign Affairs on 21 July 2004. He resigned from his position in October 2007 due to disagreements with the leadership of the People's Party, which he subsequently left.

=== Return to private life 2008-2010 ===
In September 2008, Pabriks was one of founding members of the Society for Political Change. He was a visiting professor at Boğaziçi University in Istanbul lecturing for the first semester of the 2009-2010 academic year.

=== Minister of Defence, 2010–2014 ===
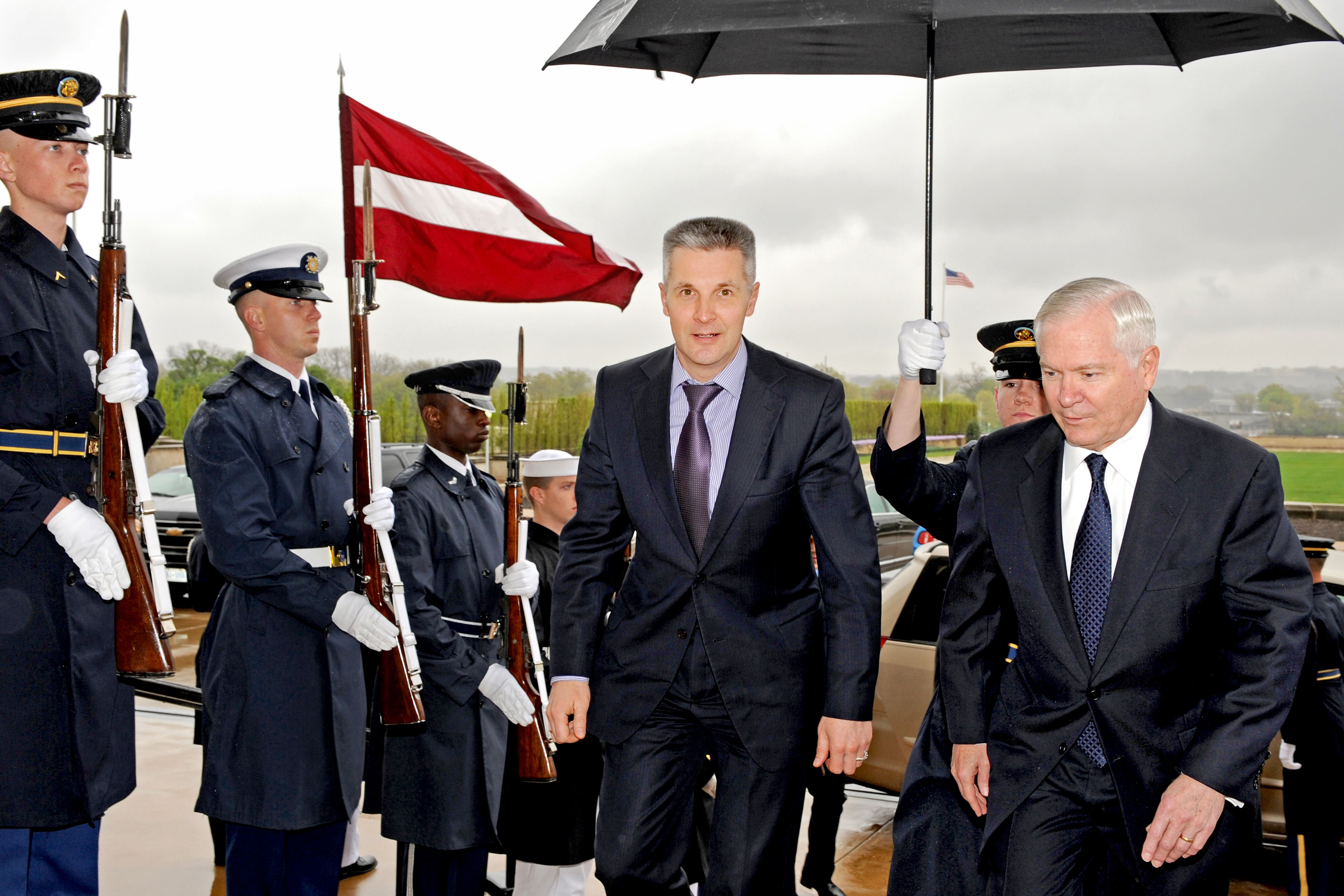
In April 2011, Pabriks met with U.S. Defense Secretary Robert Gates at the Pentagon.

After the 2010 parliamentary election, Pabriks re-entered the government as the Minister of Defence.

In 2010 Pabriks challenged the incumbent general secretary of the Parliamentary Assembly of the Organization for Security and Co-operation in Europe, Spencer Oliver for his position. Pabriks, supported by the Latvian delegation, called the OSCE Parliamentary Assembly’s rules "quite shocking from the perspective of an organization that's monitoring elections". It would have required a full consensus minus one to oust Oliver who has been in the position of general secretary since the organization’s inception in 1992. Pabriks was unsuccessful in his challenge.

In early 2014, Pabriks was Unity’s first nominee to replace incumbent Prime Minister Valdis Dombrovskis; however, he was rejected by President Andris Bērziņš who argued that he lacked economic credentials. Instead, the position went to Laimdota Straujuma.

=== Member of the European Parliament, 2014–2018 ===
Pabriks was elected to the European Parliament at the European election in 2014. He has since been serving on the Committee on International Trade. In this capacity, he is the Parliament’s chief rapporteur on EU-Canada trade agreement CETA. In addition to his committee assignments, he is a member of the Parliament’s delegations to the Euro-Latin American Parliamentary Assembly and for relations with the countries of Central America.

In 2015, news media reported that Pabriks was included in a Russian blacklist of prominent people from the European Union who are not allowed to enter the country.

In 2016, Pabriks was the Parliament’s lead negotiator on a proposal to set up a new EU border force and coast guard.

=== Leader of Development/For! since 2018 ===
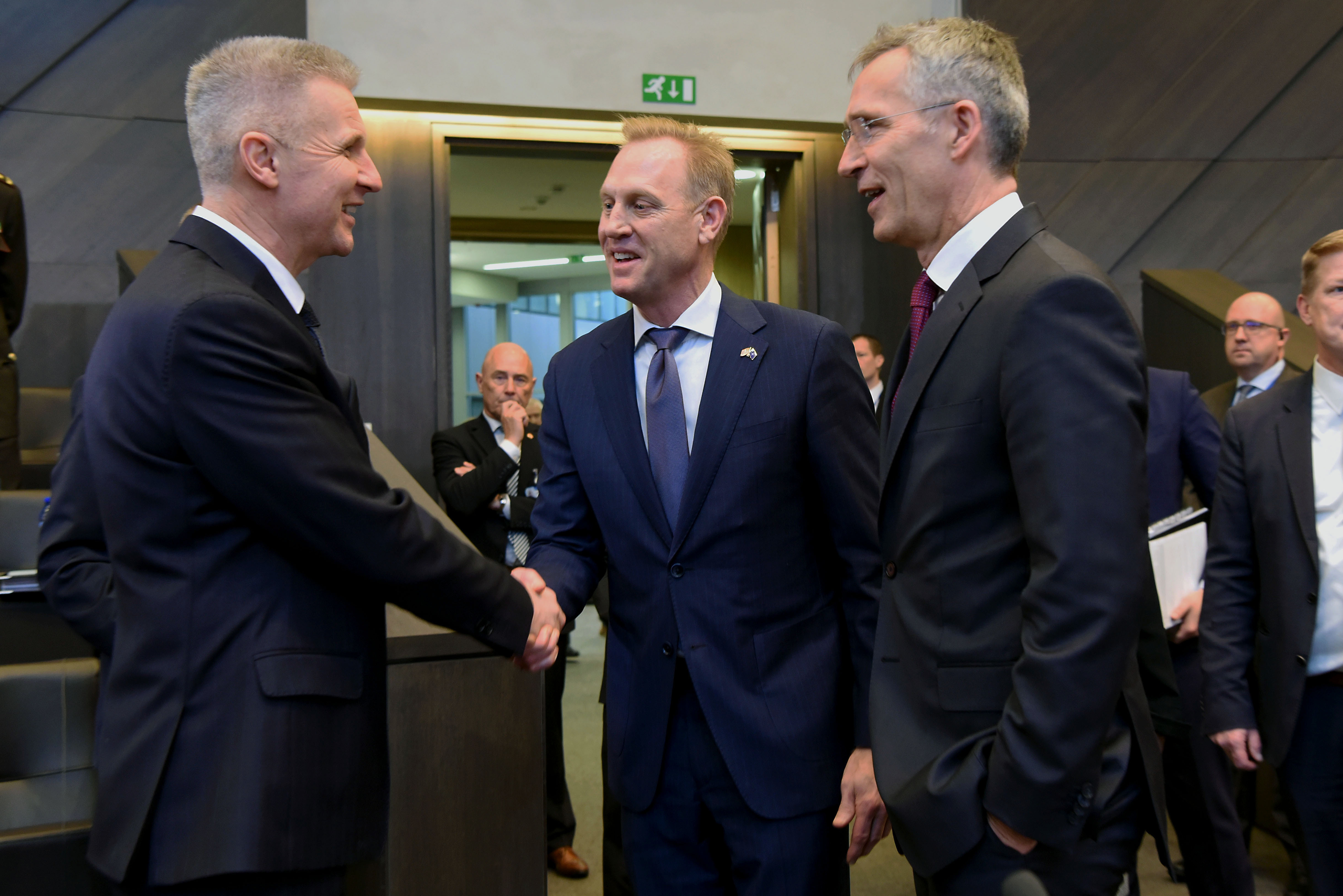
In February 2019, Pabriks greets U.S. Acting Defense Secretary Patrick Shanahan and NATO Secretary General Jens Stoltenberg in Brussels.

In June 2018 Pabriks left the Unity party and joined the liberal movement Development/For!. He was nominated as the prime ministerial candidate of this electoral alliance and was elected member of the Saeima in the 2018 parliamentary election.

=== Defence Minister (2019-2022) ===
Between January 2019 and 14 December 2022 he was the Minister for Defence and Deputy Prime Minister of Latvia in the First Kariņš cabinet.

== Other activities ==
- Baltic Review, Member of the Editorial Board (since 2002)

== Personal life ==
Pabriks has a daughter from a previous marriage and two children from his wife Undine, an ethnic German.

Pabriks speaks fluent Latvian, Russian, and English, as well as some German and Danish.
