= Imants Lieģis =

Latvian diplomat and politician

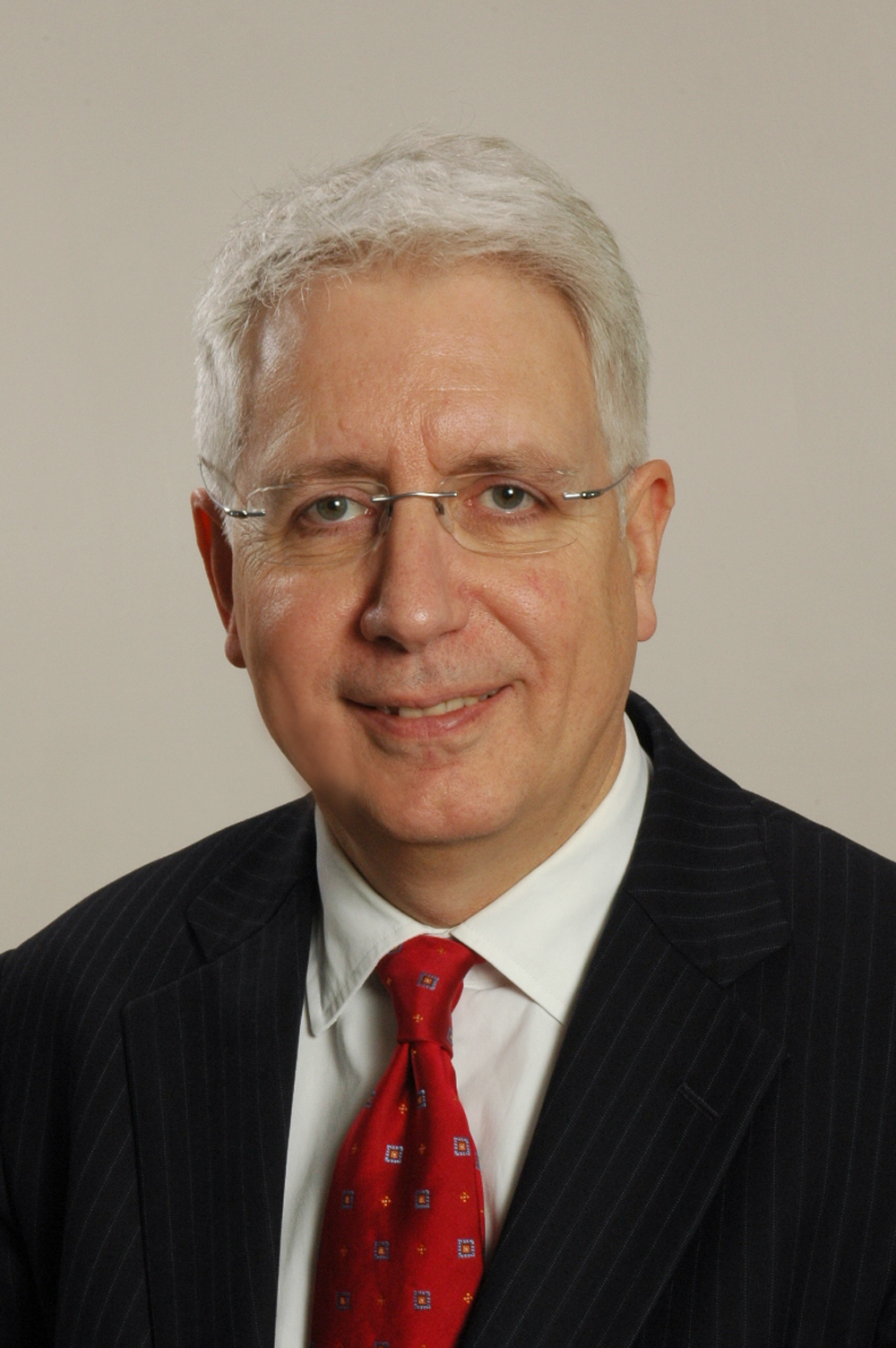

Minister of Defence
- In office 12 March 2009 – 3 November 2010
- Prime Minister: Valdis Dombrovskis
- Preceded by: Vinets Veldre
- Succeeded by: Artis Pabriks

Personal details
- Born: 30 April 1955 (age 71) Meriden, England, UK
- Party: The Progressives; previously Civic Union
- Education: Newcastle University

Imants Viesturs Lieģis (born 30 April 1955) is a Latvian diplomat and politician. Since 2016, he has served as Latvia's ambassador extraordinary and plenipotentiary to France, as well as non-resident ambassador to Algeria, Morocco and Monaco.

He served as Latvia's defence minister from 2009 to 2010. Lieģis was appointed to the defence ministry post in March 2009, as part of the new six-party coalition government headed by Valdis Dombrovskis. In 2010, he joined the Civic Union party and was elected to the Parliament, he was Chairman of the European Affairs Committee and Chairman of Delegation to the NATO PA until October 2011.

He is a board member of the European Leadership Network.

A career diplomat, Lieģis served previously as Latvia's ambassador to NATO, a post to which he was appointed in 1997 while also serving as ambassador to the Benelux countries. Ambassador to the Kingdom of Spain from September 2008 to March 2009. Ambassador to Hungary from 2012 to 2016.

He was born in the United Kingdom. Trained in law, Lieģis worked as a solicitor in the Supreme Court of England and Wales from 1979 to 1991.

He is a Senior Network Member at the European Leadership Network (ELN).
