= Society for Political Change =

Latvian political party

Society for Political Change Sabiedrība citai politikai
- Leader: Aigars Štokenbergs
- Founded: 6 September 2008
- Dissolved: 6 August 2011
- Split from: People's Party
- Merged into: Unity
- Headquarters: 8 Audēju street, Riga
- Ideology: Social liberalism
- Political position: Centre-left
- Colours: Red

Website
- http://www.scp.lv/

The Society for Political Change (Latvian: Sabiedrība citai politikai, SCP) was a social-liberal political party in Latvia founded on 6 September 2008. Its members include two former ministers, former foreign minister Artis Pabriks and former economics minister Aigars Štokenbergs; its first president was economist Gatis Kokins.

The SCP ran as part of the Unity rainbow alliance in the 2010 Latvian parliamentary election to the Saeima. The party won six seats, out of the list's total of 33. After the election, the SCP demanded that the right-wing National Alliance, which includes previous coalition partners For Fatherland and Freedom/LNNK, be excluded from the new government, which included Unity and the Union of Greens and Farmers.

On 6 March 2011, it voted to merge with New Era Party and Civic Union to form the new political party Unity.
