= 2011 Latvian parliamentary election =

Parliamentary election held in Latvia

- 17 September 2011
Party	Leader	Vote %	Seats	+/–
Harmony Centre	Jānis Urbanovičs	28.62	31	+2
Reform	Valdis Zatlers	21.01	22	New
Unity	Valdis Dombrovskis	19.00	20	−13
NA	Raivis Dzintars	14.01	14	+6
ZZS	Raimonds Vējonis	12.33	13	−9
This lists parties that won seats. See the complete results below.
Results by electoral district and municipality
Prime Minister before	Prime Minister after
Valdis Dombrovskis; Unity	Valdis Dombrovskis; Unity

Early parliamentary elections were held in Latvia on 17 September 2011, following the country's first parliamentary dissolution referendum held on 23 July 2011. The previous parliamentary election was only held in October 2010.

The elections resulted in Harmony Centre winning the most seats, up two to 31. This was the first time a pro-Russian party had won the most seats in a Latvian election. Unity, previously the largest party, fell to third, with 20 seats, behind the newly formed Zatlers' Reform Party, led by ex-President Valdis Zatlers, who had triggered the dissolution referendum in May. The right-wing National Alliance gained six seats to 14. Both the Union of Greens and Farmers and Latvia's First Party/Latvian Way lost heavily, with the latter falling out of the Saeima altogether.

Zatlers and incumbent Prime Minister Valdis Dombrovskis soon agreed to form a coalition. Needing nine further seats to give them a majority allowed three possible coalitions – with Harmony Centre, the National Alliance, or the Union of Greens and Farmers. The Greens and Farmers were quickly ruled out by Zatlers, who judged it to be an "oligarch's party". After initial talks with the National Alliance, the two briefly discussed a grand coalition with Harmony Centre. However, Zatlers and Unity returned to the National Alliance, and the three signed a coalition agreement on 11 October, with Dombrovskis as Prime Minister. The new government was confirmed by the Saeima on 25 October. A few days before the government formation, six MPs split from Zatlers' Reform Party; they still supported the new government, however.

== Background ==
Prior to the elections, a number of changes in Latvia's party system occurred:

- The Social Democratic Party "Harmony" absorbed Daugavpils City Party.
- The People's Party dissolved itself amid high debts and quickly sinking popularity.
- For Fatherland and Freedom/LNNK and All For Latvia! turned their election alliance National Alliance into a joint party.
- The New Era Party, Civic Union and Society for Other Politics turned their election alliance Unity into a joint party.
- Former president Valdis Zatlers (responsible for the referendum) founded Zatlers' Reform Party, which is enjoying great popularity in election polls. Zatlers' stated goal is to remove the influence of oligarchs on Latvian politics; with the dissolution of the People's Party, the parties Zatlers considers to represent oligarchs are the Union of Greens and Farmers and Latvia's First Party/Latvian Way.

== Results ==
The Harmony Centre party, led by Nils Ušakovs, finished with about 29% of the vote, followed by Zatlers' Reform Party with 21% and the Unity party with 18%. The National Alliance and the Union of Greens and Farmers were the only other parties to enter Parliament, with fourteen and twelve percent of the vote, respectively. Harmony Centre's victory was the first for a pro-Russian party since Latvia's independence; the party has ties to United Russia.

Party	Votes	%	Seats	+/–
Harmony Centre	259,930	28.62	31	+2
Zatlers' Reform Party	190,856	21.01	22	New
Unity	172,563	19.00	20	−13
National Alliance	127,208	14.01	14	+6
Union of Greens and Farmers	111,957	12.33	13	–9
Latvia's First Party/Latvian Way	22,131	2.44	0	–8
For Human Rights in United Latvia	7,109	0.78	0	0
Last Party	4,471	0.49	0	0
For a Presidential Republic	2,881	0.32	0	0
People's Control	2,573	0.28	0	0
Latvian Social Democratic Workers' Party	2,531	0.28	0	0
Freedom. Free from Fear, Hate and Anger	2,011	0.22	0	New
Christian Democratic Union	1,993	0.22	0	0
Total	908,214	100.00	100	0
Valid votes	908,214	99.10		
Invalid/blank votes	8,255	0.90		
Total votes	916,469	100.00		
Registered voters/turnout	1,542,700	59.41		
Source: CVK, CVK, CVK

== Government formation ==
Despite winning the most seats, Harmony Centre, was unable to come to an agreement to form a coalition that would hold a majority in parliament immediately after the election. Usakovs entered talks with Zatlers Reform Party and Unity following the election with the aim of forming a coalition, though political analysts said that a potential stumbling block in the talks could be the opposition of other parties to Harmony Centre's connection to Latvia's Russian-speaking population. The most likely potential coalition was predicted to be Zatlers' Reform Party, Unity and National Alliance. Valdis Dombrovskis was believed to remain Prime Minister, despite his party finishing behind the Reform Party.

Zatlers stated on 1 October 2011 that he preferred a coalition with Dombrovskis as PM and including Harmony Centre. However, on 10 October 2011, reports indicated a coalition with the National Alliance was all but certain. Eventually a Unity-Reform Party-National Alliance coalition was formed.
