= Vidzeme University of Applied Sciences =

University in Valmiera, Latvia

- Vidzemes Augstskola
- Type: Public
- Established: 1996; 30 years ago
- Rector: Agnese Dāvidsone
- Academic staff: 53
- Administrative staff: 55
- Students: 850 (2016)
- Undergraduates: 952
- Postgraduates: 123
- Doctoral students: 3
- Location: Valmiera, Latvia; 57°32′06″N 25°25′26″E
- Website: www.va.lv/en

Vidzeme University of Applied Sciences (Latvian: Vidzemes Augstskola) is the higher education establishment in Valmiera, Latvia. It was founded in 1996 and now it has around 800 students.

== History ==
Vidzeme University of Applied Sciences was founded in 1996 to promote economic, political and social development of the area. In 2001 it changed its status from a regional governmental institution to a state educational institution. Later in 2004 it introduced two master's degree study programmes. In October 2013 it received the Green Flag award, becoming the first institution of higher education in the Baltic states to hold international Eco university status. In February 2014, the Faculty of Business Administration and Economics, Faculty of Tourism and Hospitality Management, and Faculty of Social Sciences were merged into one faculty.

== Structure ==
Vidzeme University of Applied Sciences has an elected rector, currently Agnese Dāvidsone. The university has two faculties, two research centres, The Lifelong Learning Centre and a library.

=== Faculty of Engineering ===
Currently this faculty is the only one at the university that offers a study programme for students who wish to obtain a Ph.D. degree. In 2011 a study programme titled 'Wooden Houses and Eco-building' was introduced to train professionals working in the construction area to follow and respect ‘green’ thinking. Later in September 2014 the university plans to open a modern complex of engineering studies, which will be equipped with the latest laboratory and research facilities and technologies.

=== Faculty of Society and Science ===
As this faculty was created by merging faculties of three different disciplines, it provides study programmes related to tourism, business administration and social science. The university decided to put more emphasis on innovations in public administration and tourism and to attract foreign students. For these reasons, the Political Science programme was transformed into Innovations and Governance.

=== Sociotechnical Systems Engineering Institute ===
The Socio-technical Systems Engineering Institute was founded in July 2006. Later the Logistics Information Systems and RFID laboratory was created for joint professional and academic research. The institute publishes international annual Proceedings of scientific articles "ICTE in Regional Development" involved in EBSCO databases.

=== Institute of Social, Economic and Humanities Research ===
It was founded in September, 2013. Scholars at this institute conduct research sustainable development of economics, science communication, the social security system in Latvia, development of nature and culture protected areas, regional development and cultural space and cultural identity in a place development.

== Projects ==
A complete list of research projects may be found on the university's website. However, some of these projects at Vidzeme University of Applied Sciences include:

- ERDF project "Innovative Business Motivation Programme", training course "Become Entrepreneur in 5 days"
- Erasmus Intensive Programme: "International Summer School for Sustainable Tourism"
- Nordplus Higher Education project "Express Mobility for Tourism Students"
- European Social Fund project "Training of Unemployed and Job Seekers in Latvia - 2"
- European Social Fund project "Lifelong Learning Activities for Employees"

== International cooperation ==
Currently Vidzeme University of Applied Sciences participates in two student exchange programmes: Erasmus and Nordplus. Exchange and visiting students can also apply for a Latvian Government scholarship for a study or research period in Latvia. Since 1999 it also organizes a traditional summer programme called The Baltic International Summer School where foreign students get educated about issues concerning the Baltics. Later in 2014 the university together with Klaipeda University will launch of new joint master's programme in International Tourism Events Management.

Vidzeme University of Applied Sciences has cooperation agreements with more than 94 universities. Some of these include:

- (Austria) Leopold-Franzens-Universitat Innsbruck
- (Belgium) Ghent University
- (Denmark) Aalborg University
- (Estonia) Tallinn University
- (Estonia) University of Tartu
- University of Eastern Finland
- (France) University of Strasbourg
- (Georgia (country)) Ilia State University
- (Germany) Humboldt-Universitat zu Berlin
- (Iceland) University of Akureyri
- (Italy) University of Pisa
- Kazakhstan Institute of Management, Economics and Strategic Research
- (Kyrgyzstan) American University of Central Asia
- (Netherlands) The Hague University of Applied Sciences
- (Portugal) Universidade do Porto
- (Sweden) Karlstad University
- (Sweden) Linnaeus University
- (Turkey) Istanbul University

== People ==
The first rector of Vidzeme University of Applied Sciences was Artis Pabriks, former Minister for Defence of Latvia.
