= Latvia's First Party/Latvian Way =

Latvian political party

Latvia's First Party/Latvian Way Latvijas Pirmā partija/Latvijas Ceļš
- Leader: Ainārs Šlesers
- Founded: 25 August 2007
- Dissolved: 1 December 2011
- Merger of: Latvia's First Party; Latvian Way
- Headquarters: Riga
- Ideology: Conservative liberalism Social conservatism
- Political position: Centre-right
- European affiliation: European Liberal Democrat and Reform Party
- European Parliament group: Alliance of Liberals and Democrats for Europe
- International affiliation: Liberal International
- Colours: Purple

Website
- www.lpplc.lv

Latvia's First Party/Latvian Way (Latvian: Latvijas Pirmā partija/Latvijas Ceļš, LPP/LC) was a conservative-liberal political party in Latvia created from the merger of the Christian-democratic Latvia's First Party (LPP), the liberal Latvian Way (LC) and the regionalist We for our District and Vidzeme Union in 2007. These parties had already formed an electoral coalition in 2006. The unified party was led by Ainārs Šlesers, the former LPP chairman. It was dissolved in December 2011.

In the 2009 European Parliament election, the party won a single MEP Ivars Godmanis. At the 2010 election, the party ran as part of For a Good Latvia with the People's Party. LPP/LC won three of the alliance's eight seats. After the People's Party's dissolution in 2011, the party renamed itself the Šlesers LPP/LC Reform Party and ran alone in the 2011 election, but won only 2.4% of the vote: failing to cross the 5% electoral threshold, and so lost all of its seats. The party then had its name reverted to LPP/LC. At the end of 2011, the party congress decided to disband the party.

Before its liquidation, the LPP/LC party received a fine of 528,870 Lats (more that 700 000 EUR) for illegal donations and exceeding the campaign limit. The party was liquidated and the fine was never paid.
