= Aigars Štokenbergs =

Latvian politician (born 1963)

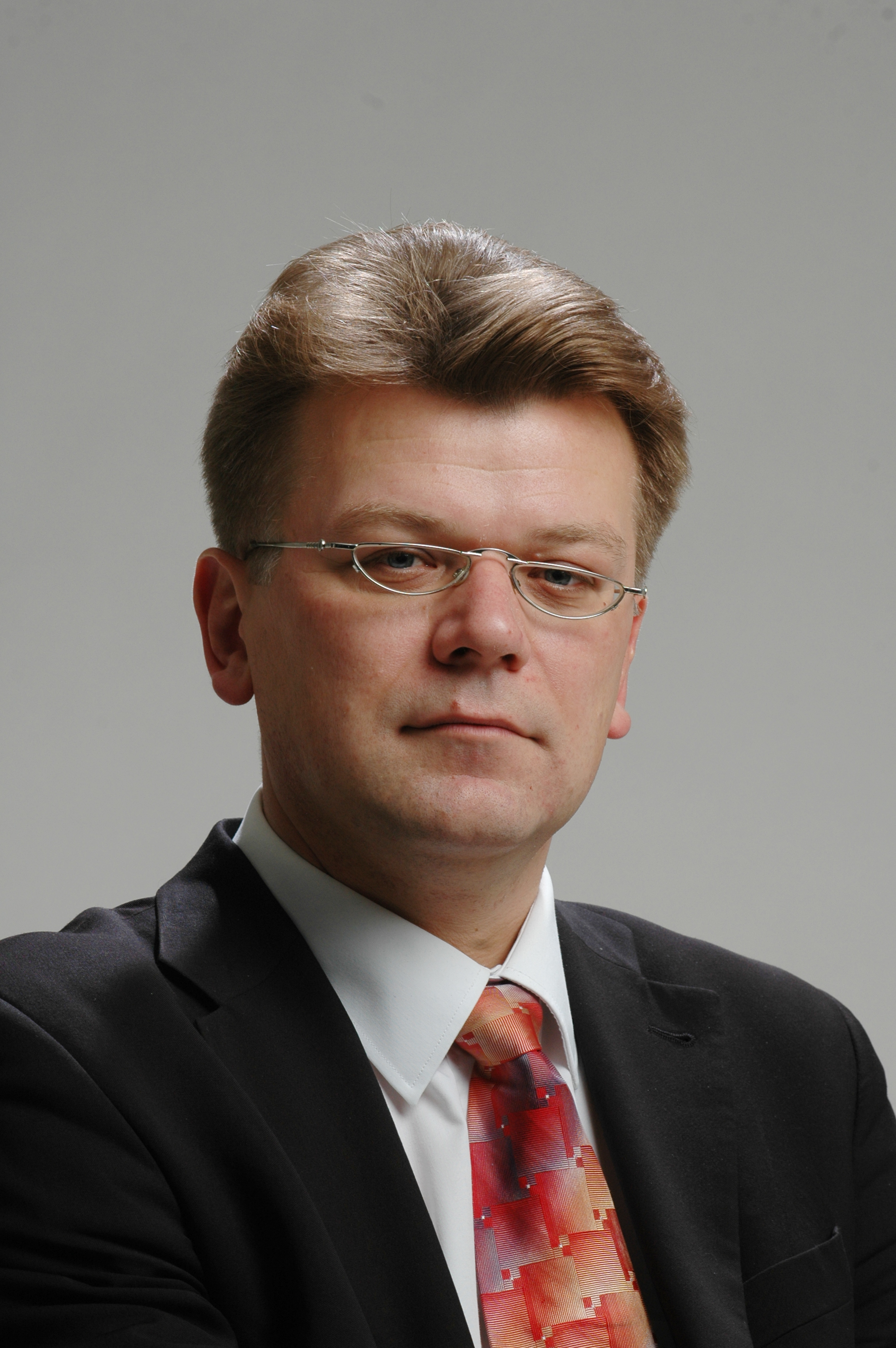
Aigars Štokenbergs

Aigars Štokenbergs (born 29 August 1963 in Riga, Latvian SSR) is a Latvian politician from the Society for Other Politics party who served as the Minister of Justice from 3 November 2010 to 25 October 2011. Štokenbergs has also been Minister of Economics of Latvia from 8 April to 7 November 2006, and Minister of Regional Development and Local Governments of Latvia from 7 November 2006 to 19 October 2007.
