= Reform Party (Latvia) =

Former Latvian political party

Reform Party Reformu partija
- Leader: Vjačeslavs Dombrovskis
- Founded: 23 July 2011
- Dissolved: 2015
- Headquarters: Stabu iela 17 Riga LV-1011
- Ideology: Liberal conservatism
- Political position: Centre-right
- Colours: Turquoise, crimson

Website
- www.reformupartija.lv

The Reform Party (Latvian: Reformu partija), formerly known as Zatlers' Reform Party (Latvian: Zatlera Reformu partija, ZRP) until April 2012, was a centre-right political party in Latvia founded by former President Valdis Zatlers on 23 July 2011. It won 22 seats in the Saeima in the 2011 election.

== History ==
On 9 July 2011, Zatlers announced that he would found the party on 23 July 2011; the same day as the country's first parliamentary dissolution referendum. The party was founded on 23 July and Zatlers was elected its chairman by 251 votes to 2. Zatlers announced that the party would not cooperate with the three 'oligarch' parties – the Union of Greens and Farmers, Latvia's First Party/Latvian Way, and the People's Party.

A survey suggested that 33% of voters would support the new party, and as of July 2011, 17.5% would vote for them, while 52% were certain that the party would receive seats in the Saeima.

By September 2011, over 1000 people had applied to join the party. As of 19 July 2011 the core of the party was formed by 15–20 members. The party drafted 10 working principles, and invited discussion on these principles from anyone who applied for membership.

At the 2011 parliamentary election, the party won 22 seats, making it the second-largest party, behind the Harmony Centre alliance. It agreed to form a coalition with Unity, and after negotiations, the National Alliance, with Valdis Dombrovskis to continue as Prime Minister and Zatlers to be Speaker of the Saeima. On 17 October 2011, Zatlers failed to be elected Speaker as had been agreed, and Unity's Solvita Āboltiņa was re-elected instead. Six ZRP MPs – Klāvs Olšteins, Elīna Siliņa, Gunārs Rusiņš, Jānis Upenieks, Viktors Valainis, and Jānis Junkurs – left the party to become non-attached members.

In April 2012 the party dropped references to its founder from its name and became known simply as the Reform Party.

For the 2014 general election, the Reform Party announced an electoral pact with its government coalition partner Unity.

In March 2015 the party began the formal process of disbanding and most of its core base was absorbed by Unity. The liquidation process concluded in April 2020.

== Election results ==
=== Parliament (Saeima) ===
Election year	# of overall votes	% of overall vote	# of overall seats won	+/–
2011	190,853	20.8	22 / 100	
