= Unity (Latvia) =

Political party in Latvia

Unity Vienotība
- Leader: Edmunds Jurēvics
- General Secretary: Artis Kampars
- Founder: Valdis Dombrovskis
- Founded: 6 March 2010; 16 years ago (electoral alliance); 6 August 2011; 15 years ago (party)
- Merger of: New Era Party; Civic Union; Society for Political Change
- Headquarters: Zigfrīds Anna Meierovics Boulevard 12-3, Riga LV-1050
- Youth wing: Vienotības Jaunatnes organizācija
- Membership (2017): 2,397
- Ideology: Liberal conservatism
- Political position: Centre-right
- National affiliation: New Unity
- European affiliation: European People's Party
- European Parliament group: European People's Party Group
- Colours: Green
- Saeima: 23 / 100
- European Parliament: 2 / 9
- Riga City Council: 9 / 60
- Mayors: 3 / 43

Website
- vienotiba.lv

Unity (Latvian: Vienotība, V) is a liberal-conservative political party in Latvia. It is a member of the New Unity alliance and is positioned on the centre-right on the political spectrum. Since 2025, its chairman of the Main Board has been Edmunds Jurēvics, who succeeded the former Arvils Ašeradens.

It was formed in 2010 as an electoral alliance, and in 2011 was registered as a political party. It was the leading party in Valdis Dombrovskis and Laimdota Straujuma's cabinets from its inception in 2010 until February 2016. Since its foundation, the party has taken part in all of the country's coalition governments, and has been a member of the incumbent coalition government since January 2019, with its member Evika Siliņa as Prime Minister of Latvia. Unity is a member of the European People's Party (EPP).

== History ==
=== Origins, governing, and coalition party (2010–2018) ===
The party was founded as an electoral alliance of the New Era Party, Civic Union, and the Society for Political Change on 6 March 2010. It was reportedly founded in a bid to form a counterweight to the left-wing Harmony Centre alliance, which had been strengthening in polls and elections, while the other right-wing parties (People's Party, For Fatherland and Freedom/LNNK and LPP/LC) were below the electoral threshold of 5%.

The alliance, led by incumbent Prime Minister Valdis Dombrovskis from New Era, achieved a victory in the 2010 parliamentary election, despite the austerity measures enacted by his cabinet during the Great Recession of the late 2000s. Unity led the coalition with ZZS as junior partner until 2011.

On 6 August 2011 the alliance was transformed into a single political party. In the 2011 snap elections, the party came in third, but held on to the PM post in a coalition with the Zatlers' Reform Party and the National Alliance.

After five years in office, Valdis Dombrovskis resigned as PM after the Zolitūde tragedy in early 2014. He was succeeded by party colleague Laimdota Straujuma, who brought ZZS back into her coalition. For the 2014 general election, Unity announced an electoral pact with the Reform Party, which was later followed by a full absorption in March 2015. The party improved on its previous result, coming in second at the polls and gaining 3 extra seats.

The second Straujuma cabinet lasted only for about a year. After the demise of the Straujuma cabinet in late 2015, the party suffered from internal conflicts (e.g. the polarising actions and statements of then party board chair Solvita Āboltiņa) and defections of MPs to other political parties, undermining its ratings. Nevertheless, it remained as the largest parliamentary party in the ZZS-led Kučinskis cabinet and it held 5 ministerial portfolios from early 2016 to 2018.

=== New Unity alliance and Kariņš government (2018–2023) ===
After the October 2018 parliamentary elections, New Unity – an alliance formed in April between Unity and five regional parties – became the smallest faction in the parliament with 8 seats out of 100. The subsequent failure of the candidates for PM from the New Conservative Party and KPV LV to form a government by early January 2019 urged the President of Latvia, Raimonds Vējonis, to offer the opportunity to JV's candidate, former MEP Krišjānis Kariņš. The First Kariņš cabinet consisting of JV, the New Conservatives, KPV LV, Development/For! (AP!), the National Alliance was approved by the Saeima on 23 January 2019. Some of the main issues that the cabinet had to face were the COVID-19 pandemic and the start of the full-scale Russian invasion of Ukraine.

New Unity won the 2022 parliamentary election, gaining 18 more seats. Afterwards, the second Kariņš cabinet was formed, with the United List replacing KPV LV, AP! and the New Conservatives which had to leave parliament. The First Kariņš cabinet is so far the only government in democratic Latvian history to serve a full term of the parliament. Kariņš resigned as Prime Minister in September 2023 as he wanted to expand the coalition to include ZZS and The Progressives in contrary to the wishes of coalition partners.

=== Siliņa government (since 2023) ===
Kariņš was succeeded by fellow party member and then–Minister for Welfare Evika Siliņa, with Kariņš becoming the Minister of Foreign Affairs. Her cabinet consists of JV, ZZS and The Progressives. Kariņš served as minister in the government until March 2024, when he stepped down due to a spending probe into his excessive use of private flights as Prime Minister and returned to being a Saeima MP. Nevertheless, he joined EU Commissioner Valdis Dombrovskis and MEP Sandra Kalniete as one of the front-runners of the party at the upcoming 2024 European Parliament election.

== Election results ==
=== Legislative elections ===
Election	Leader	Performance					Rank	Government
Election	Leader	Votes	%	± pp	Seats	+/–	Rank	Government
2010	Valdis Dombrovskis	301,429	31.90	New	33 / 100	New	1st	Coalition
2011	Valdis Dombrovskis	172,563	19.00	▼12.90	20 / 100	▼13	▼3rd	Coalition
2014	Laimdota Straujuma	199,535	22.01	▲3.01	23 / 100	▲3	▲2nd	Coalition
2018 (Note: The New Unity list won 8 seats; 7 went to Unity and 1 to the Latgale Party)	Krišjānis Kariņš	56,542	6.74	▼15.27	7 / 100	▼16	▼7th	Coalition
2022 (Note: The New Unity list won 26 seats; 23 went to Unity, 1 to For Kuldīga Municipality, 1 to For Valmiera and Vidzeme and 1 to an independent)	Krišjānis Kariņš	173,425	19.19	▲12.45	23 / 100	▲16	▲1st	Coalition
2026 (Note: The New Unity list won 7 seats; 6 went to Unity and 1 to For Kuldīga Municipality)	Edmunds Jurēvics	51,183	6.45	▼12.74	6 / 100	▼17	▼7th	Opposition

=== European Parliament elections ===
Election	List leader	Votes	%	Seats	+/–	EP Group
2014	Valdis Dombrovskis	204,979	46.56 (#1)	4 / 8	New	EPP
2019 (Note: The New Unity list won 2 seats, both of which went to Unity)	Valdis Dombrovskis	124,193	26.40 (#1)	2 / 8	▼2	EPP
2024	Valdis Dombrovskis	130,563	25.37 (#1)	2 / 9	0	EPP

== Symbols and logos ==
Old logo

== See also ==
- List of political parties in Latvia
- Category:New Unity politicians
