= New Era Party =

Latvian political party

New Era Party Jaunais laiks
- Leader: Valdis Dombrovskis
- Founded: 2 February 2002
- Dissolved: 6 August 2011
- Merged into: Unity
- Headquarters: Riga
- Ideology: Liberal conservatism Economic liberalism Anti-corruption
- Political position: Centre-right
- European affiliation: European People's Party (2002–2011)
- European Parliament group: European People's Party (2004–2011)
- Colours: Blue and white

Website
- jaunaislaiks.lv

The New Era Party (Latvian: Jaunais laiks, JL) was a centre-right political party in Latvia. Founded in 2002, the party merged with Civic Union and Society for Other Politics to form Unity in 2011.

New Era was a member of the European People's Party (EPP), and its MEPs sat in the European People's Party group (previously EPP-ED).

== History ==
New Era was founded on 2 February 2002 by Einars Repše, a politician and central banker who was very popular at that time. Originally, most of the party candidates were political unknowns led by Repše.

In its first election campaign, New Era promised to combat corruption and tax evasion. According to New Era promises, eliminating tax evasion would increase Latvia's state budget by 400 million Latvian lats (about 750 million United States dollars), allowing for increased funding for a variety of programs and also for tax cuts. Running on this platform, the party won 23.9% of the popular vote and 26 out of 100 seats in the 2002 legislative election and became the largest party in the Saeima, the parliament of Latvia. It formed a coalition government with 3 other parties, with the New Era leader Einars Repše as the prime minister. In January 2004, the coalition fell apart and Repše resigned.

New Era was in the opposition until October 2004, when it joined a coalition government led by Aigars Kalvītis of the People's Party. It left the coalition after a vote-buying scandal in the Jūrmala municipal elections which involved one of its coalition partners, the Latvia's First Party. The New Era Party first requested Latvia's First Party to leave the coalition. After Latvia's First Party and prime minister Kalvītis refused this demand, all New Era ministers resigned on 7 April 2006. In the October 2006 parliamentary elections, the New Era party won 18 seats. After the elections it did not rejoin the coalition government. Despite its significant losses, it became the largest opposition party.

Repše has lost most of his popularity, due to a sequence of scandals, but remains one of the party leaders. In March 2007, the party established a new structure, in which it had two leaders: Einars Repše and Arturs Krisjanis Karins. Arturs Krisjanis Karins is a United States citizen, born in the United States to a Latvian family.

In 2008, prominent MPs and members of the board—Ina Druviete, Karlis Sadurskis, Ilma Cepane and Sandra Kalniete—left the New Era to create Civic Union. Its leadership resigned, and Solvita Aboltina and Artis Kampars became new leaders. The chairman of the New Era parliamentary faction is Dzintars Zakis.

In March 2009, New Era Party member Valdis Dombrovskis, who served as finance minister from 2002 to 2004, became Prime Minister, bringing the New Era Party to the leadership of a 4-party, center-right coalition government.

On 6 August 2011, it merged with two other parties to form the new political party Unity.

== Ideology ==
The New Era Party had strong populist leanings and derived most of its appeal from positioning itself as the main anti-corruption force in Latvian politics. New Era supporters characterized most of the other political parties as corrupt and controlled by oligarchs. As a result, New Era had very strained relations with most of the other political parties, which made a considerable effort to leave New Era in opposition whenever possible.

On ethnic issues, New Era tended to be somewhat nationalist. Its economic positions were uncertain and have changed over time. Its original platform in 2002 included radical free-market reforms in health care and education, such as replacing government-funded higher education by student loans.

Because of its primary focus being on non-ideological matters, New Era has been classified as a 'valence populist' party.
