= Civic Union (Latvia) =

Latvian political party

Civic Union Pilsoniskā savienība
- Leader: Girts Valdis Kristovskis
- Founded: 26 April 2008
- Dissolved: 6 August 2011
- Merged into: Unity
- Headquarters: Arsenāla iela 3-2, Riga
- Ideology: Conservatism; Liberal conservatism
- Political position: Centre-right to right-wing
- European affiliation: European People's Party
- European Parliament group: European People's Party (2008-2011)
- Colours: Maroon, white, gold

Website
- http://pilsoniska-savieniba.lv/

The Civic Union (Latvian: Pilsoniskā savienība, PS) was a political party in Latvia. It was founded in 2008, and most of its members came from the For Fatherland and Freedom/LNNK and New Era Party. A liberal-conservative party, it was part of the European People's Party at the European level. It has also been described as centre-right or right-wing.

The party was part of the coalition government led by Prime Minister of Latvia Valdis Dombrovskis. The Civic Union controlled the Latvia Ministry of Defence under the then-Minister Imants Viesturs Lieģis. A party leader was Sandra Kalniete, a former European Commissioner.

In the 2009 European Parliament election the Civic Union won over 24% of the vote in Latvia and gained two Members of the European Parliament.

On 6 August 2011, it merged with two other parties to form the new political party Unity.
