= Valdis Dombrovskis =

Latvian politician (born 1971)

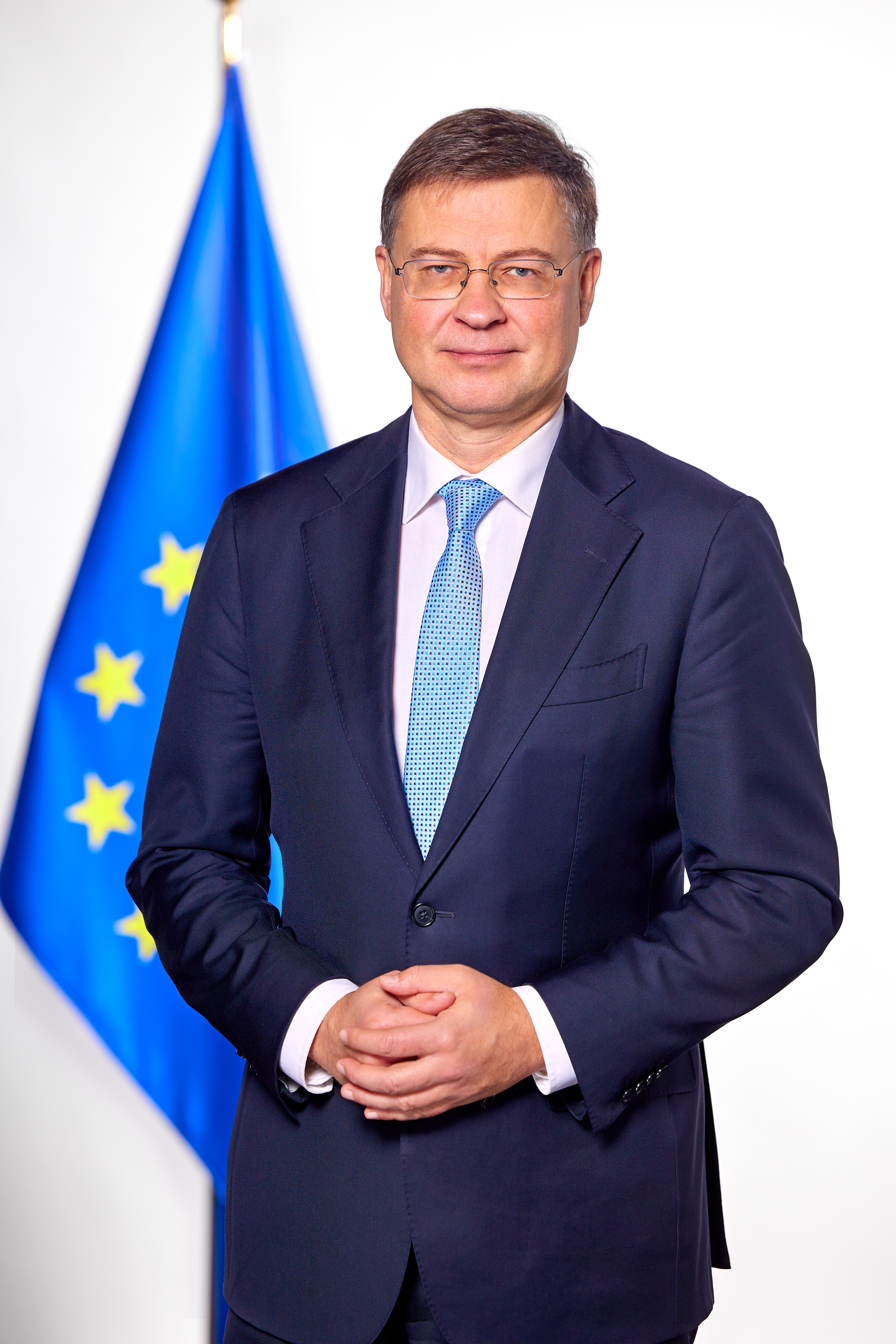
- Official portrait, 2024

European Commissioner for Economy and Productivity
- Incumbent
- Assumed office 1 December 2015
- Commission: Von der Leyen II
- Preceded by: Paolo Gentiloni

Executive Vice President of the European Commission for An Economy that Works for People
- In office 1 December 2019 – 30 November 2024 Serving with Frans Timmermans & Margrethe Vestager
- Commission: Von der Leyen I
- Preceded by: Office established
- Succeeded by: Office absolished

European Commissioner for Trade
- In office 12 October 2020 – 30 November 2024; Acting: 26 August 2020 – 12 October 2020
- Commission: Von der Leyen I
- Preceded by: Phil Hogan
- Succeeded by: Maroš Šefčovič

European Commissioner for Financial Stability, Financial Services and the Capital Markets Union
- In office 16 July 2016 – 12 October 2020
- Commission: Juncker; Von der Leyen I
- Preceded by: Jonathan Hill
- Succeeded by: Mairead McGuinness

20th Prime Minister of Latvia
- In office 12 March 2009 – 22 January 2014
- President: Valdis Zatlers; Andris Bērziņš
- Preceded by: Ivars Godmanis
- Succeeded by: Laimdota Straujuma

Minister of Finance
- In office 7 November 2002 – 9 March 2004
- Prime Minister: Einars Repše
- Preceded by: Gundars Bērziņš
- Succeeded by: Oskars Spurdziņš

Personal details
- Born: 5 August 1971 (age 55) Riga, then part of Latvian SSR, Soviet Union
- Party: New Era Party (2002–2011); Unity (2011–present)
- Other political affiliations: European People's Party
- Spouse: Ārija Dombrovska
- Education: University of Latvia; Riga Technical University; University of Maryland, College Park
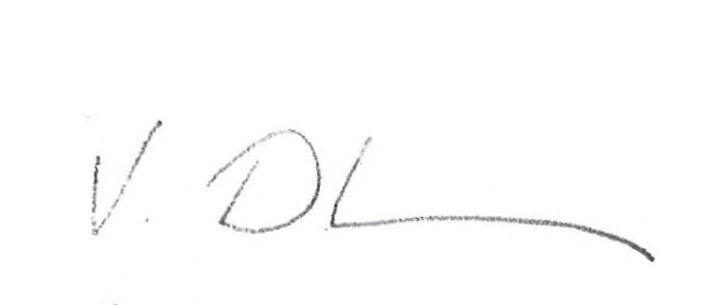
- Signature

Valdis Dombrovskis (Note: Latvian pronunciation: [ˈvaldis dɔmˈbrɔvskis]) (born 5 August 1971) is a Latvian politician serving as European Commissioner for Economy and Productivity, and Commissioner for Implementation and Simplification. He previously served as Executive Vice President of the European Commission for An Economy that Works for People (2019-2024), European Commissioner for Trade (2020-2024). European Commissioner for Financial Stability, Financial Services and Capital Markets Union (2016-2020) and Prime Minister of Latvia from 2009 to 2014.

Dombrovskis served as Minister for Finance of Latvia from 2002 to 2004. He then served as a Member of the European Parliament (MEP) for the New Era Party from 2004 to 2009. He became the Prime Minister of Latvia in 2009, serving until his resignation in 2014. He was Vice-President of the European Commission for the Euro and Social Dialogue from 2014 to 2019. Following the resignation of Lord Jonathan Hill, Dombrovskis served as European Commissioner for Financial Stability, Financial Services and the Capital Markets Union from 2016 to 2020. Following the resignation of Phil Hogan, it was announced that he would take over the portfolio for Trade.

== Education and science career ==
Born in Riga to a family with Polish roots (the original Polish surname is Dąbrowski), Dombrovskis earned a bachelor's degree in economics for engineers from Riga Technical University in 1995 and a master's degree in physics from the University of Latvia in 1996. He worked as a laboratory assistant at the Institute of Physics of the University of Mainz in Mainz, Germany, from 1995 to 1996, as an assistant at the University of Latvia's Institute of Solid-State Physics in 1997, and as a PhD student at the A. James Clark School of Engineering at the University of Maryland, College Park for electrical engineering in 1998.

== Political career ==
=== Career in national politics ===
In 2002, Dombrovskis became a board member of the New Era Party. He was Minister of Finance from 2002 to 2004 and a Member of the Latvian Parliament during its 8th parliamentary term (2002–2004). Then he was Observer at the Council of the European Union (2003–2004).

=== Member of the European Parliament, 2004–2009 ===
As Member of the European Parliament, Dombrovskis was a member of three European Parliament Committees: Committee on Budgets, Delegation to the ACP-EU Joint Parliamentary Assembly, Delegation to the Euro-Latin American Parliamentary Assembly. He is also a Substitute at Committee on Economic and Monetary Affairs, Committee on Budgetary Control and delegation to the EU-Kazakhstan, EU-Kyrgyzstan, and EU-Uzbekistan Parliamentary Cooperation Committees, and for relations with Tajikistan, Turkmenistan and Mongolia.

Dombrovskis was also one of six Members of the European Parliament participating in the European Union's observer mission in Togo for the October 2007 Togolese parliamentary election.

=== Prime Minister of Latvia, 2009–2014 ===
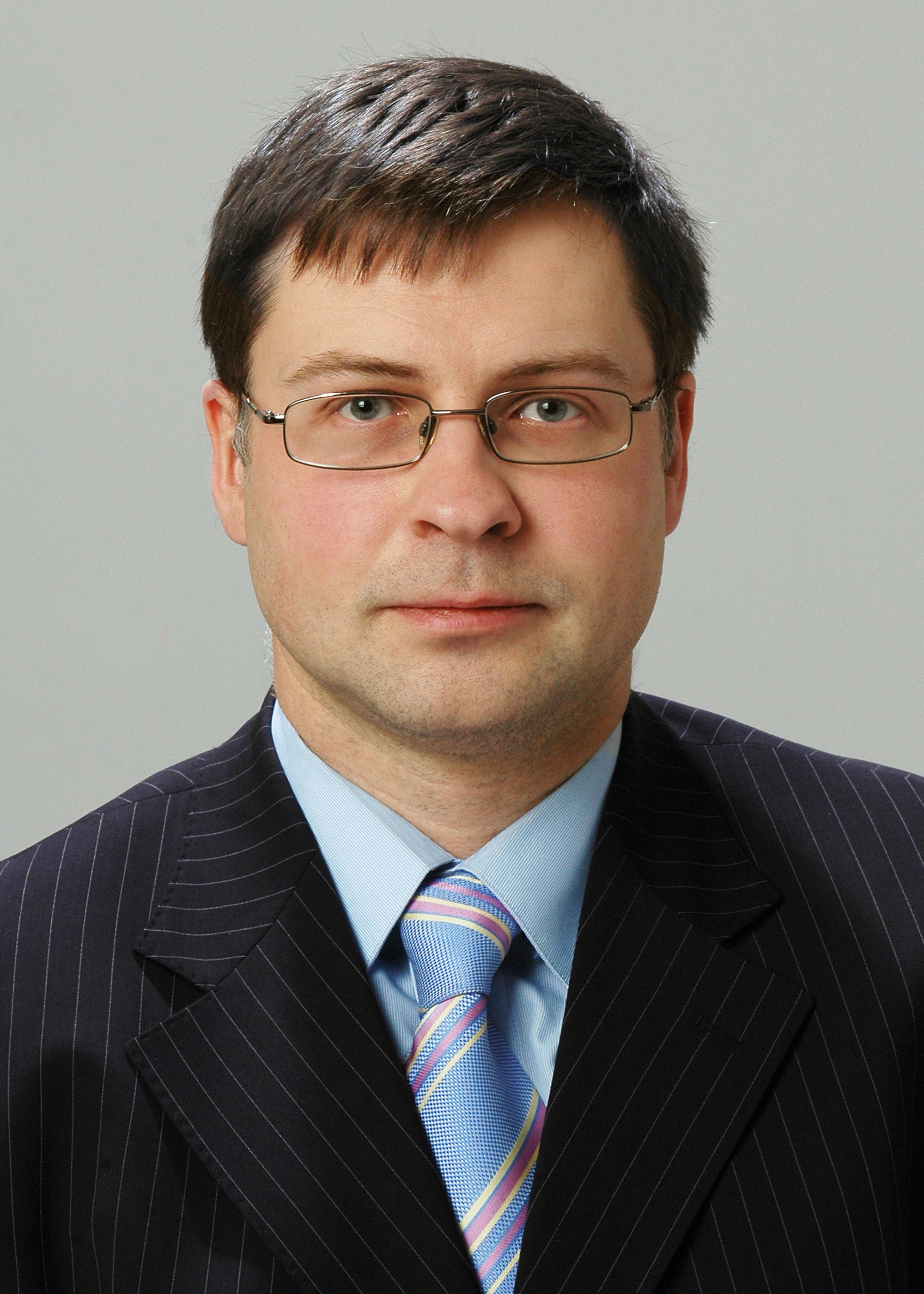
Official portrait, 2009

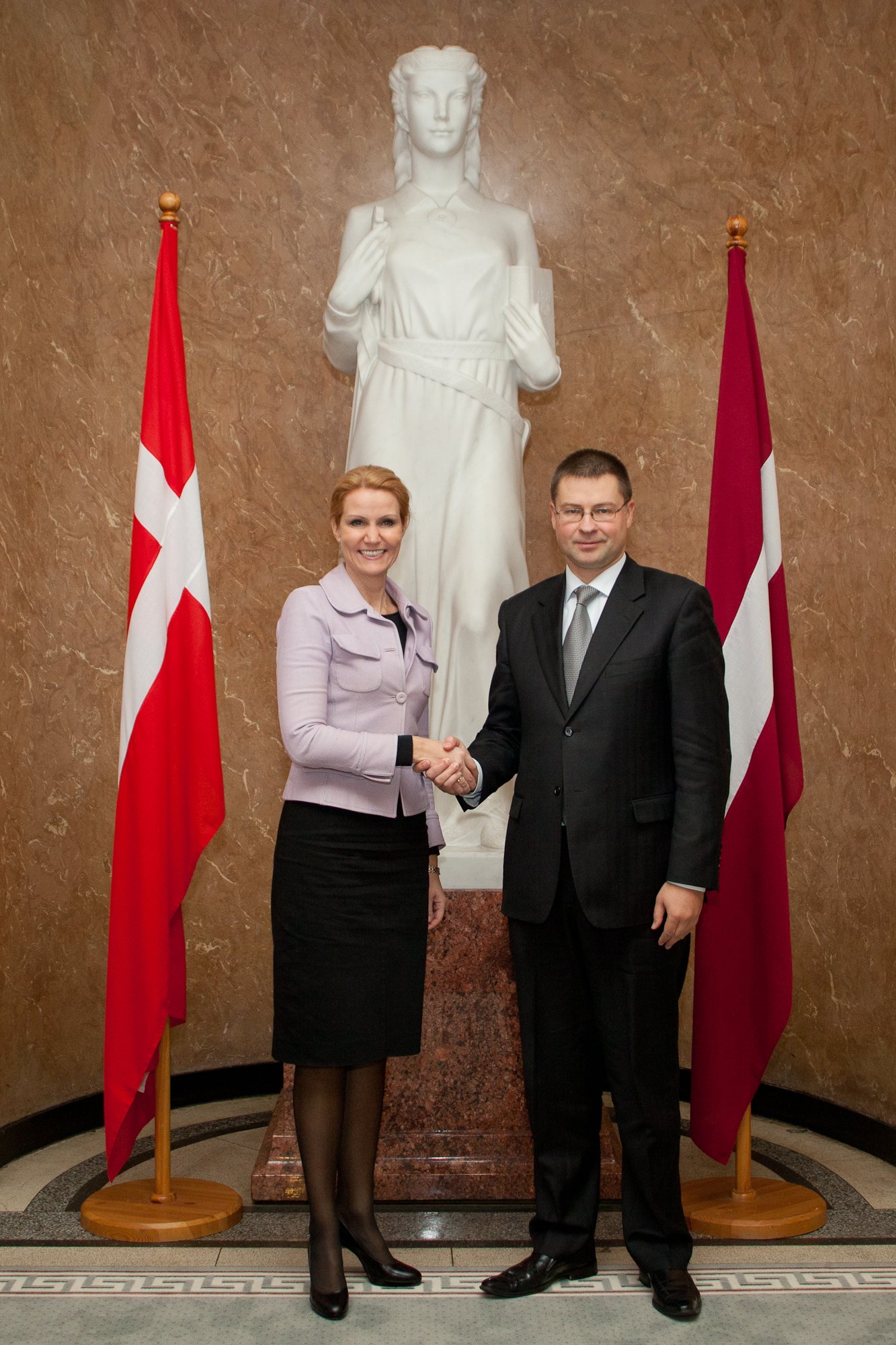
Dombrovskis meets with Danish Prime Minister Helle Thorning-Schmidt in Riga, 28 October 2011

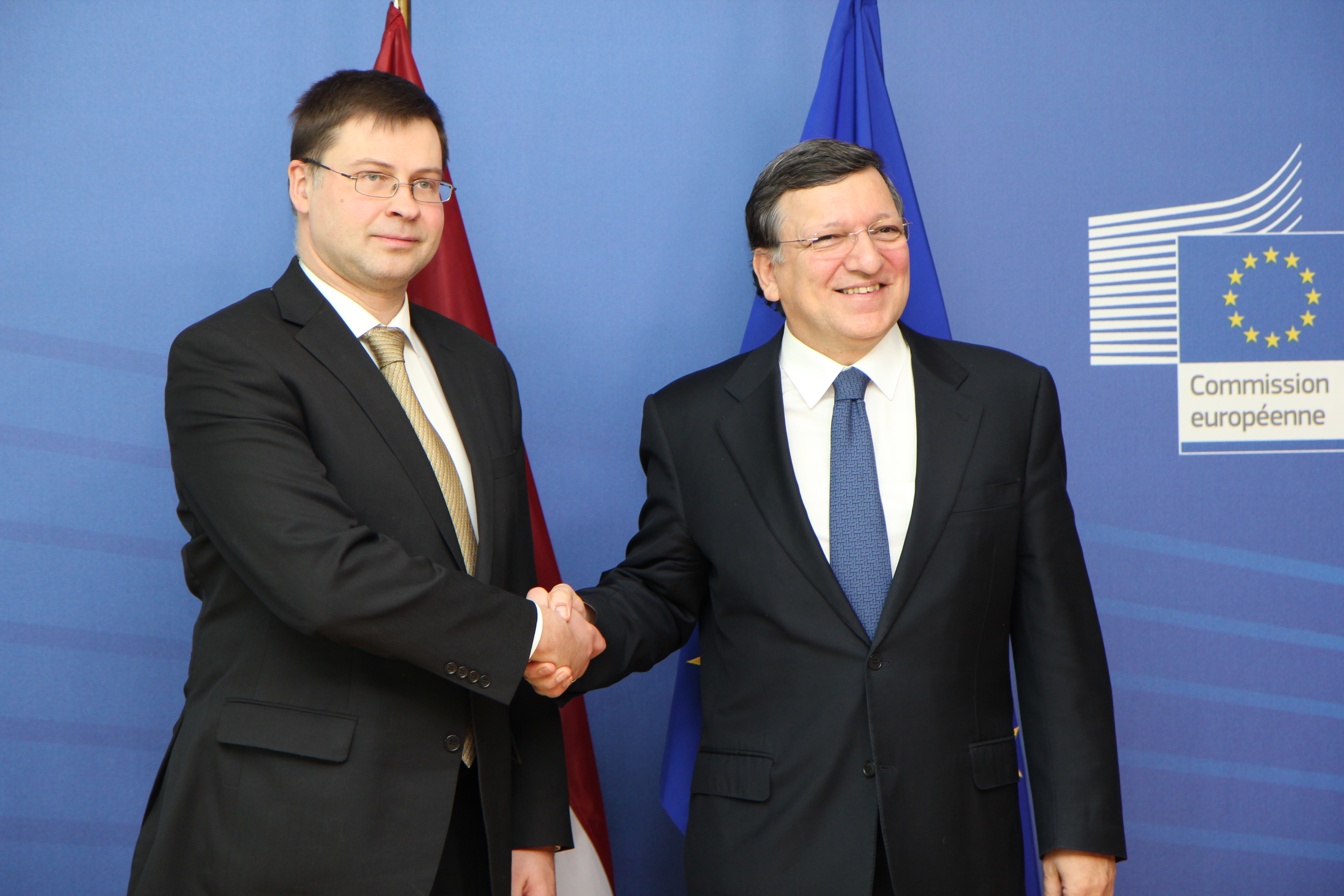
Dombrovskis meets with President of the European Commission José Manuel Barroso in Brussels, 13 March 2013

On 26 February 2009, following the resignation of Ivars Godmanis, President Valdis Zatlers nominated Dombrovskis to succeed Godmanis as prime minister. It was believed that his government would consist of three of the four previously governing parties (all but Godmanis' LPP/LC), his own New Era Party, and a smaller right-wing party (the Civic Union); the government was approved on 12 March 2009.

Dombrovskis resigned as prime minister on 27 November 2013 following the Zolitūde shopping centre roof collapse in which 54 people were killed. He announced that a new government is needed with strong support in the parliament after the tragedy, considering all related circumstances. His spokesman said that "the government takes political responsibility for the tragedy". He denied the president had urged him to step down, stating that he had considered the decision for days and that the country needs government with strong support in parliament in the moment of crisis.

=== Member of the European Commission, 2014–present ===
In February 2014, Dombrovskis officially lodged his application to be the candidate of the centre-right European People's Party (EPP) for the presidency of the European Commission; shortly after he withdrew his candidacy to endorse Jean-Claude Juncker instead. The Latvian government later nominated Dombrovskis to be the country's European Commissioner.

Dombrovskis served as European Commission Vice-President for the Euro and Social Dialogue from 2014 to 2019. From July 2016, he was also in charge of the financial services portfolio formerly overseen by British Commissioner Jonathan Hill, who resigned after the Brexit vote. In addition, he has been serving as co-chair of the EPP Economic and Financial Affairs Ministers Meeting – alongside Petteri Orpo (2016-2019) and Paschal Donohoe (since 2019) – which gathers the center-right EPP ministers ahead of meetings of the Economic and Financial Affairs Council (ECOFIN).

Following the 2019 European election, Dombrovskis was nominated by the coalition government of Prime Minister Arturs Krišjānis Kariņš for a second term as Latvia's European Commissioner. He subsequently decided to relinquish the seat he won in the election; he was succeeded by Inese Vaidere, also once again in 2024. Ursula von der Leyen has since proposed that Frans Timmermans, Margrethe Vestager and Dombrovskis all serve as Executive Vice-Presidents of the commission with Dombrovskis having responsibility for an "Economy that Works for People". As Vice-Presidents of the commission, Dombrovskis has been a co-chair of the Trade and Technology Council since its creation in 2021.

==== Supporter of the University of Latvia Foundation ====
Dombrovskis is a supporter of the University of Latvia Foundation. In 2018, he donated 1,500 euros, awarding 3 one-time Valdis Dombrovskis Excellence Scholarships to Bachelor of Science students of the University of Latvia.

== Other activities ==
- European Bank for Reconstruction and Development (EBRD), Ex-Officio Member of the Board of Governors (since 2019)

== Personal life ==
He is married to Ārija Dombrovska. The two have no children. Dombrovskis plays basketball and goes skiing in his freetime.

== See also ==
- First Dombrovskis cabinet
- Second Dombrovskis cabinet
- Third Dombrovskis cabinet
- Capital Markets Union

Political offices
Preceded by Gundars Bērziņš	Minister of Finance; 2002–2004	Succeeded by Oskars Spurdziņš
Preceded by Ivars Godmanis	Prime Minister of Latvia; 2009–2014	Succeeded by Laimdota Straujuma
Preceded by Jonathan Hill	European Commissioner for Financial Stability, Financial Services and Capital Markets Union; 2016–2020	Succeeded by Mairead McGuinness
Preceded by Andris Piebalgs	Latvian European Commissioner; 2014–present	Incumbent
Preceded by Jyrki Katainen as European Commissioner for Economic and Monetary Affairs and the Euro	European Vice President for the Euro and Social Dialogue; 2014–2019	Incumbent
Preceded by Phil Hogan	European Commissioner for Trade; Acting; 2020–present	Incumbent
