= List of members of the European Parliament for Latvia, 2004–2009 =

Members of the European Parliament for Latvia
Observers	(2003)
Delegation	(2004)
6th term	(2004)
7th term	(2009)
8th term	(2014)
9th term	(2019)
10th term	(2024)

This is the list of the 9 members of the European Parliament for Latvia in the 2004 to 2009 session.

== List ==
Name	National party	EP Group
Georgs Andrejevs	Latvian Way	ALDE
Valdis Dombrovskis	New Era Party	EPP–ED
Guntars Krasts	For Fatherland and Freedom/LNNK	UEN
Ģirts Kristovskis	For Fatherland and Freedom/LNNK	UEN
Aldis Kušķis	New Era Party	EPP–ED
Rihards Pīks	People's Party	EPP–ED
Inese Vaidere	For Fatherland and Freedom/LNNK	UEN
Tatjana Ždanoka	For Human Rights in United Latvia	G–EFA
Roberts Zīle	For Fatherland and Freedom/LNNK	UEN

=== Party representation ===
National party	EP Group	Seats	±
For Fatherland and Freedom/LNNK	UEN	4 / 9	
New Era Party	EPP–ED	2 / 9	
For Human Rights in United Latvia	G–EFA	1 / 9	
People's Party	EPP–ED	1 / 9	
Latvian Way	ALDE	1 / 9	
