= List of observers to the European Parliament for Latvia, 2003–2004 =

Members of the European Parliament for Latvia
Observers	(2003)
Delegation	(2004)
6th term	(2004)
7th term	(2009)
8th term	(2014)
9th term	(2019)
10th term	(2024)

This is a list of the 9 observers to the European Parliament for Latvia in the 1999 to 2004 session. They were appointed by the Latvian Parliament as observers from 1 May 2003 until the accession of Latvia to the EU on 1 May 2004.

== List ==
Name	National party	EP Group
Martijans Bekasovs	Socialist Party	EUL–NGL
Boris Tsilevitch	People's Harmony Party	PES
Juris Dobelis	For Fatherland and Freedom/LNNK	UEN
Andis Kāposts	Union of Greens and Farmers	G–EFA
Aleksandrs Kiršteins	People's Party	EPP–ED
Paulis Kļaviņš	First Party	EPP–ED
Aldis Kušķis	New Era Party	EPP–ED
Liene Liepiņa	New Era Party	EPP–ED
Rihards Pīks	People's Party	EPP–ED

== Sources ==
- Ministry of Foreign Affairs (in Latvian)
