= List of members of the European Parliament for Latvia, 2019–2024 =

This is a list of members of the European Parliament for Latvia for the 2019–2024 Parliament.

See 2019 European Parliament election in Latvia for further information on these elections in Latvia.

Members of the European Parliament for Latvia
Observers	(2003)
Delegation	(2004)
6th term	(2004)
7th term	(2009)
8th term	(2014)
9th term	(2019)
10th term	(2024)

== List ==
On the Unity list: (EPP Group): 1. Sandra Kalniete; 2. Inese Vaidere; 3. Dace Melbārde (Initially elected from National Alliance); On the Harmony list: (S&D): 1. Nils Ušakovs; 2. Andris Ameriks; On the National Alliance list: (ECR): 1. Roberts Zīle; 2. Ansis Pūpols	On the Movement For! list: (Renew): 1. Ivars Ijabs; On the Latvian Russian Union list: (Greens-EFA): 1. Tatjana Ždanoka
