= List of members of the European Parliament for Latvia, 2024–2029 =

Members of the European Parliament for Latvia
Observers	(2003)
Delegation	(2004)
6th term	(2004)
7th term	(2009)
8th term	(2014)
9th term	(2019)
10th term	(2024)

This is a list of the 9 members of the European Parliament for Latvia in the 2024 to 2029 session. The members were elected in the 2024 European Parliament election in Latvia.

== List ==
Name	National party	EP Group	Preference votes
Sandra Kalniete	New Unity (JV)	EPP	177,696
Inese Vaidere (Note: Valdis Dombrovskis was elected but he did not take over his seat in order to become a European commissioner.)	New Unity (JV)	EPP	147,075
Roberts Zīle	National Alliance (NA)	ECR	179,216
Rihards Kols	National Alliance (NA)	ECR	148,291
Ivars Ijabs	For Latvia's Development (LA)	RE	74,235
Reinis Pozņaks	United List (AS)	ECR	61,012
Mārtiņš Staķis	The Progressives (PRO)	Greens/EFA	58,488
Nils Ušakovs	Social Democratic Party "Harmony" (S)	S&D	60,281
Vilis Krištopans	Latvia First (LPV)	PfE	46,658

Source: "EIROPAS PARLAMENTA VĒLĒŠANAS 2024". epv2024.cvk.lv.
