= List of members of the European Parliament for Latvia, 2014–2019 =

This is a list of members of the European Parliament for Latvia for the 2014-2019 Parliament.

See 2014 European Parliament election in Latvia for further information on these elections in Latvia.

Members of the European Parliament for Latvia
Observers	(2003)
Delegation	(2004)
6th term	(2004)
7th term	(2009)
8th term	(2014)
9th term	(2019)
10th term	(2024)

== List ==
Name	National party	EP Group	'Points'
Sandra Kalniete	Unity	EPP	277 124
Artis Pabriks (Resigns on 27 November 2018); Kārlis Šadurskis (from 28 November 2018)	Unity	EPP	261 163
Krišjānis Kariņš (Resigns on 23 January 2019); Aleksejs Loskutovs (from 24 January 2019)	Unity	EPP	228 998
Valdis Dombrovskis (Resigns on 31 October 2014); Inese Vaidere (from 1 November 2014)	Unity	EPP	223 477
Roberts Zīle	National Alliance (NA)	ERC	99 937
Andrejs Mamikins	Harmony (SDPS)	S&D	84 953
Iveta Grigule	Greens & Farmers (ZZS)	EFDD(until 15 October 2014); NI (from 16 October 2014 to 26 April 2015); ALDE (from 27 April 2015)	46 939
Tatjana Ždanoka (Resigns on 4 March 2018); Miroslavs Mitrofanovs (from 5 March 2018)	Russian Union (LKS)	G-EFA	51 742

'Points' are calculated from votes cast for a candidate's lists minus 'crossings-out' and adding 'pluses'

Source: "European Elections 2014". Central Election Commission.
