= List of members of the European Parliament for Latvia, 2009–2014 =

Members of the European Parliament for Latvia
Observers	(2003)
Delegation	(2004)
6th term	(2004)
7th term	(2009)
8th term	(2014)
9th term	(2019)
10th term	(2024)

This is the list of the members of the European Parliament for Latvia in the 2009 to 2014 session. One person from Civic Union entered the Parliament in December 2011, bringing the number of MEPs back to 9.

== List ==
Name	National party	EP Group	Votes
Ivars Godmanis	Latvia's First Party/Latvian Way	ALDE	
Sandra Kalniete	Civic Union	EPP	
Artūrs Kariņš	New Era Party	EPP	
Alexander Mirsky	Harmony Centre	S&D	
Alfreds Rubiks	Harmony Centre	EUL–NGL	
Kārlis Šadurskis	Civic Union	EPP	
Inese Vaidere	Civic Union	EPP	
Tatjana Ždanoka	For Human Rights in United Latvia	G–EFA	
Roberts Zīle	For Fatherland and Freedom/LNNK	ECR	

=== Party representation ===
National party	EP Group	Seats	±
Civic Union	EPP	2 / 8	▲2
Harmony Centre	Various	2 / 8	▲2
For Human Rights in United Latvia	G–EFA	1 / 8	Steady
Latvia's First Party/Latvian Way	ALDE	1 / 8	Steady
For Fatherland and Freedom/LNNK	ECR	1 / 8	▼3
New Era Party	EPP	1 / 8	▼1
