= Latvia (European Parliament constituency) =

Constituency of the European Parliament

- European Parliament constituency
- Location among the current constituencies
- Member state: Latvia
- Created: 2004
- MEPs: 9 (2004–2009); 8 (2009–present)

Latvia is a European Parliament constituency for elections in the European Union covering the member state of Latvia. It is currently represented by eight Members of the European Parliament.

== Members of the European Parliament ==
Election	MEP (party)	MEP (party)	MEP (party)	MEP (party)	MEP (party)	MEP (party)	MEP (party)	MEP (party)	MEP (party)
2004	Roberts Zīle (LNNK/ NA)	Guntars Krasts (LNNK)	Ģirts Valdis Kristovskis (LNNK)	Inese Vaidere (LNNK)	Tatjana Ždanoka (ForHURL /LKS)	Georgs Andrejevs (Latvian Way)	Valdis Dombrovskis (JL)	Aldis Kušķis (JL)	Rihards Pīks (TP)
2009	Roberts Zīle (LNNK/ NA)	Guntars Krasts (LNNK)	Ģirts Valdis Kristovskis (LNNK)	Inese Vaidere (LNNK)	Tatjana Ždanoka (ForHURL /LKS)	Georgs Andrejevs (Latvian Way)	Liene Liepiņa (JL)	Aldis Kušķis (JL)	Rihards Pīks (TP)
2009	Roberts Zīle (LNNK/ NA)	Sandra Kalniete (PS/ Unity)	Kārlis Šadurskis (PS)	Inese Vaidere (PS)	Tatjana Ždanoka (ForHURL /LKS)	Alfreds Rubiks (LC)	Alexander Mirsky (LC)	Krišjānis Kariņš (JL)	Ivars Godmanis (LPP/LC)
2014	Roberts Zīle (LNNK/ NA)	Sandra Kalniete (PS/ Unity)	Artis Pabriks (Unity)	Krišjānis Kariņš (Unity)	Tatjana Ždanoka (ForHURL /LKS)	Valdis Dombrovskis (Unity)	Andrejs Mamikins (Harmony)	Iveta Grigule (ZZS)	8 seats
2014	Roberts Zīle (LNNK/ NA)	Sandra Kalniete (PS/ Unity)	Artis Pabriks (Unity)	Krišjānis Kariņš (Unity)	Tatjana Ždanoka (ForHURL /LKS)	Inese Vaidere (Unity)	Andrejs Mamikins (Harmony)	Iveta Grigule (ZZS)	8 seats
2018	Roberts Zīle (LNNK/ NA)	Sandra Kalniete (PS/ Unity)	Kārlis Šadurskis (Unity)	Krišjānis Kariņš (Unity)	Miroslavs Mitrofanovs (LKS)	Inese Vaidere (Unity)	Andrejs Mamikins (Harmony)	Iveta Grigule (ZZS)	8 seats
2019	Roberts Zīle (LNNK/ NA)	Sandra Kalniete (PS/ Unity)	Kārlis Šadurskis (Unity)	Aleksejs Loskutovs (Unity)	Miroslavs Mitrofanovs (LKS)	Inese Vaidere (Unity)	Andrejs Mamikins (Harmony)	Iveta Grigule (ZZS)	8 seats
2019	Roberts Zīle (LNNK/ NA)	Sandra Kalniete (PS/ Unity)	Dace Melbārde (Unity)	Andris Ameriks (Harmony)	Ivars Ijabs (Movement For! /LA)	Inese Vaidere (Unity)	Nils Ušakovs (Harmony)	Ansis Pūpols (NA)	Tatjana Ždanoka (LKS)
2024	Roberts Zīle (LNNK/ NA)	Sandra Kalniete (PS/ Unity)	Vilis Krištopans (LPV)	Mārtiņš Staķis (PRO)	Ivars Ijabs (Movement For! /LA)	Inese Vaidere (Unity)	Nils Ušakovs (Harmony)	Rihards Kols (NA)	Reinis Pozņaks (AS)

== Elections ==
=== 2004 ===
The 2004 European election was the sixth election to the European Parliament and the first for Latvia.

=== 2009 ===
The 2009 European election was the seventh election to the European Parliament and the second for Latvia.

=== 2014 ===
The 2014 European election was the eighth election to the European Parliament and the third for Latvia.

=== 2019 ===
The 2019 European election was the ninth election to the European Parliament and the fourth for Latvia.

=== 2024 ===
The 2024 European election was the tenth election to the European Parliament and the fifth for Latvia.
