= European Conservatives and Reformists Group Executive =

The European Conservatives and Reformists Group Executive comprises the governing council of the European Conservatives and Reformists group in the European Parliament. They are responsible for policy and internal governance decision-making.

== Membership ==
As of 12 July 2024, the Executive of the ECR Group had the following members:

Position	Name	Party
Co-President	Joachim Brudzinski	(Poland) Law and Justice
Co-President	Nicola Procaccini	Brothers of Italy
Vice-President	Assita Kanko	(Belgium) New Flemish Alliance
Vice-President	Charlie Weimers	(Sweden) Swedish Democrats
Vice-Chairman	Alexandr Vondra	(Czech Republic) Civic Democratic Party
Co-Treasurer	Kosma Złotowski	(Poland) Law and Justice
Co-Treasurer	Denis Nesci	Brothers of Italy

== Past leadership ==
=== Chairman ===
- Michal Kaminski (14 July 2009 – 8 March 2011)
- Jan Zahradil (8 March 2011 – 11 December 2011)
- Martin Callanan (11 December 2011 – 12 June 2014)
- Syed Kamall (12 June 2014 - 2019)
- Ryszard Legutko (co-chairman, 2019-2024)
- Raffaele Fitto (co-chairman, 2019-2024)

== Election ==
Members of the Executive are elected on a nomination and seconding basis by free election of all member MEPs.
