= Liene Liepiņa =

Latvian politician

Liene Liepiņa (born 26 July 1957) is a Latvian politician who served as a Member of the European Parliament for the New Era Party from 2003 to 2004.

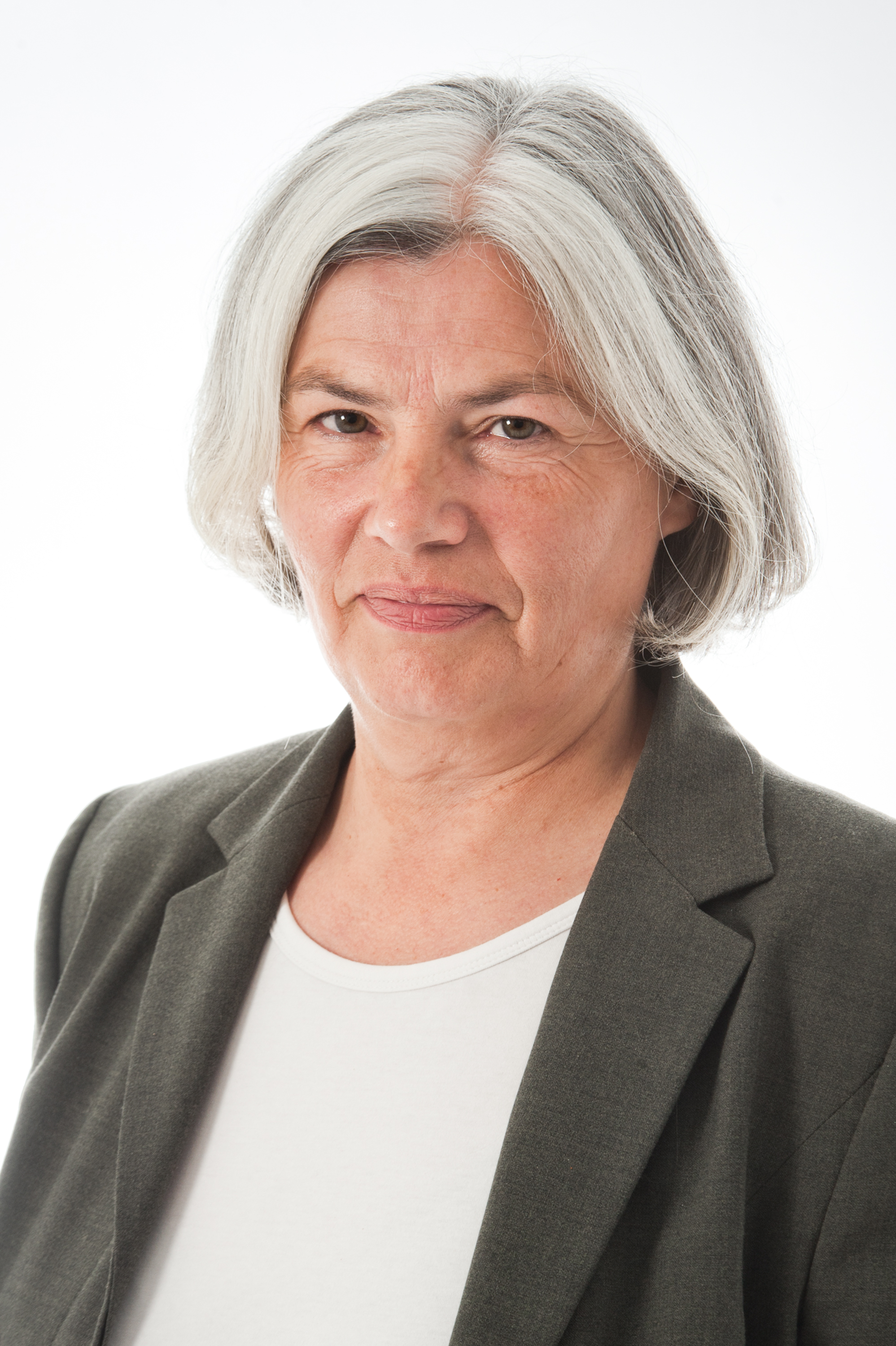
