= Aldis Kušķis =

Latvian politician (born 1965)

Aldis Kušķis (born 6 October 1965, in Riga) is a Latvian politician. From 2004 till 2009 he was Member of the European Parliament for the New Era Party; part of the European People's Party.
