= Roberts Zīle =

Latvian economist and politician

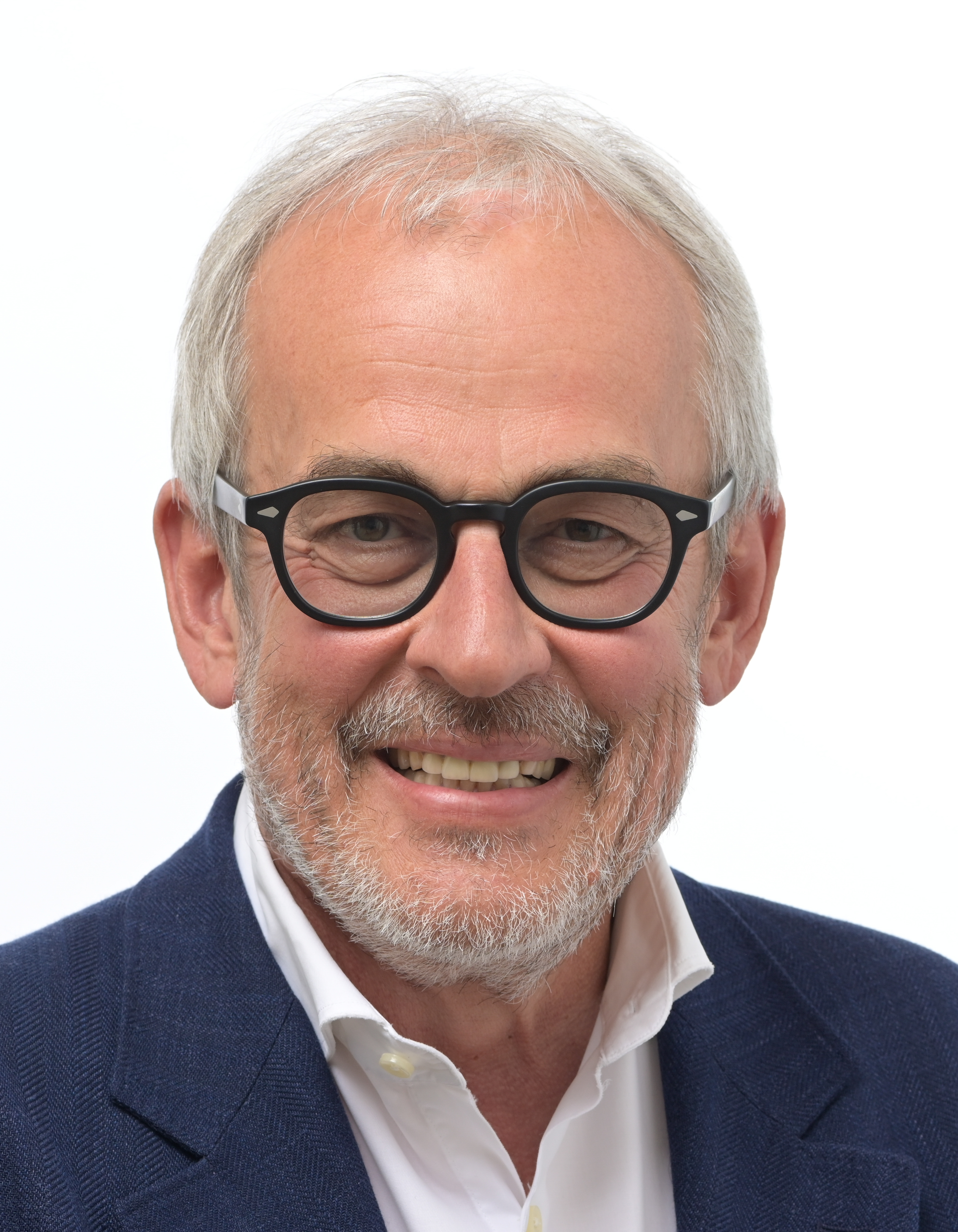
- Zīle in 2024

Vice-President of the European Parliament
- Incumbent
- Assumed office 18 January 2022 Serving with See List
- President: Roberta Metsola

Member of the European Parliament for Latvia
- Incumbent
- Assumed office 20 July 2004

Personal details
- Born: 20 June 1958 (age 68) Riga, Soviet Union
- Party: For Fatherland and Freedom/LNNK (1993–2011); National Alliance (since 2011)
- Education: University of Latvia; Latvia University of Agriculture
- Occupation: Economist
- Website: robertszile.lv

Roberts Zīle (born 20 June 1958) is a Latvian economist and politician and Vice President of the European Parliament for the National Alliance, a free market national conservative right-wing populist political party in Latvia. In the seventh term of the European Parliament, he works in the European Conservatives and Reformists group; he is a member of European Conservatives and Reformists Group Executive and a member of the group Bureau. He was formerly vice-president of the now defunct Union for a Europe of Nations group.

== Background ==
Zīle was born in Riga on 20 June 1958 and gained his first education in the Riga 25th high school. After graduating in 1976, Zīle continued his education at the University of Latvia, Faculty of Economics, culminating in a baccalaureate degree in economics in 1981. In 1983, Zīle began part-time studies at the Latvian Institute of Agriculture and Agricultural Economics. During the period between 1992 and 1994, Zīle interned at the Iowa State University in the US, at the Brandon University in Canada, and at the La Trobe University in Australia. Finally, in 1997 Zīle gained a doctorate degree of economics from the Latvian University of Agriculture.

== Early career ==
Zīle began his career in 1980 as editor of the publishing house "Avots". From 1982 until 1986 Zīle was a research fellow, later appointed to head of unit, at the Latvian State Institute of Agrarian Economics. From 1989 to 1993, Zīle was editor of the economics section of the Citizens' Congress of the Republic of Latvia newspaper "Citizen" ("Pilsonis") and the LNNK newspaper "National Independence" ("Nacionālā Neatkarība").

== Political career in Latvia ==
Zīle began his political career in 1990, when he became member of the executive institution of the Latvian Citizens' Congress, the Committee of Latvia.

In 1994, Zīle ran in the Riga City Council elections from the "For Fatherland and Freedom" party's list. After being a deputy in the Riga City Council, he became an assistant to Ilmārs Dāliņš, a member of the 5th Saeima (Parliament of Latvia). In 1995, Zīle was himself elected in the 6th Saeima from the "For Fatherland and Freedom" list. He worked there as a member of the European Affairs committee and the Budget and Finance committee. Later, Zīle became chairman of the Budget and Finance committee.

In February 1997, Zīle became Minister of Finance of Latvia under Prime Minister Andris Šķēle. The position was extended from July 1997 to November 1998 in the government of Guntars Krasts. In October 1998, Zīle was elected to the 7th Saeima from the recently founded political Union's "For Fatherland and Freedom"/LNNK (TB/LNNK) list. In the 7th Saeima, Zīle continued his work in the European Affairs committee and the Budget and Finance committee. Zīle also served as the Minister of Special Affairs for cooperation with international financial institutions in the government of Vilis Krištopans from November 1998 to July 1999, in the government of Andris Šķēle from July 1999 to May 2000, and in the government of Andris Bērziņš from May 2000 to July 2002. In January 2000, Zīle resigned his seat in the Saeima due to a new legislation which banned simultaneous holding of positions of a Minister and a Member of Saeima.

In 2002, Zīle was elected to the 8th Saeima from the TB/LNNK list. In November 2002, Zīle resigned from the Parliament, because he was confirmed as a Minister of Transport in the government of Einars Repše. Zīle held this position until March 2004.

In July 2006, TB/LNNK nominated Zīle as a candidate for the position of Prime Minister. In December 2006, he was elected chairman of TB/LNNK. In July 2011, upon the creation of the new association of political parties National Alliance "All for Latvia!" - "For Fatherland and Freedom/LNNK", Zīle became co-chairman of the association from the TB/LNNK side. In August 2011, he resigned his post as co-chairman, declaring that he wishes to focus his attention on the events in the European Parliament and believes that the leaders of the National Alliance should be based in Latvia.

== Political career in the European Parliament ==
For the sixth term of the European Parliament, Zīle ran in the 2004 European Parliament elections as representative of TB/LNNK. As a result, he was elected in June 2004 and became Member of the European Parliament (MEP). As MEP, Zīle joined the nationally conservative Union for Europe of the Nations political group, where he served as vice-president. Zīle worked in the Transport and Tourism committee, the Industry, Research and Energy committee, as well as in the Delegation for Relations with Australia.

At the 2009 European Parliament elections, Zīle was the top candidate for the For Fatherland and Freedom/LNNK ticket. He was elected and became MEP in June 2009. Due to the departure of several parties, the Union for Europe of the Nations group was terminated. Zīle thereafter joined the British Conservative party's initiated European Conservatives and Reformists group (ECR), whose largest members include the British Conservative Party, the Czech Civic Democratic Party and the Polish Law and Justice party. He is a member of the European Conservatives and Reformists Group Executive. Zīle currently has been working in the European Parliament's Transport and Tourism committee, the Delegation for Relations with the People's Republic of China, and, as a substitute, in the Economic and Monetary Affairs committee. He was also active in the temporary Special Committee on the Financial and Economic Crisis, created in 2009.

The creation of the ECR brought TB/LNNK and Zīle into the political media spotlight in Britain. Left-wing British politicians including the Secretary of State for Foreign and Commonwealth Affairs, David Miliband and Denis MacShane criticised the activities and views of Zīle and his party. Miliband wrote of TB/LNNK "its members attend commemorations for the Waffen-SS". In a response, Shadow Foreign Secretary William Hague demanded an apology to TB/LNNK and the Latvian government from Miliband, describing his remarks as recycling "false Soviet propaganda" and noting that "the majority of parties forming Latvia’s current Government including the Prime Minister’s party, have attended the commemoration of Latvians who fought in the Second World War". Zīle himself wrote a response in the left-wing Guardian newspaper: "I am proud of the new European Conservatives and Reformists group we have formed in the European parliament. Its foundations are strong, and the more bile and mud thrown by the leftwing press and domestic opponents, the more united and resolved we have become".

== Academic activities ==
During his career, Zīle has represented Latvia in a variety of international scientific projects, including programmes developed by the FAO, OECD and the European Commission ACE programme. He has published articles and research papers on property rights and agricultural policy issues in the United States of America, Australia, Norway, Finland, Hungary, Slovakia and Germany.

== Political and social activities ==
Zīle began his political activities as a member of the 18th November Association, Latvian Citizen's Congress and Union "For Fatherland and Freedom". Simultaneously, he was also active in the Popular Front of Latvia. He is one of the founders of the Economists Association 2010, which was launched in 1994. The association was created to stimulate economic growth of the national economy and to educate the public on economy issues. The association is widely known due to its connection with the Spīdola Award. At the moment, Zīle is a member of the board of the association.

Zīle has been a member of the board of the "Foundation for the Development of Public Ideas -- Think!" ("Domā!") since 2012. The objective of the foundation is to offer and introduce new ideas for the political, economic and social life in Latvia and the EU, based on nationally conservative values. Zile has managed or partly managed three of the conferences organized by the foundation - on the unemployment and quality of life of the Latvian youth in May 2012, on conservative values in the modern world in October 2012, and on drivers of energy sector in the Baltics.

Zīle has participated in numerous public guest lectures in universities in Latvia on topics related to the economy and politics of the European Union, as well as various conferences on macroeconomic and energy related issues in the European Parliament.

Prior to the 9th Saeima elections Zīle developed an extensive economic reform program (sometimes called Zīle's program), designed to prevent a looming real estate crisis and to create a socially equitable tax system in Latvia, which would be oriented towards productive investments.

In the European Parliament, Zīle's current agenda is focused on issues related to the EU transport policy, especially the "Rail Baltica" railway project; overcoming the economic crisis; the economic governance of the EU and solving banking issues; energy, especially ensuring the energy independence of the Baltic countries from Russia.

In Latvian domestic affairs, Zīle has been continuing activities focused on ensuring the long term macroeconomic stability and overhaul of the tax system. His objective is to prevent the creation of a new banking and real estate bubble based on non-resident activities, as well as to decrease the tax burden on labour, especially low income households and families with children. He also advocates tax increase on capital gains and income from speculative activities with real estate, as well as calls for a state aid for the acquisition of residence for new families.

Party political offices
Preceded by Jānis Straume	Chairman of For Fatherland and Freedom/LNNK; 2006 –	Incumbent
