= Union for Europe of the Nations =

Former national-conservative political group of the European Parliament

- European Parliament group
- Formal name: Union for Europe of the Nations Group
- Ideology: National conservatism; Conservatism; Euroscepticism
- Political position: Right-wing
- European parties: Alliance for Europe of the Nations
- From: 20 July 1999
- To: 1 July 2009
- Preceded by: Union for Europe
- Chaired by: Charles Pasqua, (99-04); Brian Crowley, (04-09); Cristiana Muscardini, (04-09)
- MEP(s): 31 (20 July 1999); 30 (22 July 1999); 23 (30 April 2004); 30 (5 May 2004); 27 (4 June 2004); 27 (20 July 2004); 44 (10 February 2008); 35 (11 June 2009)
- Website: uengroup.org

Union for Europe of the Nations (UEN) was a national-conservative, Eurosceptic political group that operated in the European Parliament between 1999 and 2009. At its height in February 2008, it had 44 MEPs. UEN was affiliated with the Alliance for Europe of the Nations political party.

UEN was formed as the successor of the Union for Europe group. Its members were parties such as the Rally for France, Italian National Alliance and Lega Nord, Irish Fianna Fáil, and Polish Law and Justice. After the 2009 European Parliament election, UEN was dissolved due to its member parties opting to switch to other groups.

== History ==
UEN was formed on 20 July 1999 for the 5th European Parliament, supplanting the earlier Union for Europe. Its member parties Fianna Fáil (FF) and the National Alliance (AN) were the driving forces behind the group, despite their being alone in the group in their support for the proposed European Constitution. Gianfranco Fini, leader of AN, was a member of the Convention which drafted the Constitution, while Bertie Ahern, leader of FF, negotiated the treaty as President of the European Council in 2004.

UEN was a heterogeneous group: broadly Eurosceptic and national-conservative, it included some parties which were either uncomfortable with this characterisation or eventually evolved into something different. More specifically, FF was a "catch all" centre-right party and later joined the Alliance of Liberals and Democrats for Europe, AN was a conservative party which eventually joined the European People's Party through The People of Freedom, and Lega Nord was supportive of a "Europe of Regions".

After the 2009 European elections the group officially had 35 members but this figure included parties such as AN and FF, which had already committed to leave. UEN members migrated to other groups after the elections in June 2009 and before the Seventh European Parliament term started on 14 July 2009. FF had already left for the Alliance of Liberals and Democrats for Europe (ALDE) Group, For Fatherland and Freedom/LNNK and Law and Justice MEPs went to the European Conservatives and Reformists Group (ECR Group), and Lega Nord, the Danish People's Party and Order and Justice MEPs went to Europe of Freedom and Democracy (EFD) Group. With this loss of members, the UEN group was dissolved by default.

== Membership ==
=== 1999–2004 ===
| Country | Name | | Ideology | MEPs |
|---|---|---|---|---|
| France | Rally for France | RPF | Gaullism; National conservatism | 12 / 87 |
| Italy | National Alliance | AN | National conservatism Post-fascism | 8 / 87 |
| Italy | Segni Pact | PS | Christian democracy Economic liberalism | 1 / 87 |
| Ireland | Fianna Fáil | FF | Irish republicanism Conservatism | 6 / 15 |
| Portugal | CDS – People's Party | CDS–PP | Conservatism; Christian democracy | 2 / 25 |
| Denmark | Danish People's Party | DF | Danish nationalism Right-wing populism | 1 / 16 |

=== 2004–2009 ===
| Country | Name | | Ideology | MEPs |
|---|---|---|---|---|
| Denmark | Danish People's Party | DF | Danish nationalism Right-wing populism | 1 / 14 |
| Ireland | Fianna Fáil | FF | Irish republicanism Conservatism | 4 / 13 |
| Italy | National Alliance | AN | National conservatism Post-fascism | 8 / 78 |
| Italy | Lega Nord | LN | Regionalism; Right-wing populism | 4 / 78 |
| Italy | The Right | LD | Neo-fascism; National conservatism | 1 / 78 |
| Latvia | For Fatherland and Freedom/LNNK | TB/LNNK | National conservatism Economic liberalism | 4 / 9 |
| Lithuania | Lithuanian Peasant Popular Union | LVLS | Social conservatism Agrarianism | 1 / 13 |
| Lithuania | Order and Justice | TT | National conservatism Right-wing populism | 1 / 13 |
| Poland | Law and Justice | PiS | National conservatism Right-wing populism | 8 / 54 |
| Poland | League of Polish Families | LPR | National conservatism Political Catholicism | 5 / 54 |
| Poland | Self-Defence of the Republic of Poland | SRP | Agrarian socialism Left-wing populism | 3 / 54 |
| Poland | Polish People's Party "Piast" | PSL Piast | Christian democracy Agrarianism | 3 / 54 |

=== 2009 ===
| Country | Name | | Ideology | MEPs |
|---|---|---|---|---|
| Denmark | Danish People's Party | DF | Danish nationalism Right-wing populism | 2 / 13 |
| Poland | Law and Justice | PiS | National conservatism Right-wing populism | 15 / 50 |
| Italy | Lega Nord | LN | Regionalism; Right-wing populism | 9 / 72 |
| Ireland | Fianna Fáil | FF | Conservatism; Populism | 3 / 12 |
| Latvia | For Fatherland and Freedom/LNNK | TB/LNNK | National conservatism Economic liberalism | 1 / 9 |
| Lithuania | Order and Justice | TT | National conservatism Right-wing populism | 2 / 12 |
| Slovakia | Slovak National Party | SNS | Ultranationalism; Right-wing populism | 1 / 13 |
