= 2004 European Parliament election in Latvia =

- 12 June 2004

9 seats to the European Parliament

The election of MEPs representing Latvia constituency for the 2004–2009 term of the European Parliament was held on 12 June 2004. It was the first European Parliament election in Latvia following its admission to the European Union in May 2004. It was part of the wider 2004 European election.

There were lists of candidates from 16 political parties. with a total of 1019 candidates. The voter turnout was 41.20%, with 574,674 voters casting votes. It was significantly lower than the usual turnout for Latvian parliamentary elections (which has been between 71% and 73% for previous three elections) but higher than the turnout in most of other countries which joined EU together with Latvia in 2004.

The election was conducted according to party-list proportional representation system, with at least 5% of votes necessary to gain seats in the parliament. Out of 16 parties, five won seats in the European Parliament. Several parties narrowly missed the 5% threshold.

== Results ==
The elections were a major loss for the coalition government in power, as the three coalition parties together won only 14.2% of popular vote. Tautas Partija was the only coalition party to win a seat.

The winning party Tēvzemei un Brīvībai/LNNK had most votes in 22 of 26 counties and 5 of 7 cities. The exception was Southeast Latvia (Daugavpils, Krāslava and Rezekne districts and cities of Daugavpils and Rēzekne) which were won by the Par Cilvēka Tiesībām Vienotā Latvijā party and Ludza district won by Socialist Party of Latvia, due to large percentage of ethnically Russian voters in this area.

Party	Votes	%	Seats
For Fatherland and Freedom/LNNK	171,859	30.08	4
New Era Party	113,593	19.88	2
For Human Rights in United Latvia	61,401	10.75	1
People's Party	38,324	6.71	1
Latvian Way	37,724	6.60	1
National Harmony Party	27,506	4.81	0
Latvian Social Democratic Workers' Party	27,468	4.81	0
Union of Greens and Farmers	24,467	4.28	0
Latvia's First Party	18,685	3.27	0
United Social Democratic Welfare Party	12,871	2.25	0
Conservative Party	9,716	1.70	0
Socialist Party of Latvia	9,480	1.66	0
Light of Latgale	8,439	1.48	0
Eurosceptics	5,481	0.96	0
Christian Democratic Union	2,362	0.41	0
Social Democratic Union	1,988	0.35	0
Total	571,364	100.00	9
Valid votes	571,364	98.87	
Invalid/blank votes	6,517	1.13	
Total votes	577,881	100.00	
Registered voters/turnout	1,397,736	41.34	
Source: CVK, European Elections Database

=== Elected MEPs ===
Elected MEPs
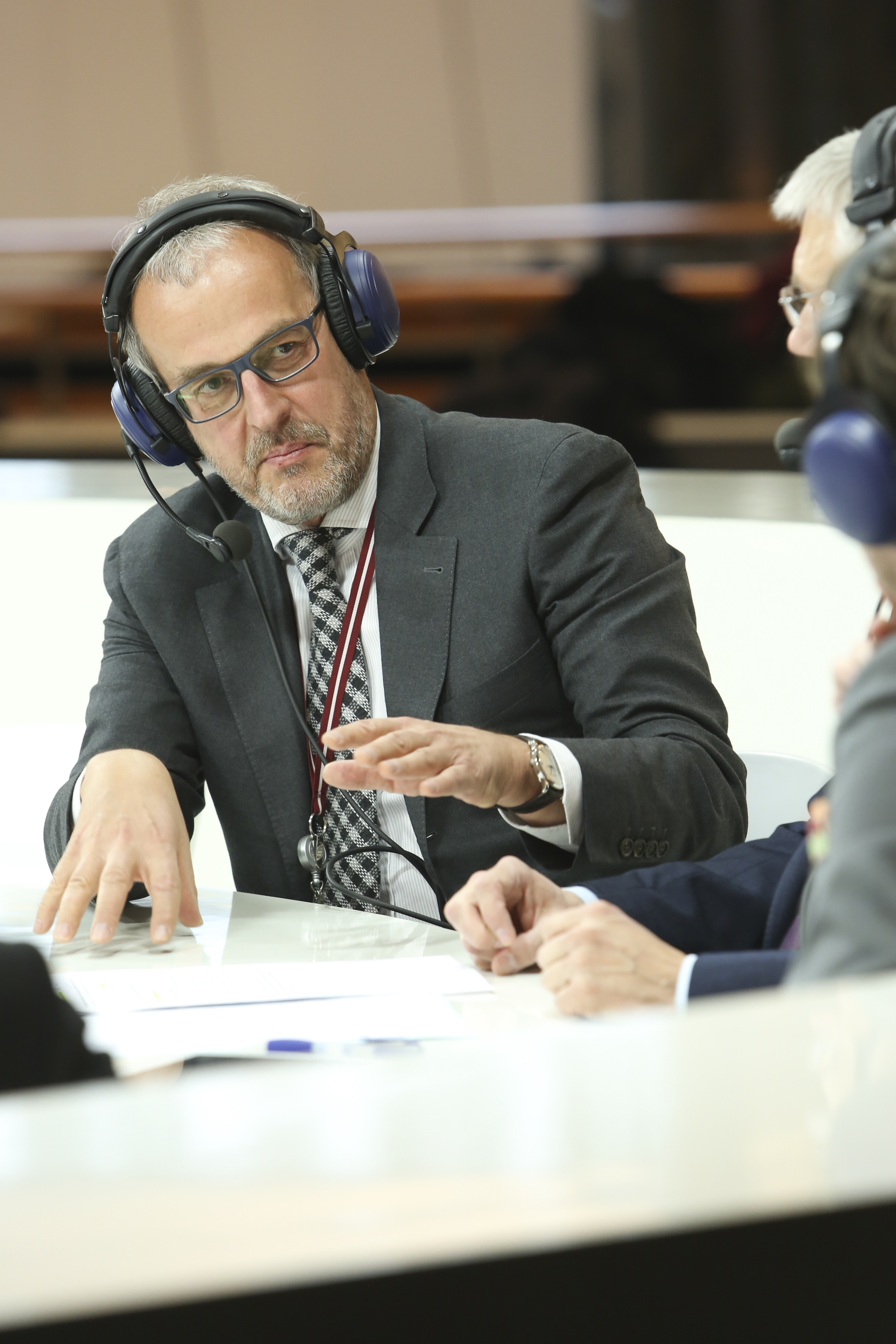
Roberts Zīle (TB/LNNK)

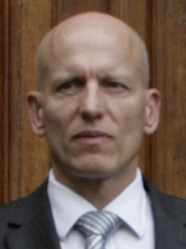
Guntars Krasts (TB/LNNK)

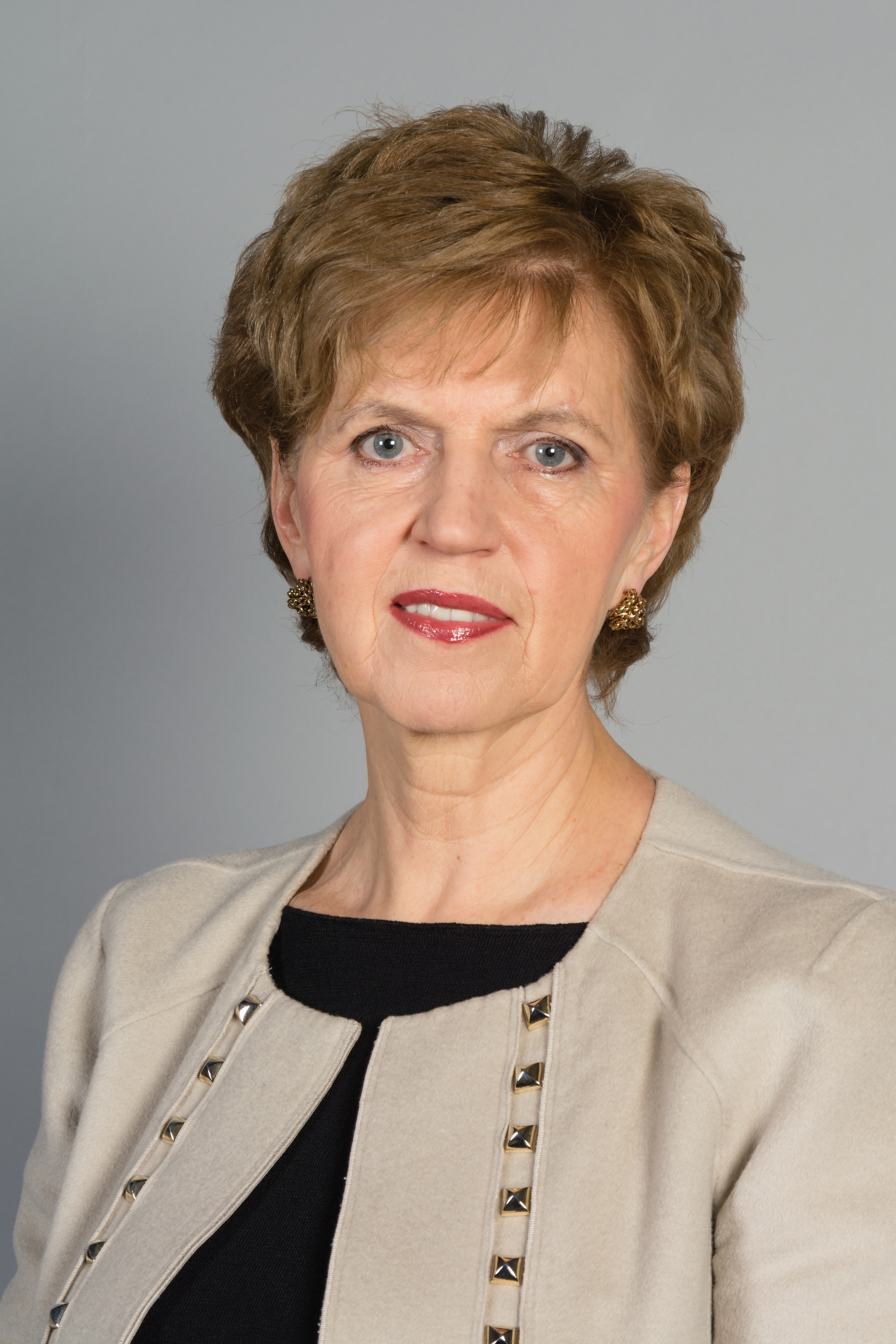
Inese Vaidere (TB/LNNK)

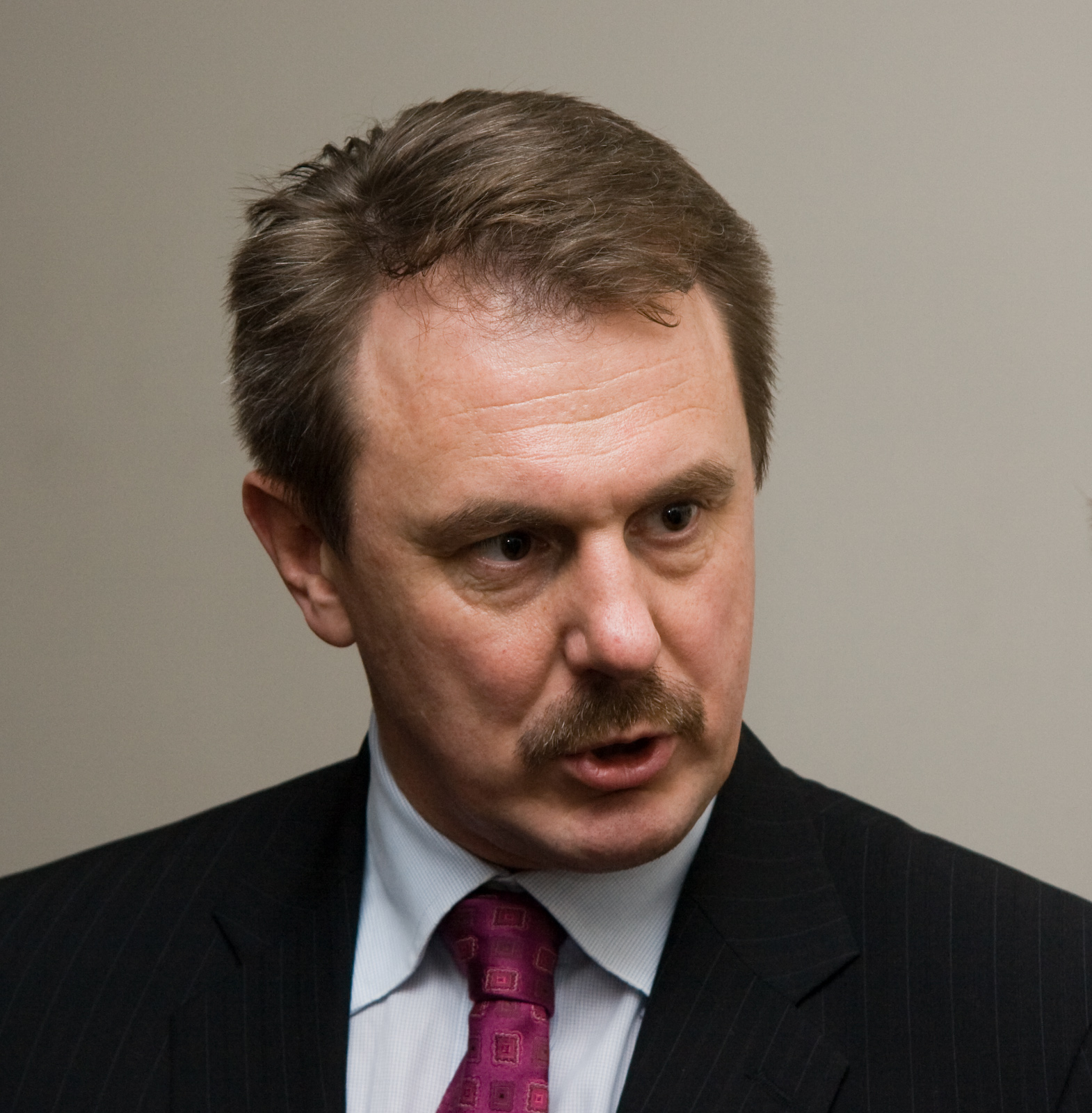
Ģirts Valdis Kristovskis (TB/LNNK)

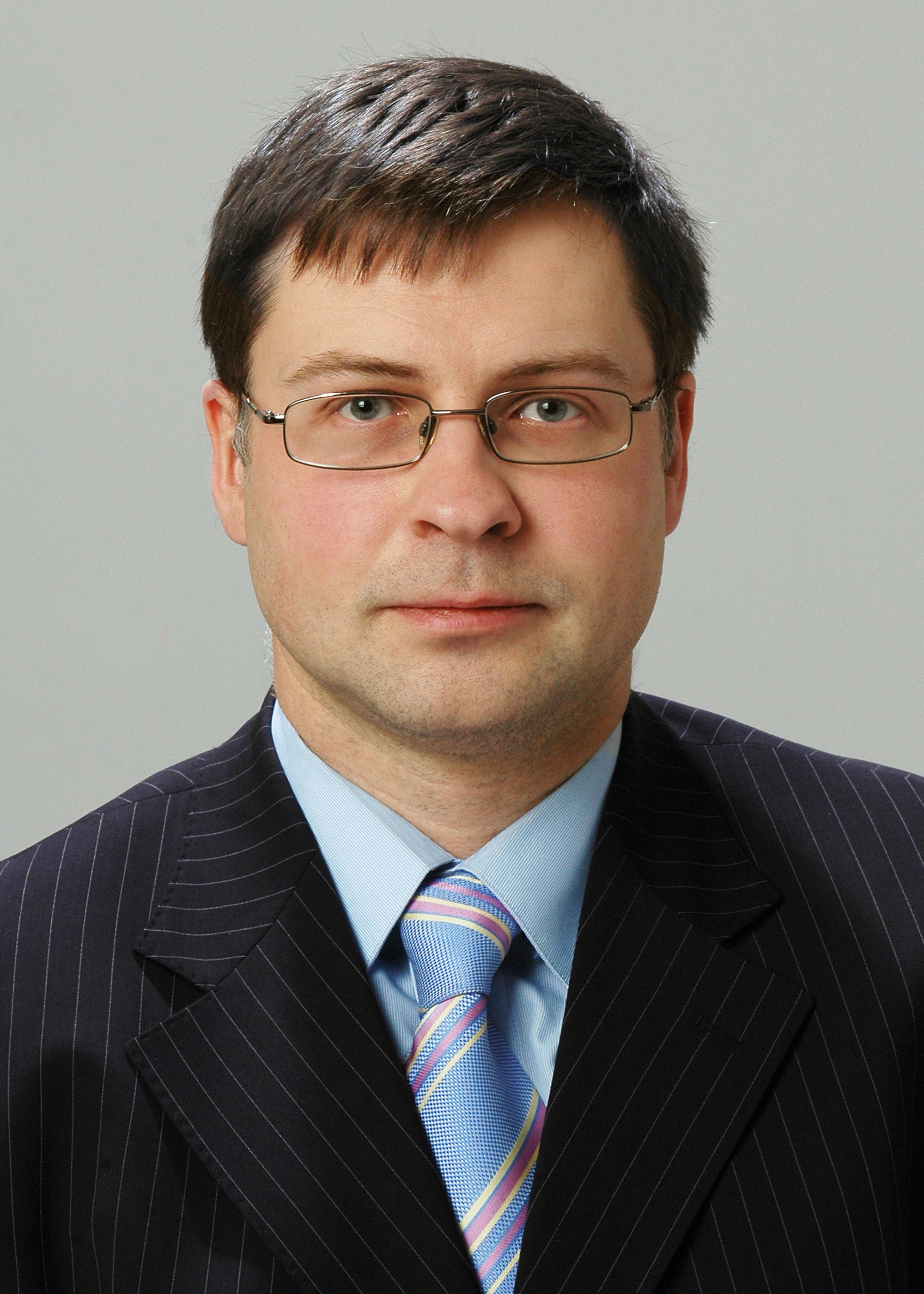
Valdis Dombrovskis (JL)

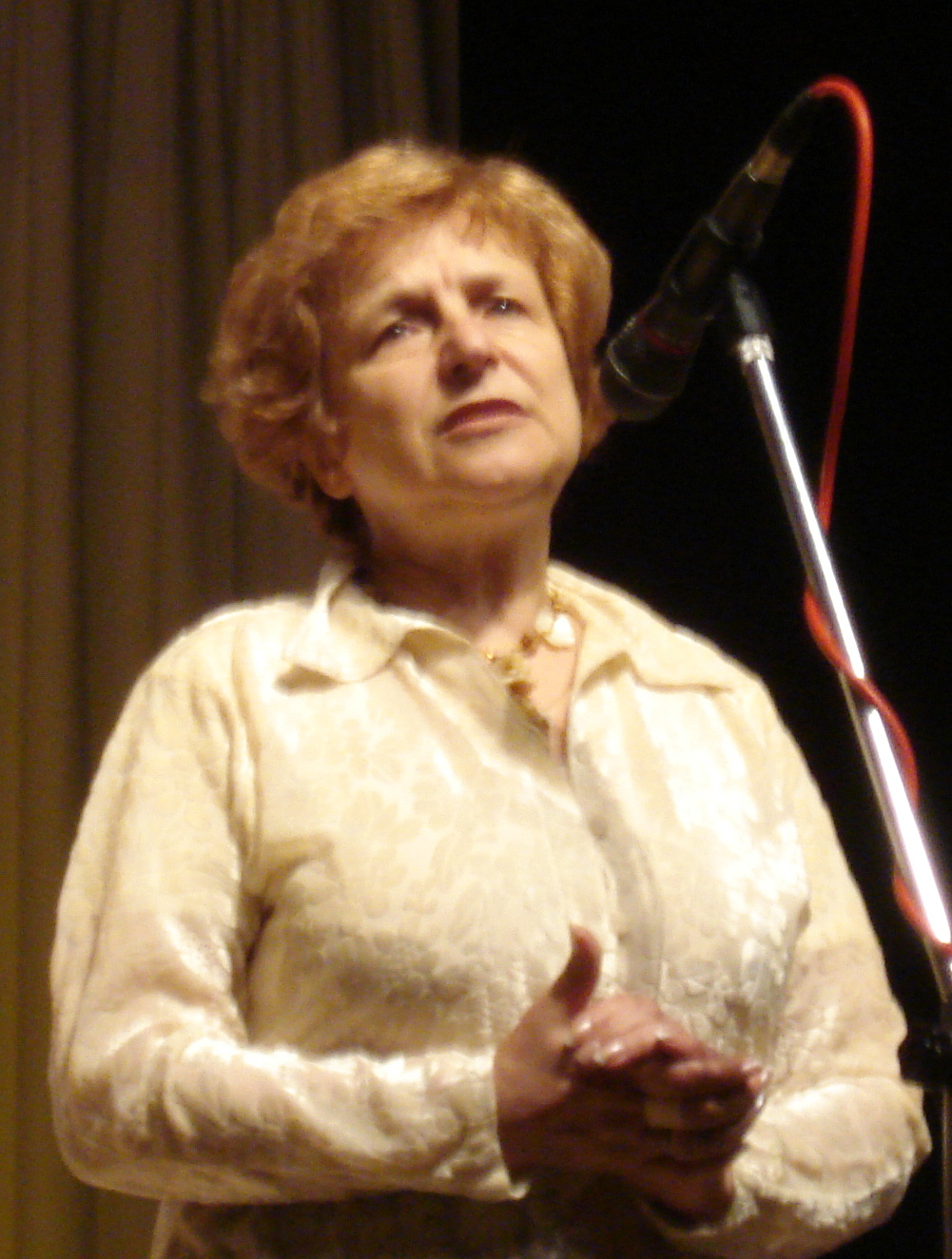
Tatjana Ždanoka (PCTVL)

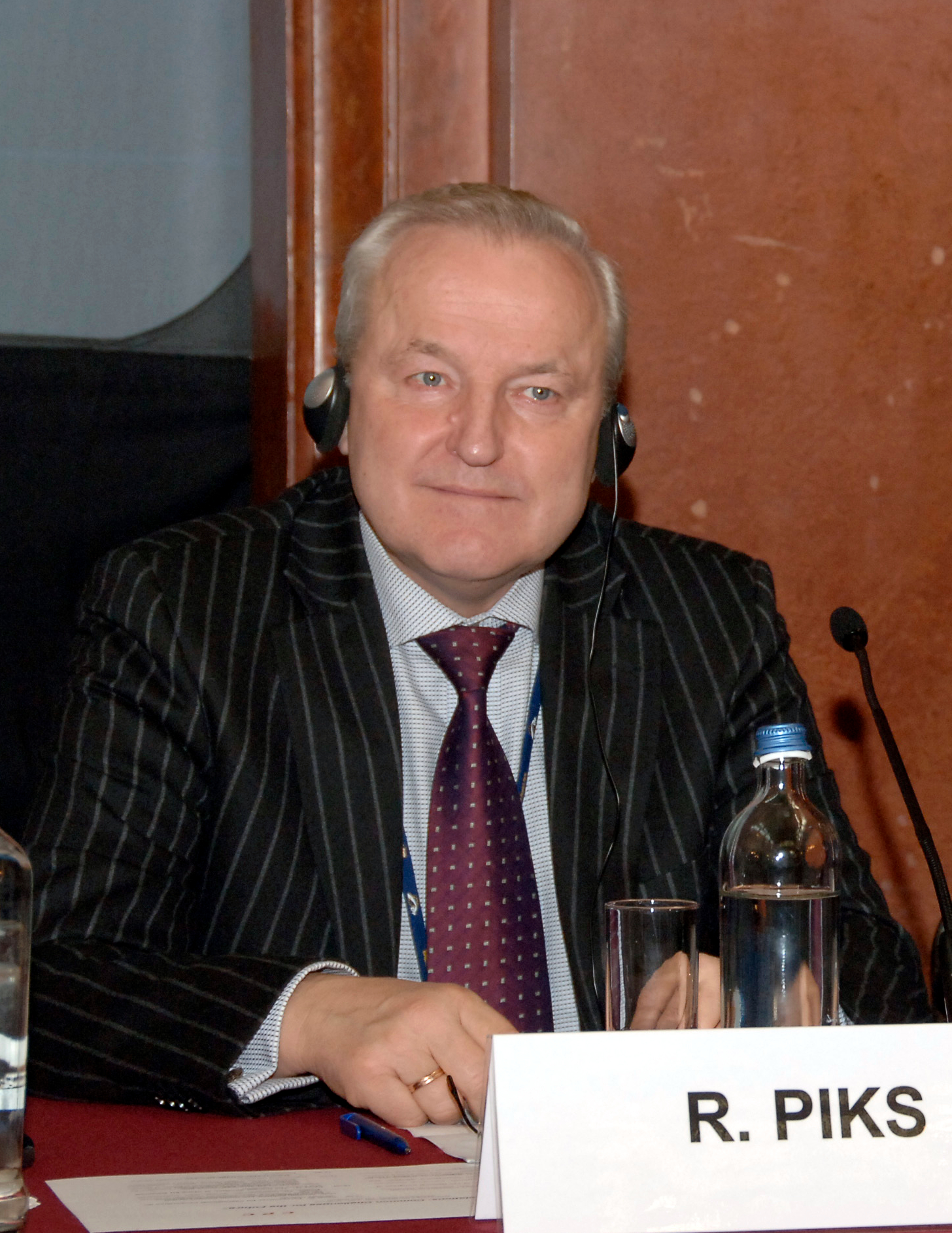
Rihards Pīks (TP)

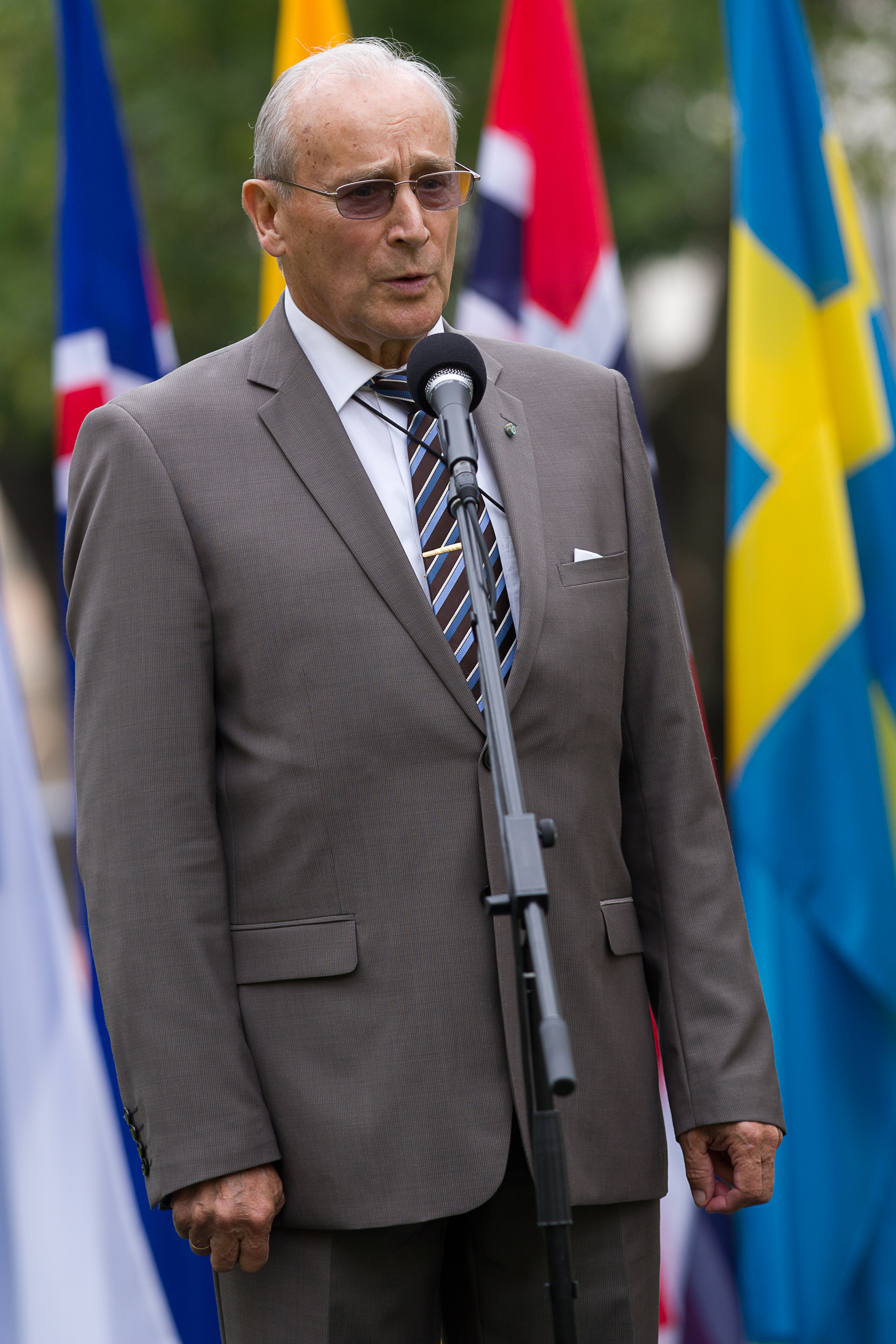
Georgs Andrejevs (LC)

== See also ==
- Politics of Latvia
