= 2019 European Parliament election in Latvia =

← 2014	25 May 2019	2024 →

All 8 Latvian seats in the European Parliament
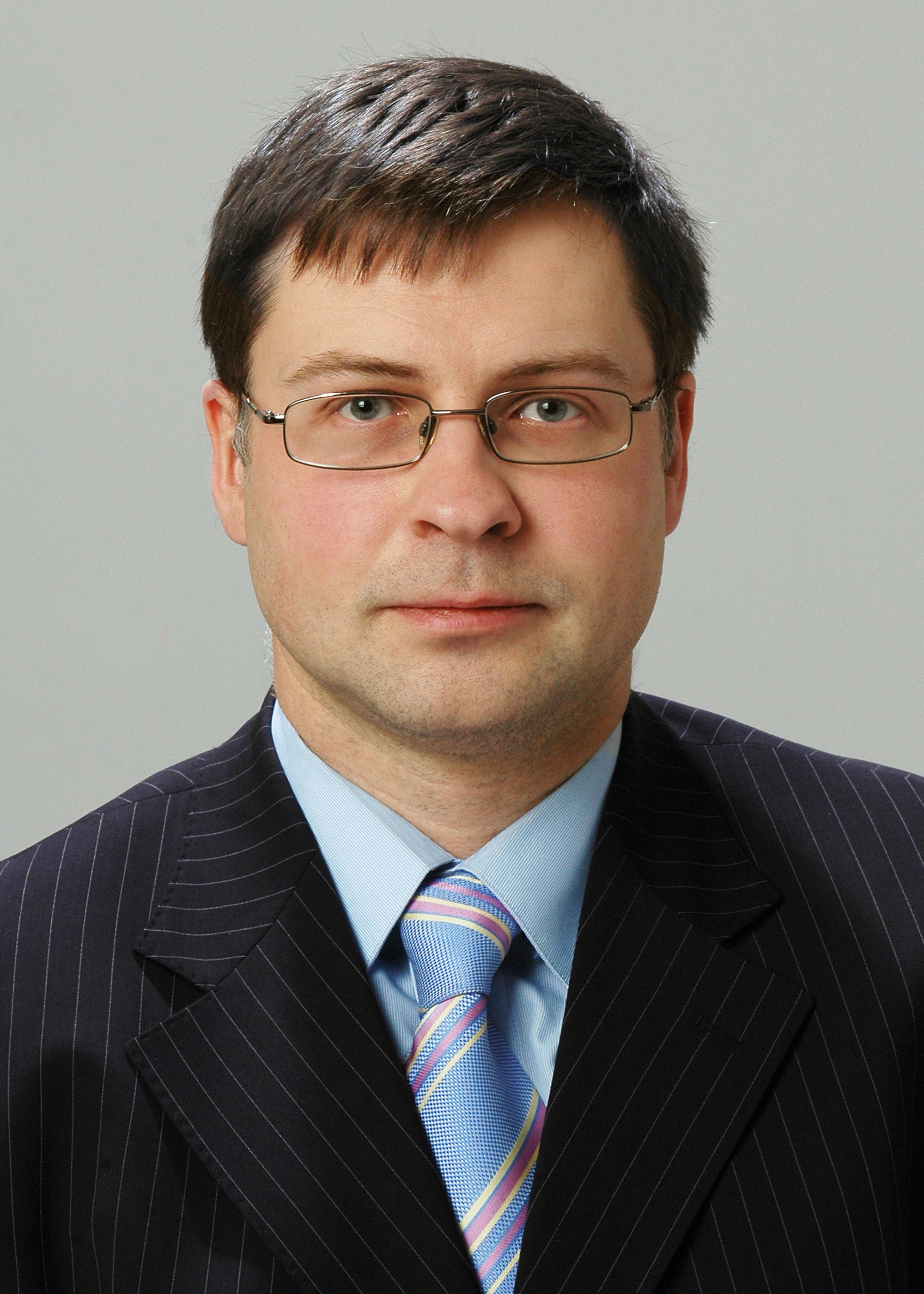

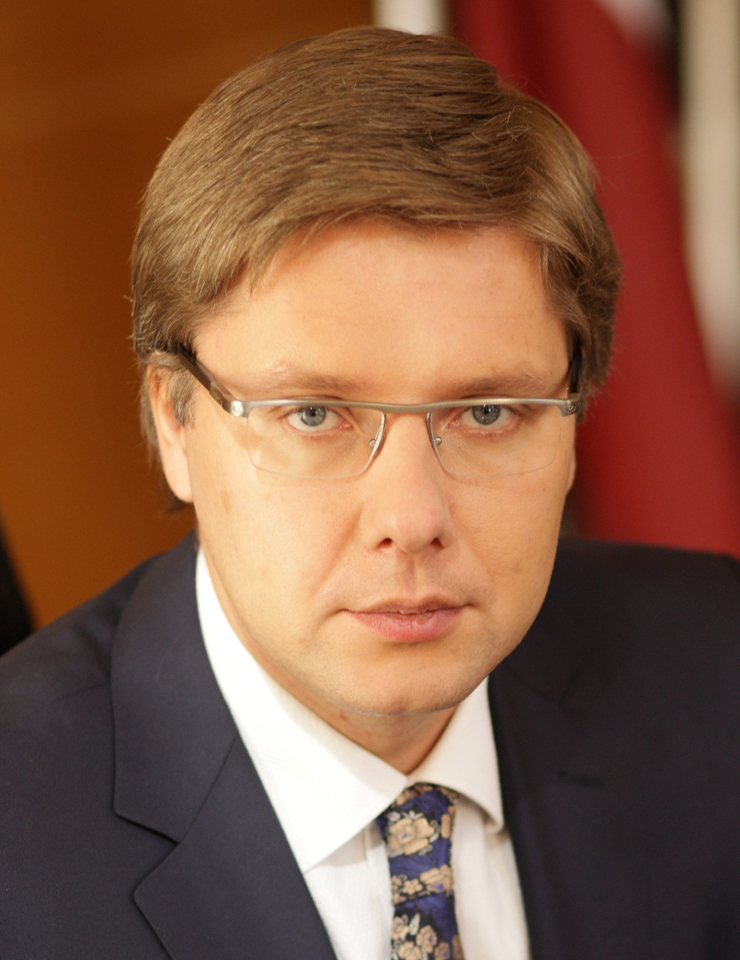

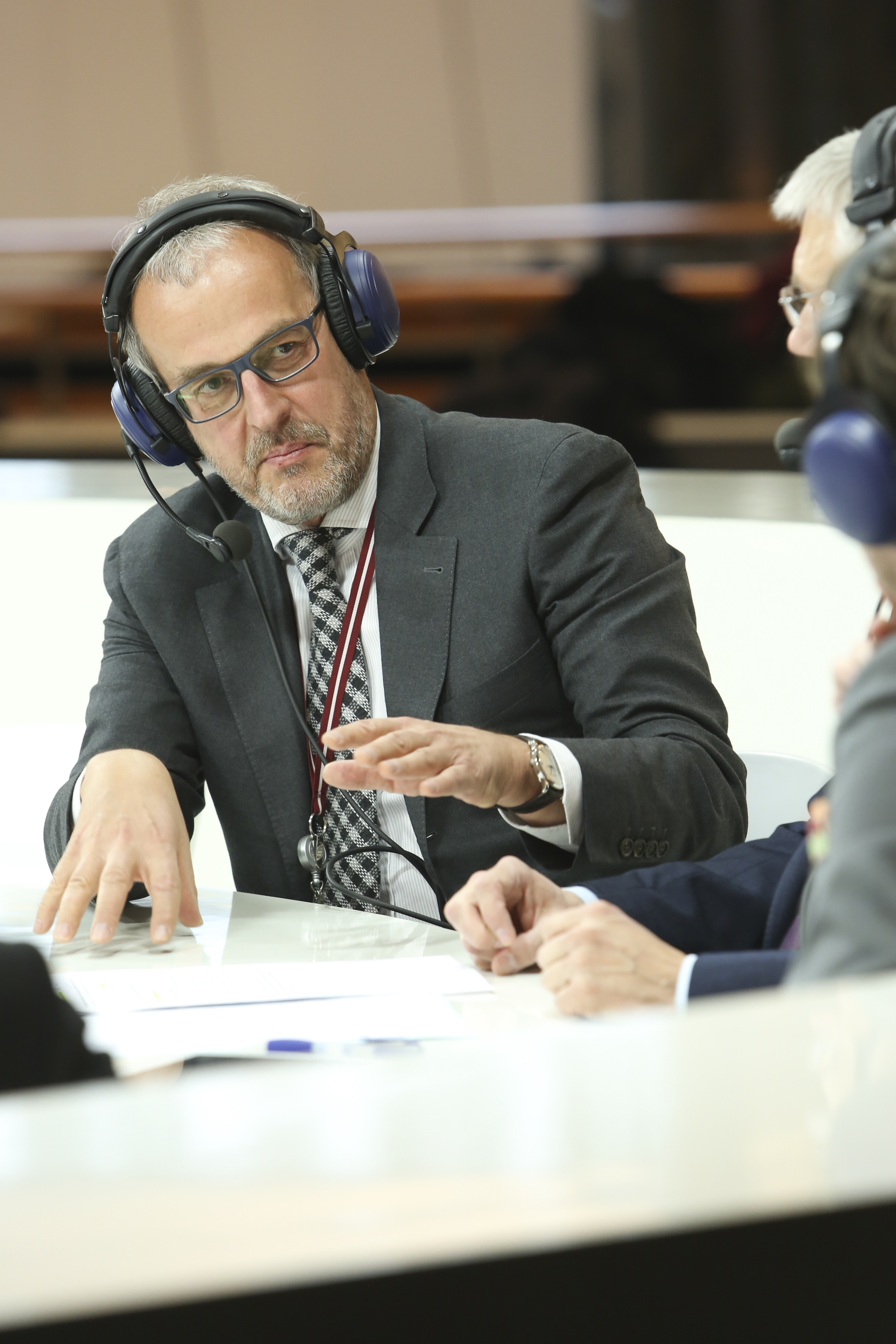

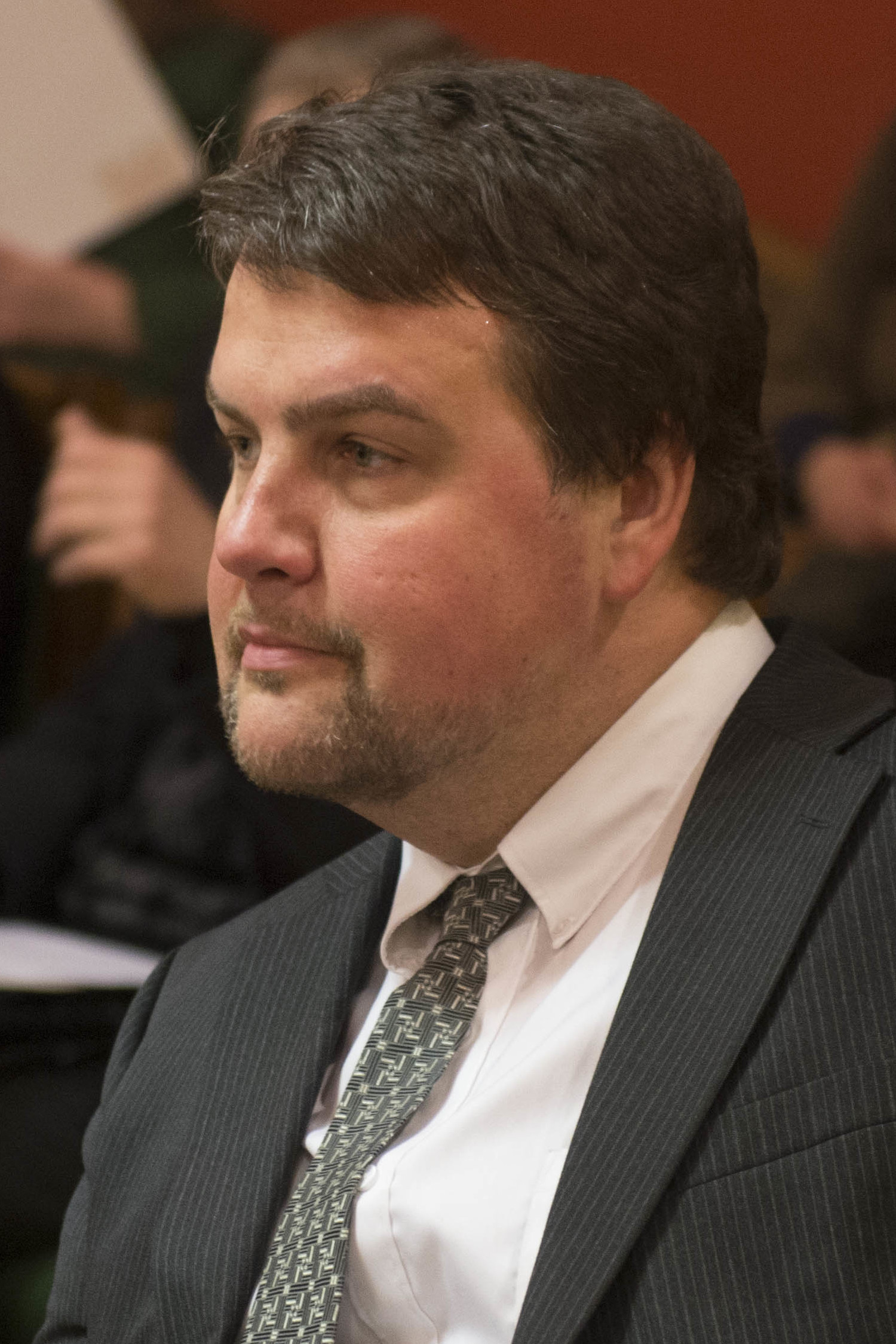

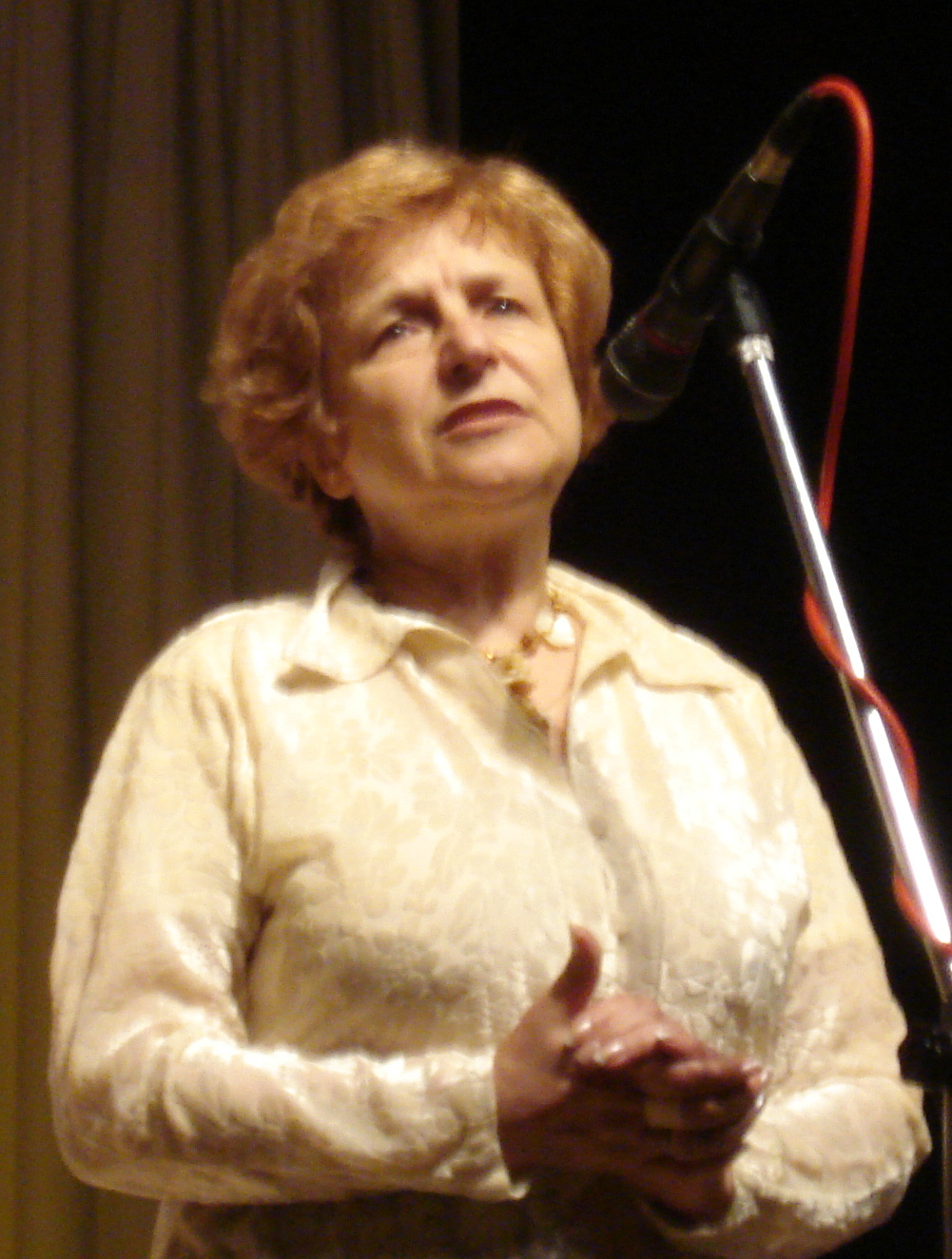
	First party	Second party	Third party
Leader	Valdis Dombrovskis	Nils Ušakovs	Roberts Zīle
Party	New Unity	Harmony	National Alliance
Alliance	EPP	SD	ECR
Last election	4 seats, 46.56% (Unity)	1 seat, 13.14%	1 seat, 14.36%
Seats after	2	2	2
Seat change	▼2	▲1	▲1
Popular vote	124,193	82,604	77,591
Percentage	26.40%	17.56%	16.49%
Swing	▼20.16pp	▲4.42pp	▲2.13pp
	Fourth party	Fifth party
Leader	Ivars Ijabs	Tatjana Ždanoka
Party	Development/For!	Latvian Russian Union
Alliance	ALDE	G-EFA
Last election	–	1 seat, 6.43%
Seats after	1	1
Seat change	New	Steady
Popular vote	58,763	29,546
Percentage	12.49%	6.28%
Swing	New	▼0.18pp

An election of the delegation from Latvia to the European Parliament was held on 25 May 2019. The previous elections were held in 2014.

The election uses the Sainte-Laguë method, which is weighted against the larger parties. That explains why, according to the results of one opinion poll, parties with 6% of the vote would be allocated one seat each, while a party with 17% of the vote would also be allocated only one seat.

== Participating parties ==
№	List title	Title in Latvian
1	Latvian Russian Union	Latvijas Krievu savienība
2	Latvian Nationalists	Latviešu Nacionālisti
3	Latvian Association of Regions	Latvijas Reģionu apvienība
4	Union of Greens and Farmers: Latvian Farmer's Union; Latvian Green Party	Zaļo un Zemnieku savienība: Latvijas Zemnieku savienība; Latvijas Zaļā partija
5	KPV LV (Who owns the state?)	KPV LV
6	Progressives	Progresīvie
7	New Harmony	Jaunā Saskaņa
8	New Conservative Party	Jaunā konservatīvā partija
9	Development/For!: For Latvia's Development; Movement For!; Growth	Attīstībai/Par!: Latvijas attīstībai; Kustība "Par!"; Izaugsme
10	SDP "Harmony"	Sociāldemokrātiskā partija "Saskaņa"
11	National Alliance	Nacionālā apvienība „Visu Latvijai!” – „Tēvzemei un Brīvībai/LNNK”
12	Action Party	Rīcības partija
13	Awakening: For Latvia from the Heart; Christian Democratic Union; Honor to Serve Our Latvia	Atmoda: No sirds Latvijai; Kristīgi demokrātiskā savienība; Gods kalpot mūsu Latvijai
14	Center Party	Centra partija
15	Latvian Social Democratic Workers' Party	Latvijas Sociāldemokrātiskā strādnieku partija
16	New Unity: Unity; Latgale Party	Jaunā Vienotība: Vienotība; Latgales partija

== Opinion polls ==
Graphical summary

Fieldwork date	Commissioned by	Sample size	New Unity	NA	S	ZZS	LKS	KPV LV	JKP	AP!	LRA	P	Other	Don't know	Won't vote	Lead
21 May 2019	Berg Research	808	18,37% (2)	15,36% (1)	17,02% (2)	4,37%	7,38% (1)	1,05%	4,52%	9,94% (1)	7,68% (1)	3,77%	1,50%	9,04%	—	1,35%
14–20 May 2019	Factum	915	16,1% (1)	17,1% (2)	14,3% (1)	9,3% (1)	4,8%	3,0%	9,5% (1)	10,4% (1)	4,6%	7,1% (1)	3,8%	—	—	1,0%
2–9 May 2019	Factum	948	13% (1)	17% (1)	15% (1)	8% (1)	5%	3%	11% (1)	11% (1)	6% (1)	6% (1)	5%	—	—	3%
29 Apr–6 May 2019	SKDS/Latvijas Televīzija	918	10.8% (2)	9.0% (1)	14.0% (2)	3.8%	6.9% (1)	1.1%	3.2%	10.9% (2)	2.0%	4.3%	2.1%	18.0%	13.9%	3.1%
24–28 Apr 2019	Factum	895	13% (1)	15% (1)	18% (2)	8% (1)	4%	3%	11% (1)	12% (1)	5%	6% (1)	5%	—	—	3%
12–22 Apr 2019	Latvijas Fakti	1046	6.1% (1)	6.5% (2)	11.4% (3)	5.8% (1)	2.4%	1.9%	4.9%	5.8% (1)	2.6%	1.4%	29.0%	18.0%	3.6%	4.9%
17–21 Apr 2019	Factum	512	15% (1)	16% (1)	18% (2)	8% (1)	4%	3%	10% (1)	11% (1)	4%	7% (1)	4%	—	—	2%
11–16 Apr 2019	SKDS/Latvijas Televīzija	912	11.7% (2)	8.1% (1)	15.0% (2)	3.7%	5.0% (1)	0.6%	2.4%	10.6% (2)	1.7%	4.5%	1%	19.2%	16.3%	3.3%
1–7 Apr 2019	Factum	542	16% (1)	13% (1)	19% (2)	10% (1)	5%	3%	10% (1)	10% (1)	4%	5% (1)	3%	—	—	4%
26 Mar–5 Apr 2019	Factum	1206	15% (1)	14% (1)	19% (2)	9% (1)	5%	3%	9% (1)	11% (1)	4%	6% (1)	5%	—	—	4%
3–18 Mar 2019	Latvijas Fakti	907	26.8% (3)	13.4% (1)	20.7% (2)	14.6% (1)	4,9%	—	4,9%	9.8% (1)	4,9%	—	—	—	—	6.1%
18 Feb 2019	Kantar public	—	5.8%	11.3% (1)	25.4% (2)	11.8% (1)	1.2%	10.4% (1)	17.7% (2)	9.8% (1)	3.9%	2.3%	0.4%	—	—	8.2%
2014 elections			46.19% (4)	14.25% (1)	13.04% (1)	8.26% (1)	6.38% (1)	—	—	—	2.49%	—	9.39%			31.94%

== Results ==
Party	Votes	%	Seats	+/–
New Unity	124,193	26.40	2	–2
Social Democratic Party "Harmony"	82,604	17.56	2	+1
National Alliance	77,591	16.49	2	+1
Development/For!	58,763	12.49	1	New
Latvian Russian Union	29,546	6.28	1	0
Union of Greens and Farmers	25,252	5.37	0	–1
Latvian Association of Regions	23,581	5.01	0	0
New Conservative Party	20,595	4.38	0	New
The Progressives	13,705	2.91	0	New
Who Owns the State?	4,362	0.93	0	New
Latvian Nationalists	3,172	0.67	0	New
Centre Party	2,312	0.49	0	New
Awakening	2,242	0.48	0	New
Latvian Social Democratic Workers' Party	922	0.20	0	0
New Harmony	829	0.18	0	New
Action Party	791	0.17	0	New
Total	470,460	100.00	8	0
Valid votes	470,460	99.17		
Invalid/blank votes	3,930	0.83		
Total votes	474,390	100.00		
Registered voters/turnout	1,414,712	33.53		
Source: CVK

=== Elected MEPs ===
Elected MEPs
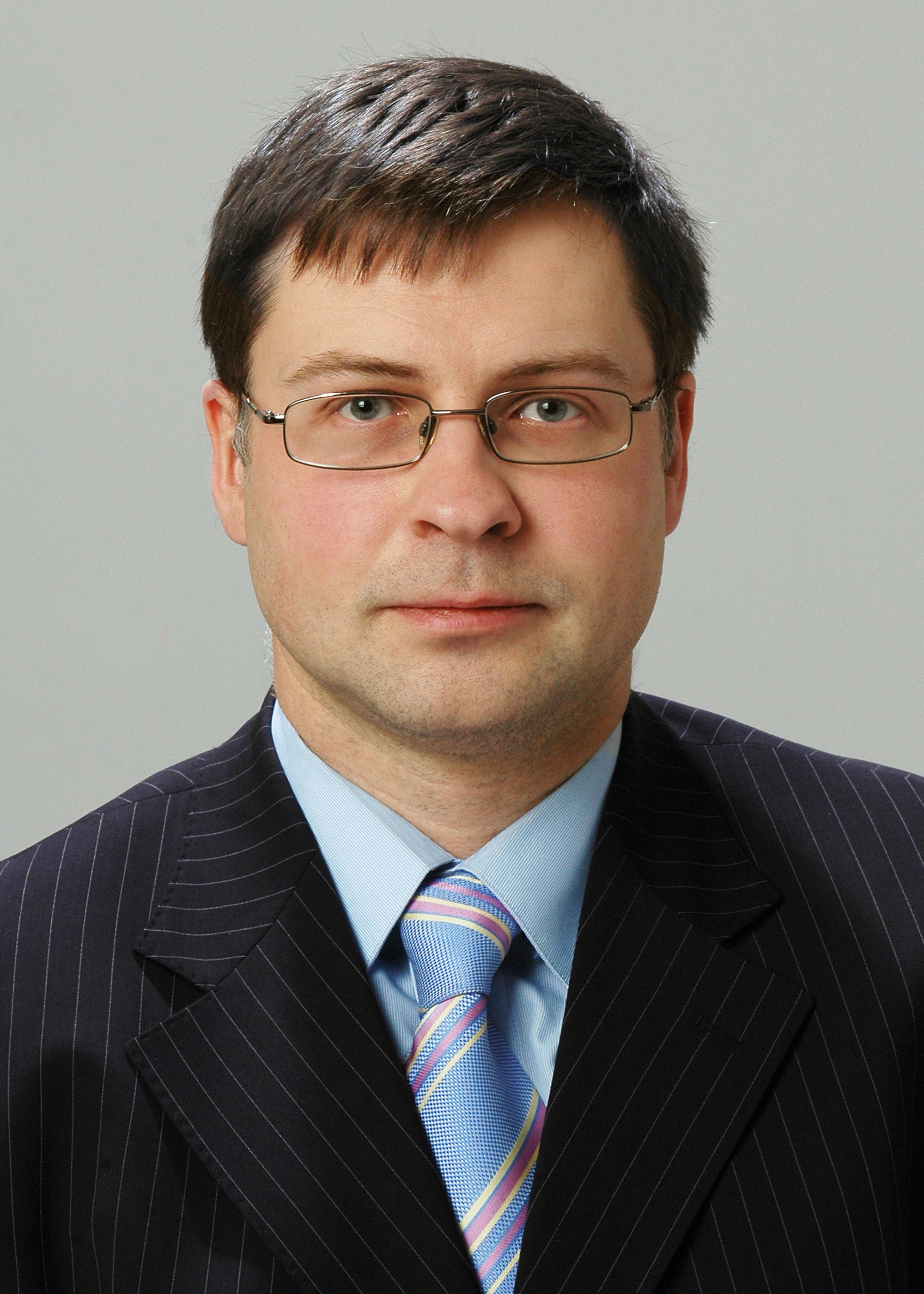
Valdis Dombrovskis (JV)

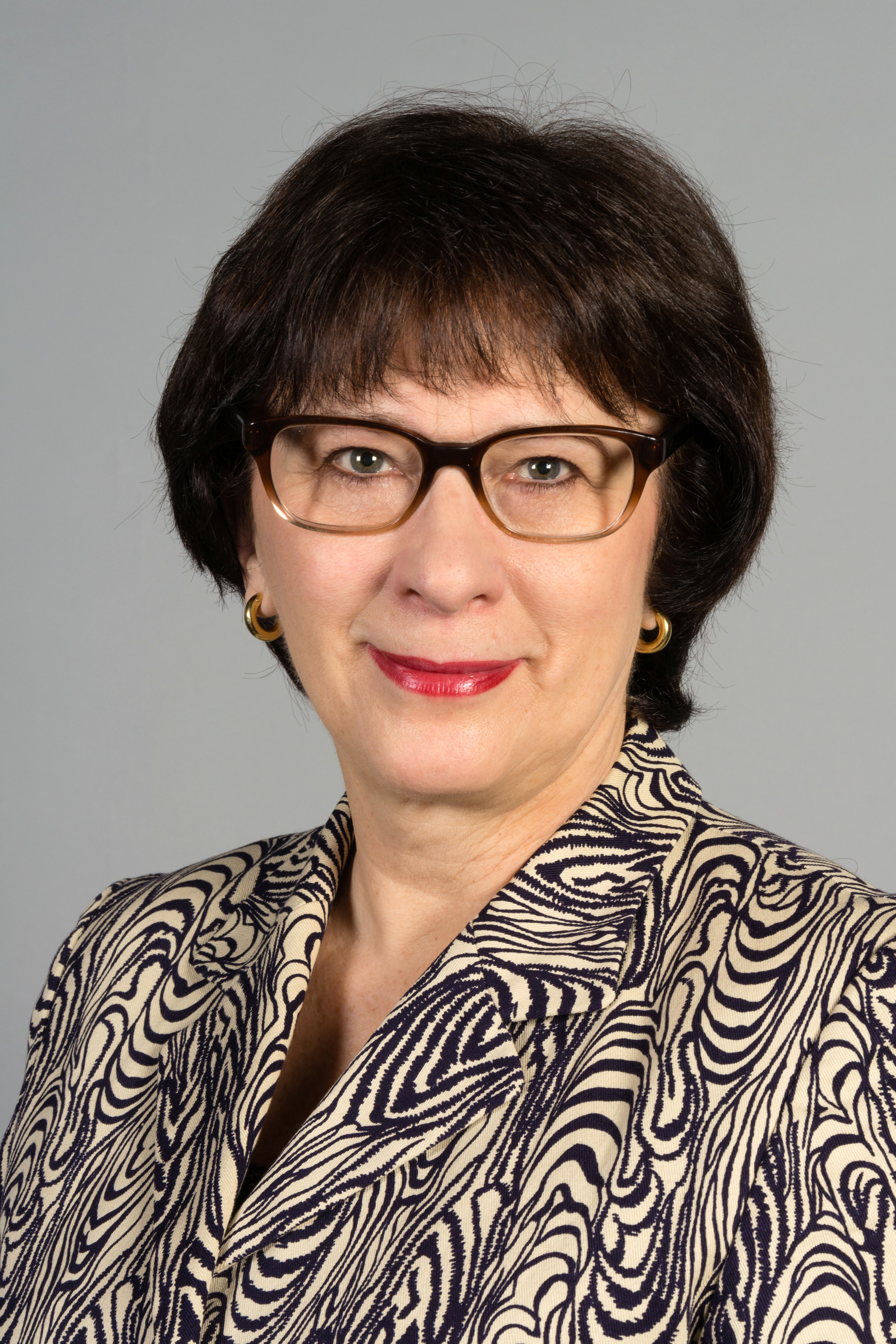
Sandra Kalniete (JV)

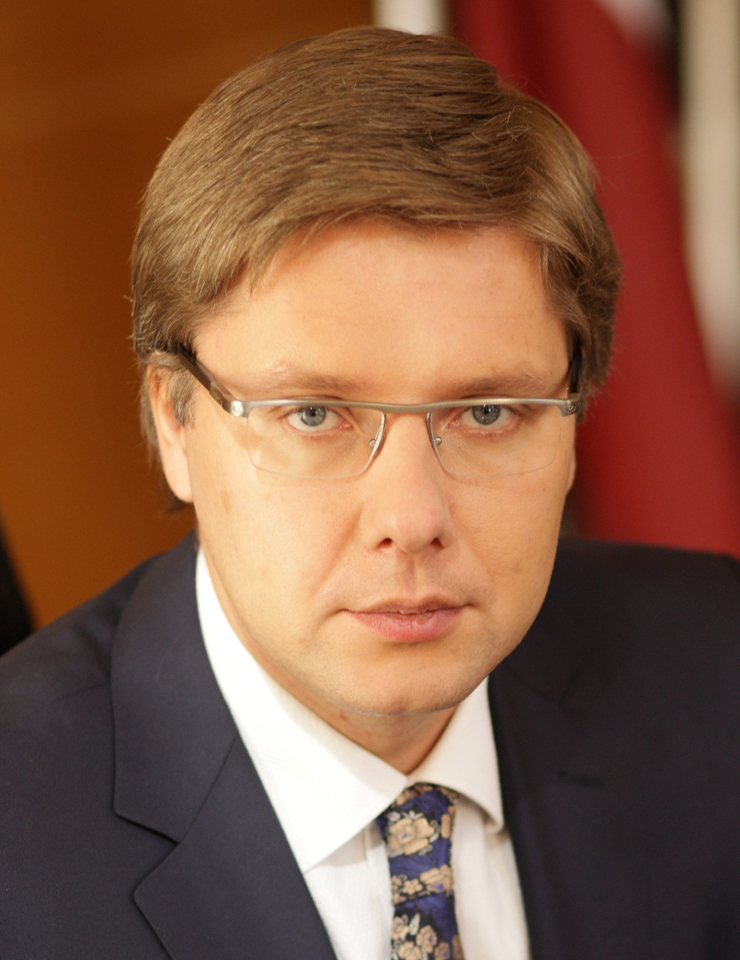
Nils Ušakovs (S)

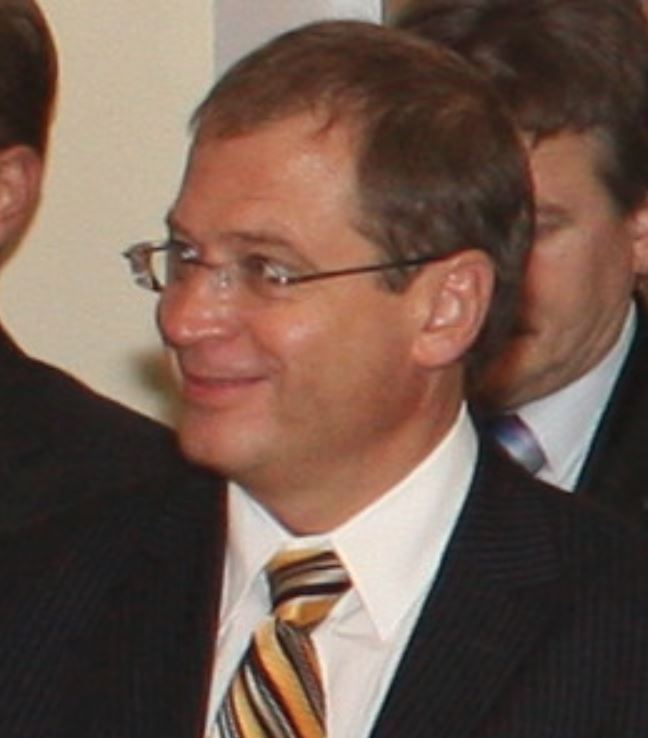
Andris Ameriks (S)

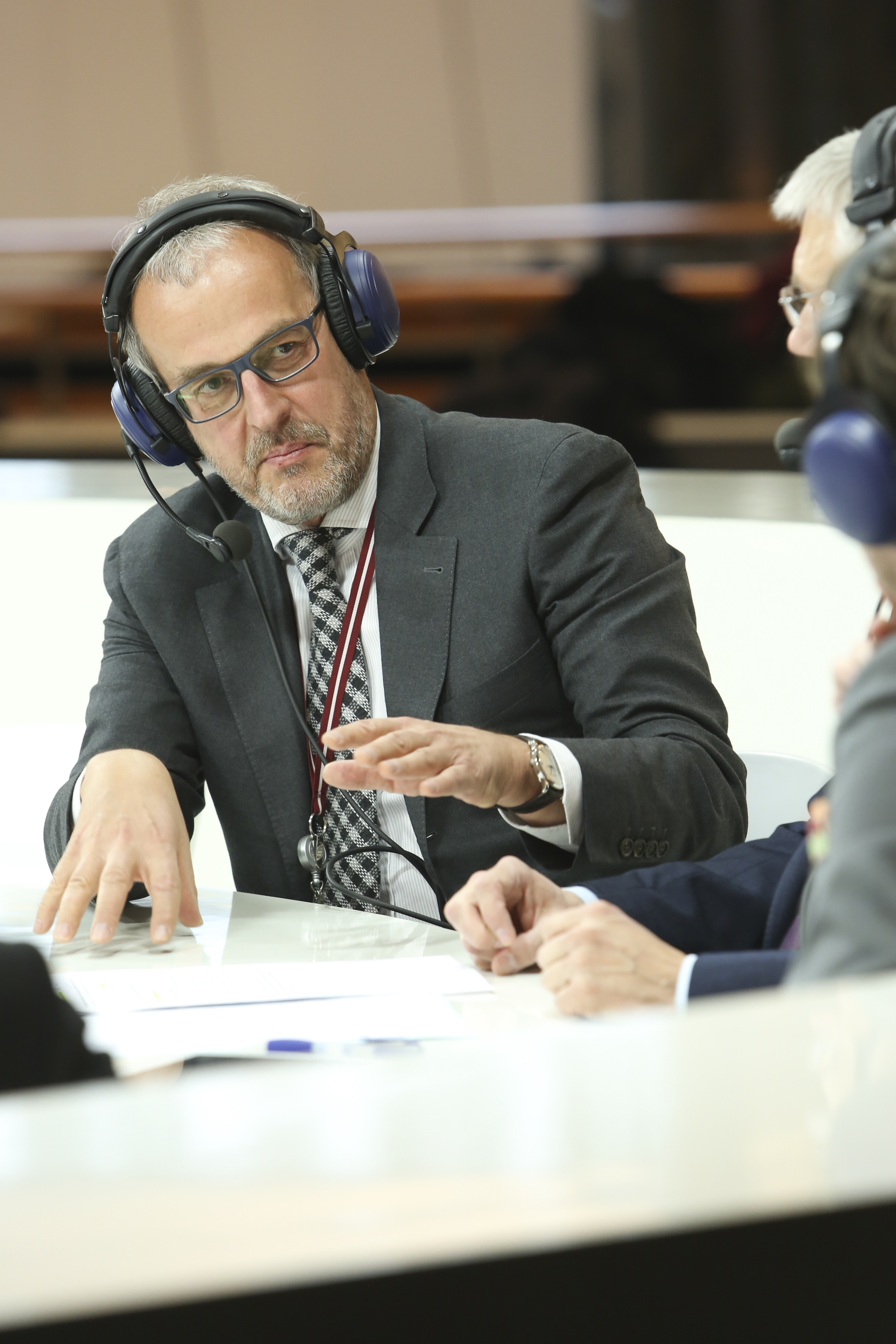
Roberts Zīle (NA)

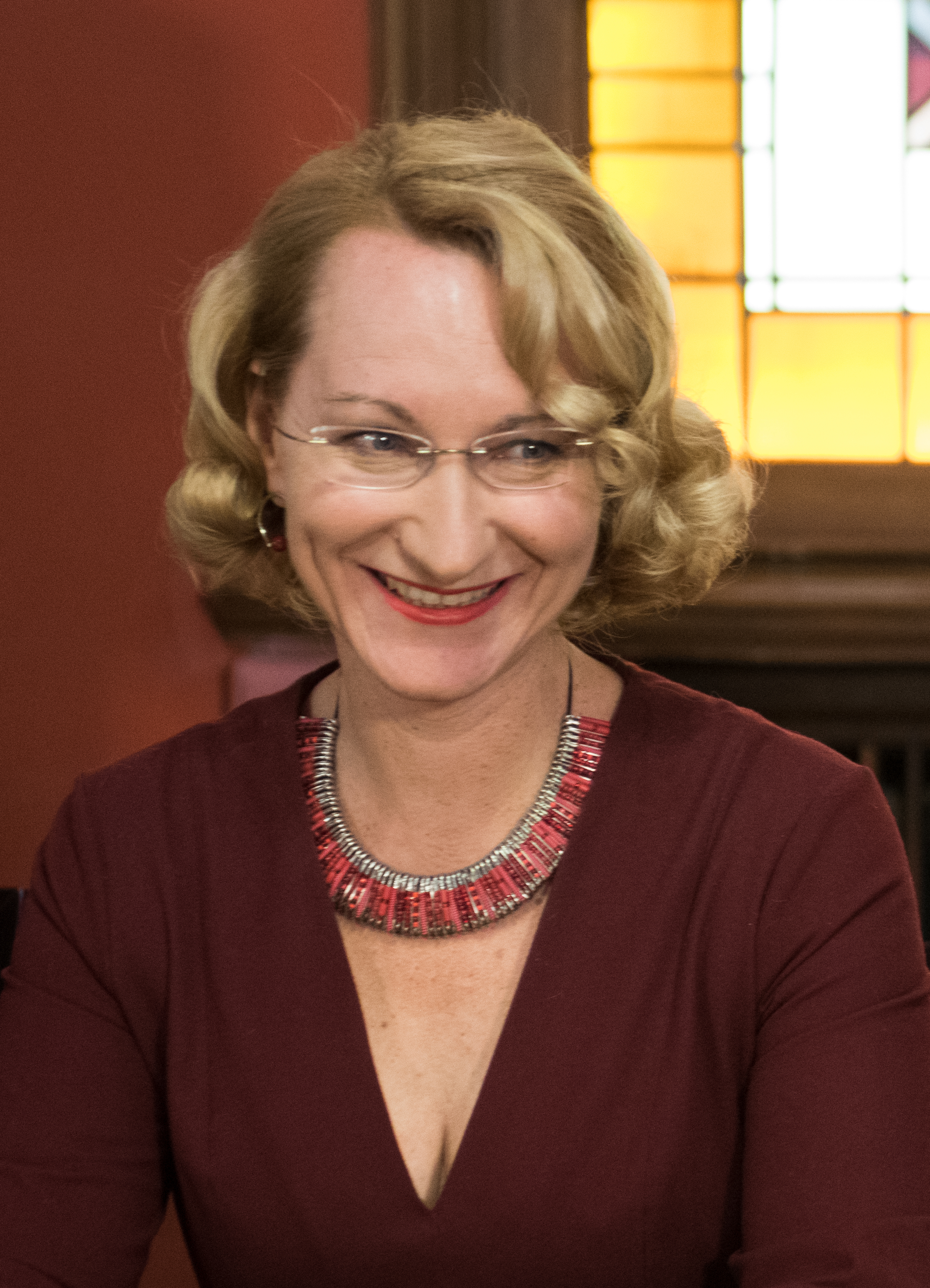
Dace Melbārde (NA)

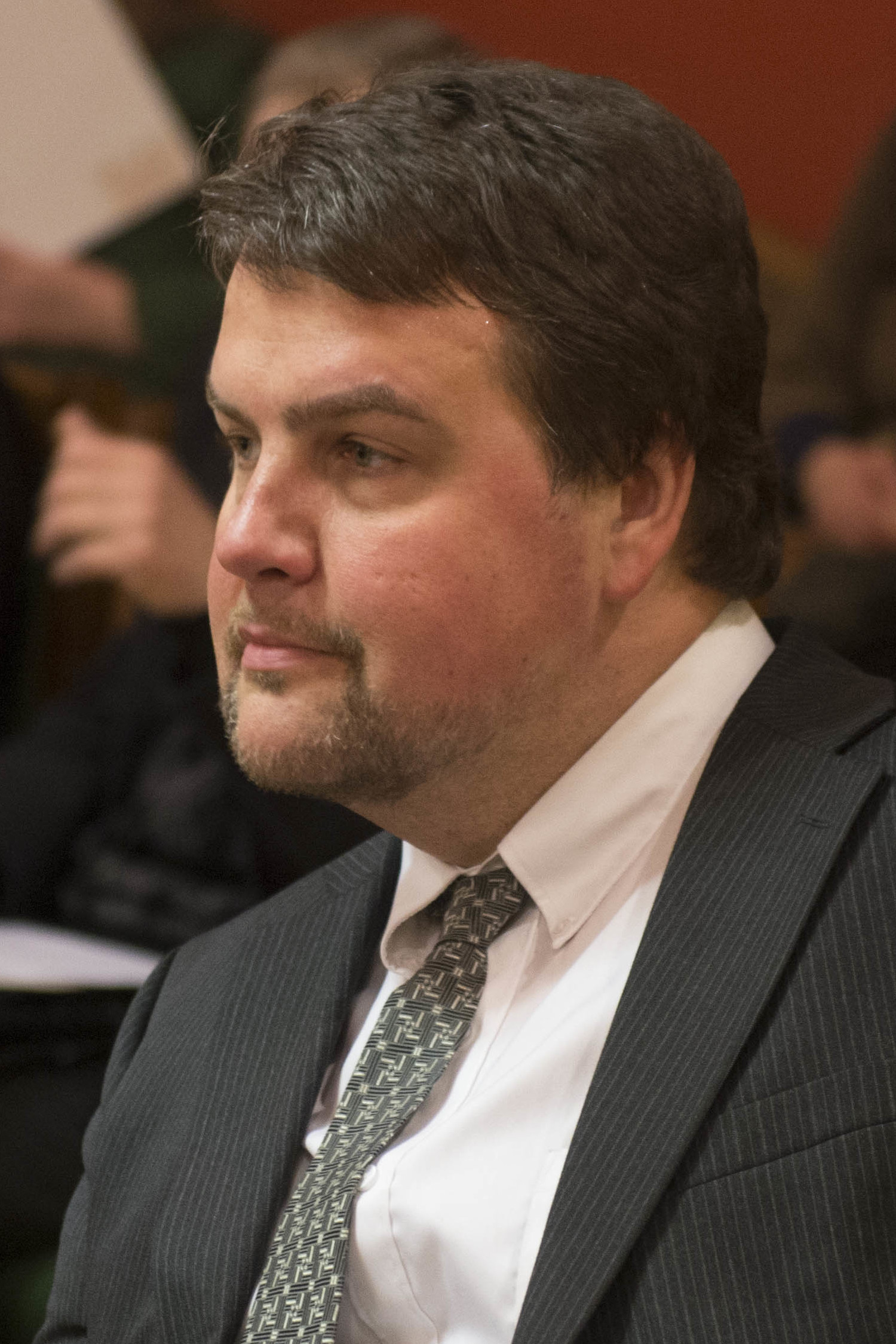
Ivars Ijabs (AP!)

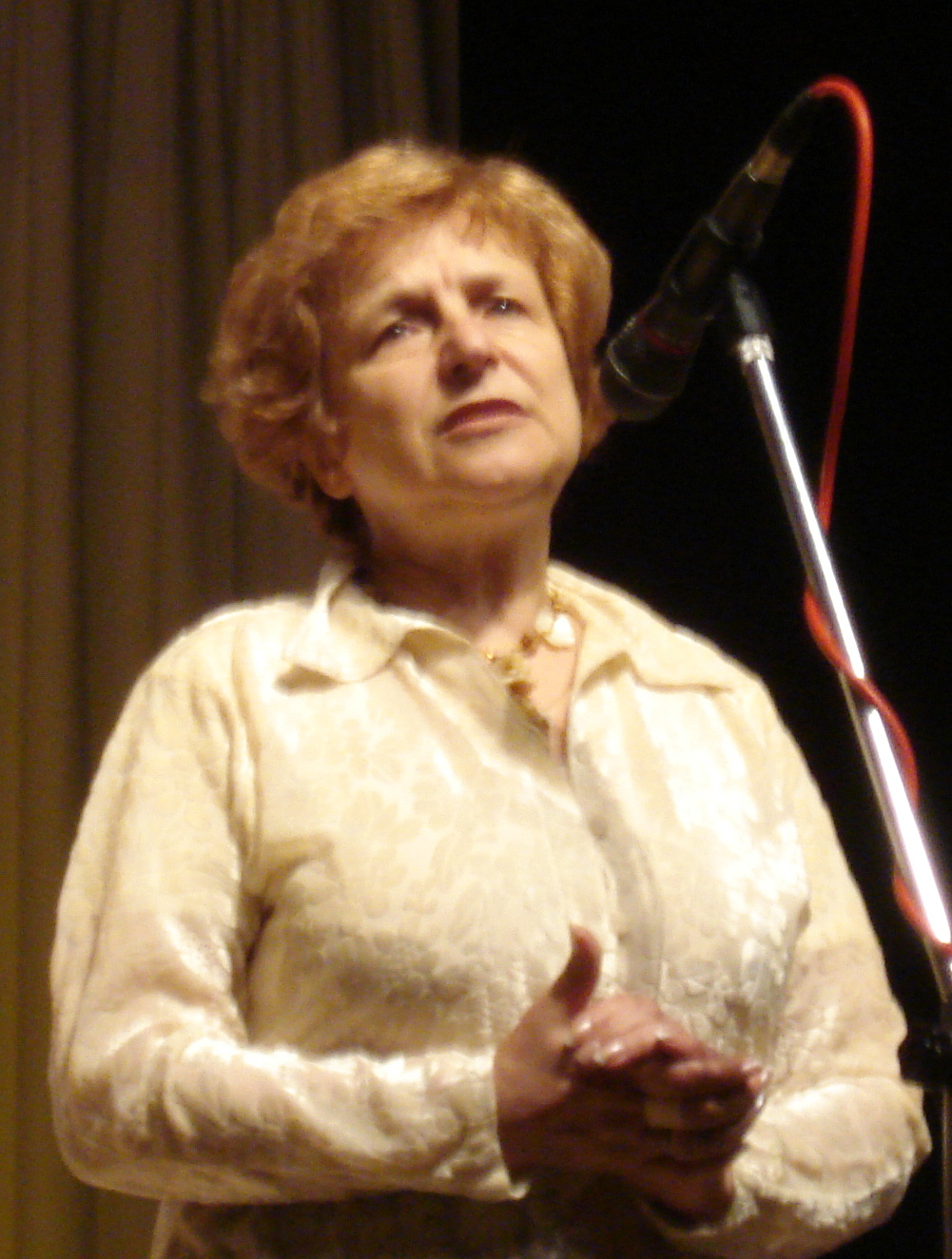
Tatjana Ždanoka (LKS)
