= 2009 European Parliament election in Latvia =

- 6 June 2009

8 seats to the European Parliament

An election of the delegation from Latvia to the European Parliament was held on 6 June 2009. Seventeen lists containing a total of 185 candidates were registered for the election.

The election was conducted according to the party-list proportional representation system, with at least 5% of votes necessary to gain seats in the parliament. Voters were given 17 ballot papers, one for each party and had the opportunity to approve of candidates on their chosen list by adding a plus or disapprove by crossing out candidates.

== Results ==
Party	Votes	%	Seats			
Party	Votes	%	Original	+/–	Post-Lisbon	+/–
Civic Union	192,537	24.78	2	New	3	+1
Harmony Centre	154,894	19.93	2	+2	2	0
For Human Rights in United Latvia	76,436	9.84	1	0	1	0
Latvia's First Party/Latvian Way	59,326	7.63	1	0	1	0
For Fatherland and Freedom/LNNK	58,991	7.59	1	–3	1	0
New Era Party	52,751	6.79	1	–1	1	0
Libertas.lv	34,073	4.38	0	New	0	0
Society for Political Change	30,444	3.92	0	New	0	0
Latvian Social Democratic Workers' Party	30,004	3.86	0	0	0	0
Union of Greens and Farmers	29,463	3.79	0	0	0	0
All for Latvia!	22,240	2.86	0	0	0	0
People's Party	21,968	2.83	0	–1	0	0
Motherland	4,409	0.57	0	New	0	0
Action Party	3,373	0.43	0	New	0	0
Christian Democratic Union	2,361	0.30	0	0	0	0
Osipova Party	2,102	0.27	0	New	0	0
Latvian Rebirth Party	1,712	0.22	0	New	0	0
Total	777,084	100.00	8	–1	9	+1
Valid votes	777,084	98.17				
Invalid/blank votes	14,513	1.83				
Total votes	791,597	100.00				
Registered voters/turnout	1,484,781	53.31				
Source: CVK, European Elections Database

=== Elected MEPs ===
Elected MEPs
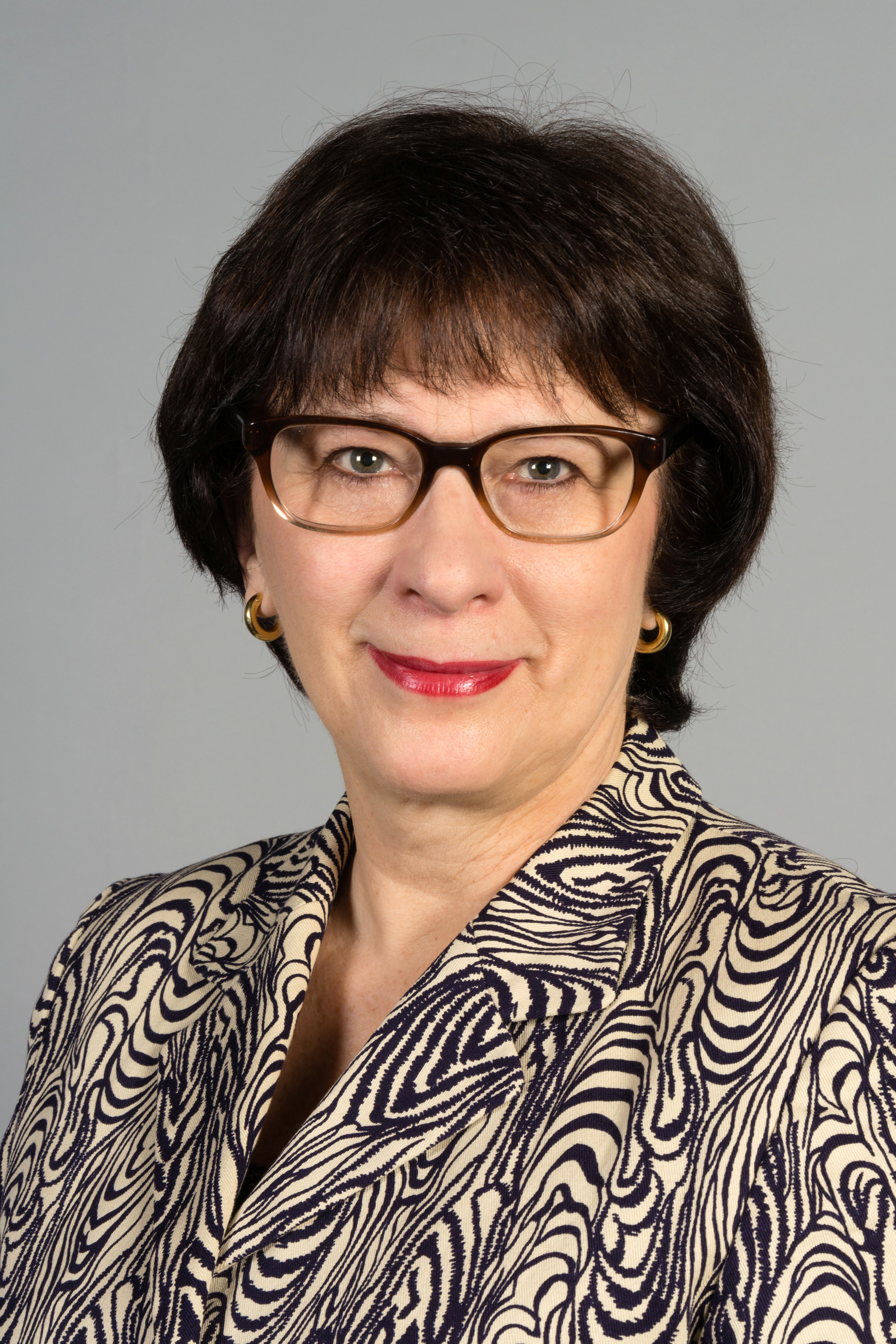
Sandra Kalniete (PS)

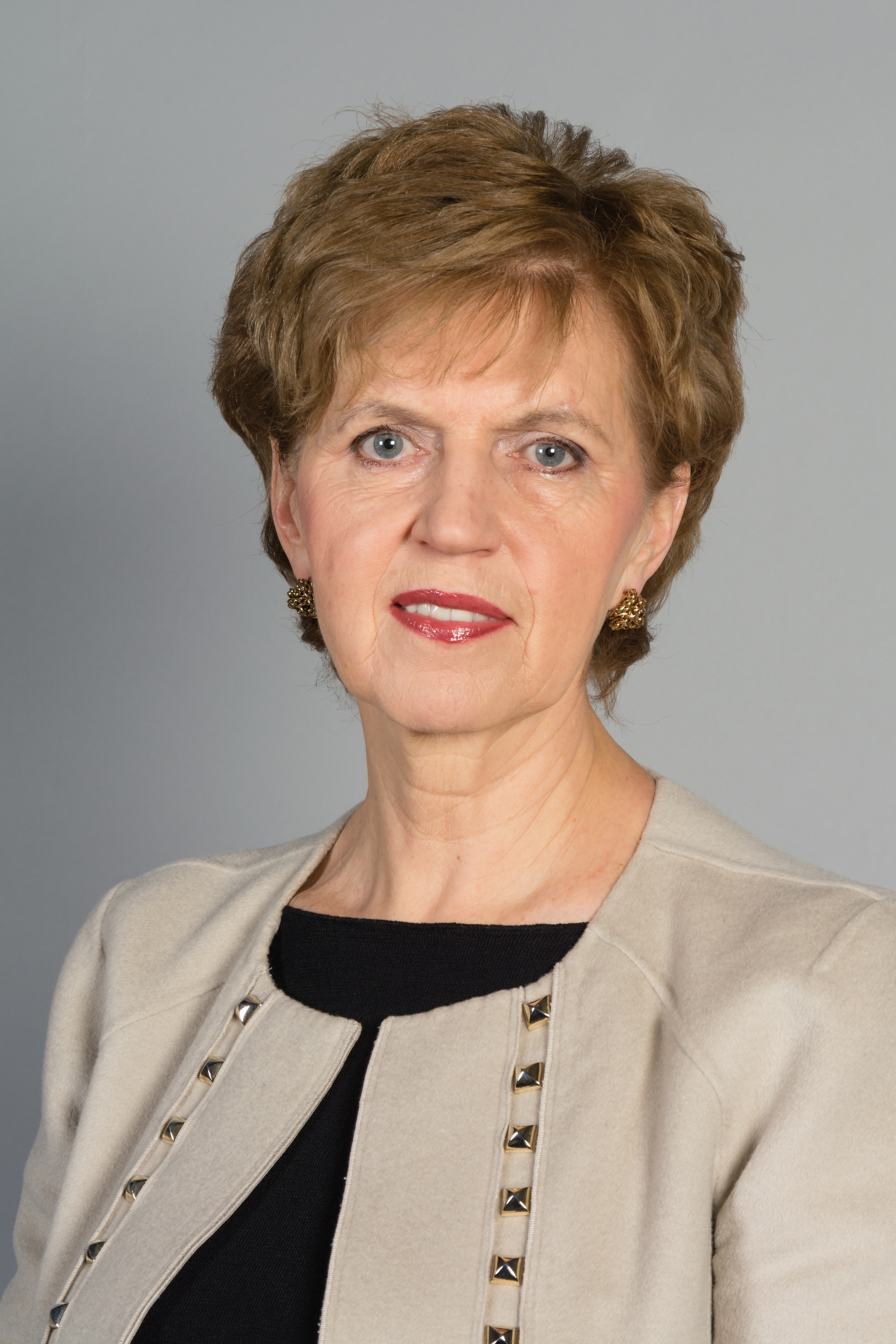
Inese Vaidere (PS)

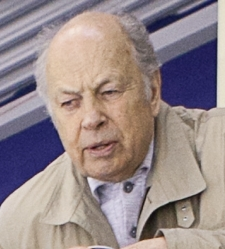
Alfrēds Rubiks (SC)

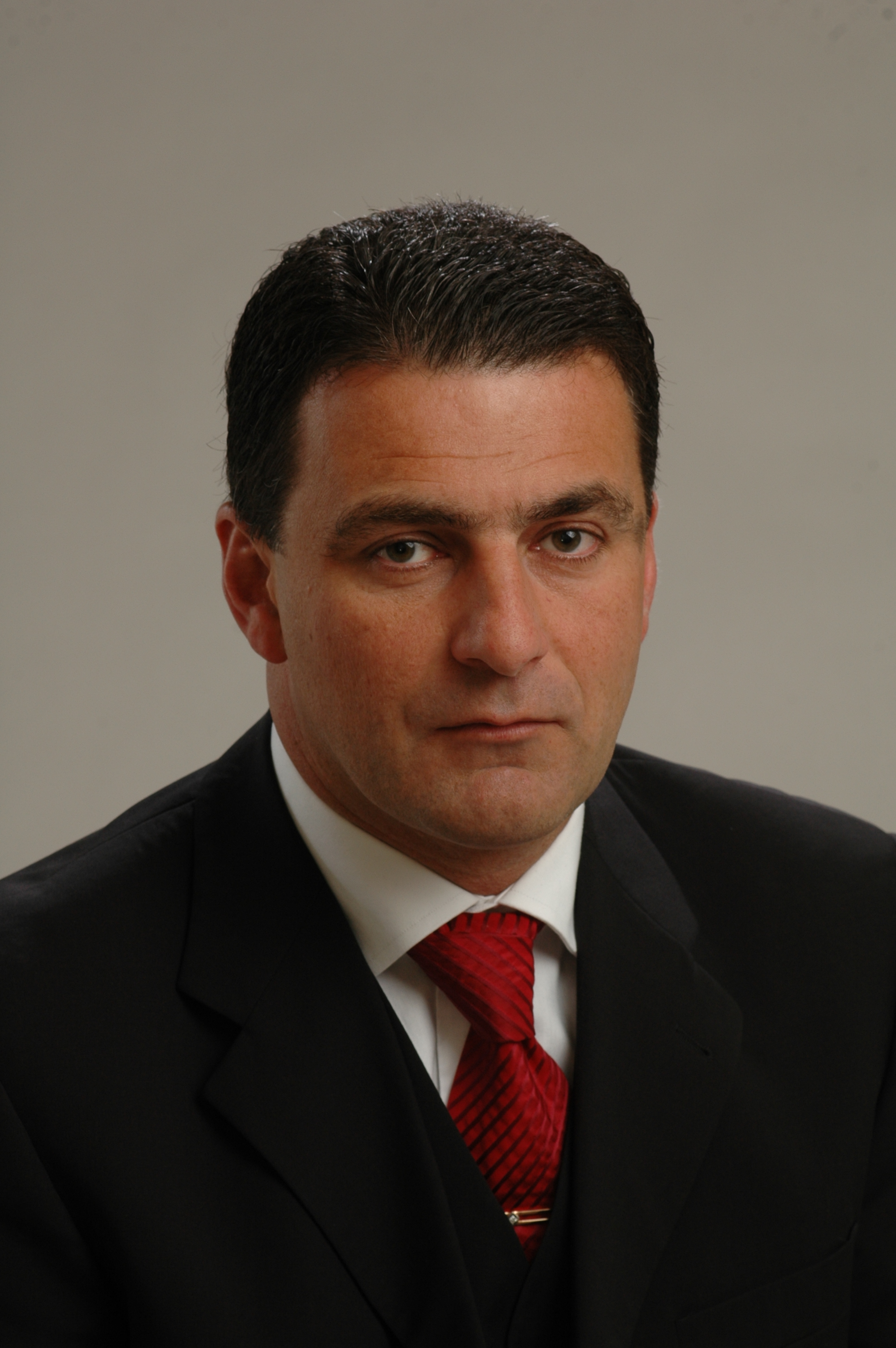
Aleksandrs Mirskis (SC)

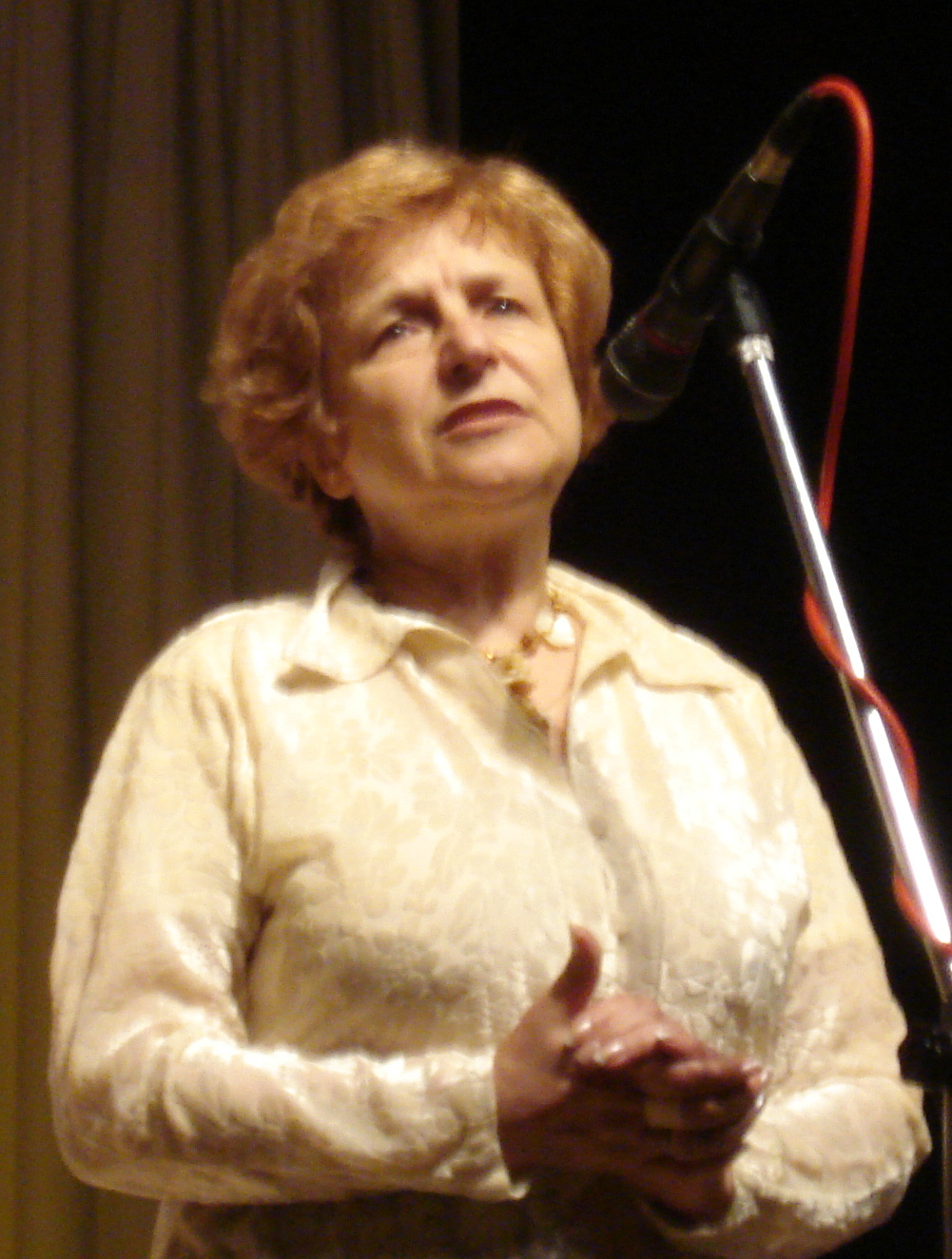
Tatjana Ždanoka (PCTVL)

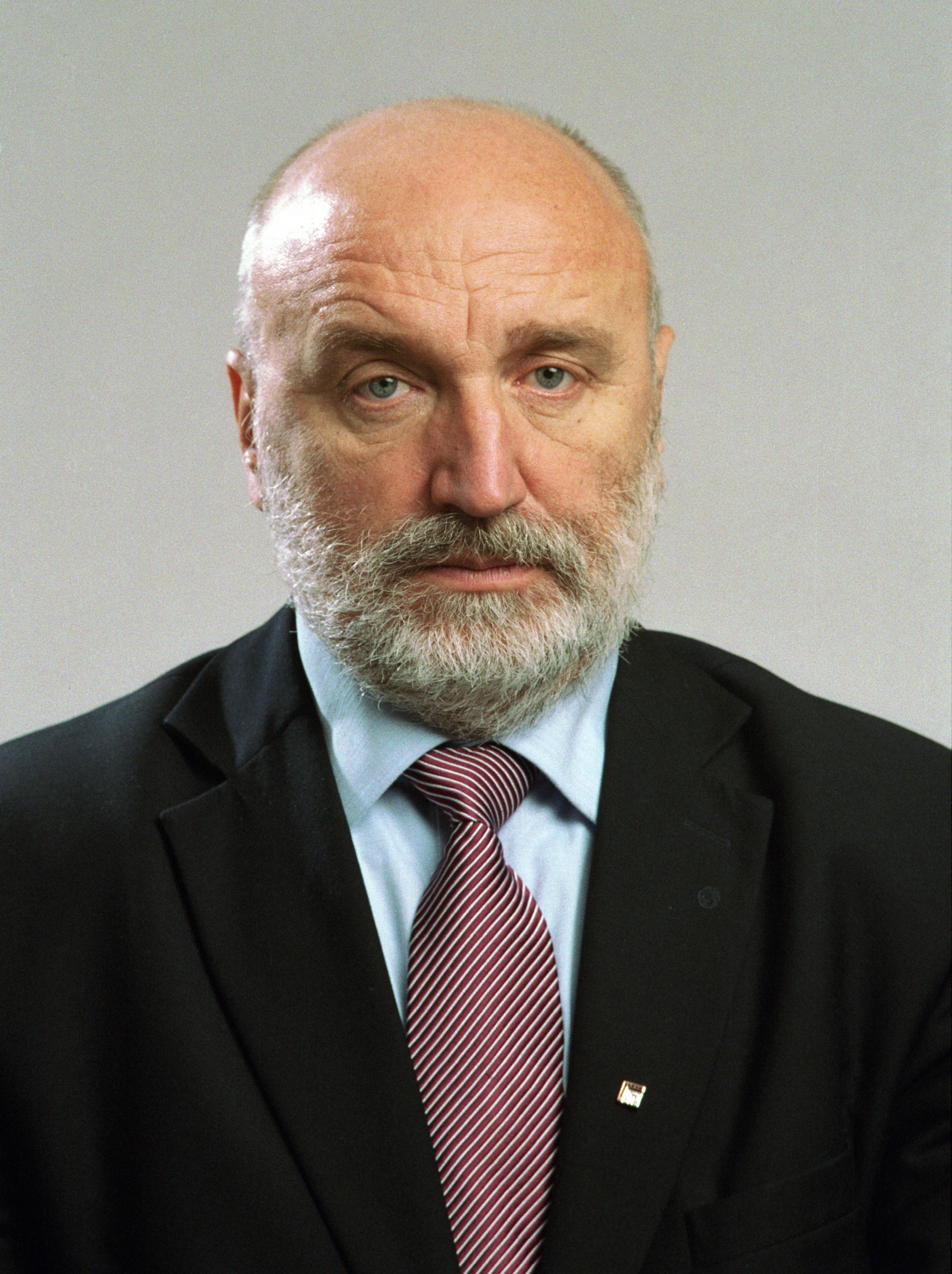
Ivars Godmanis (LPP/LC)

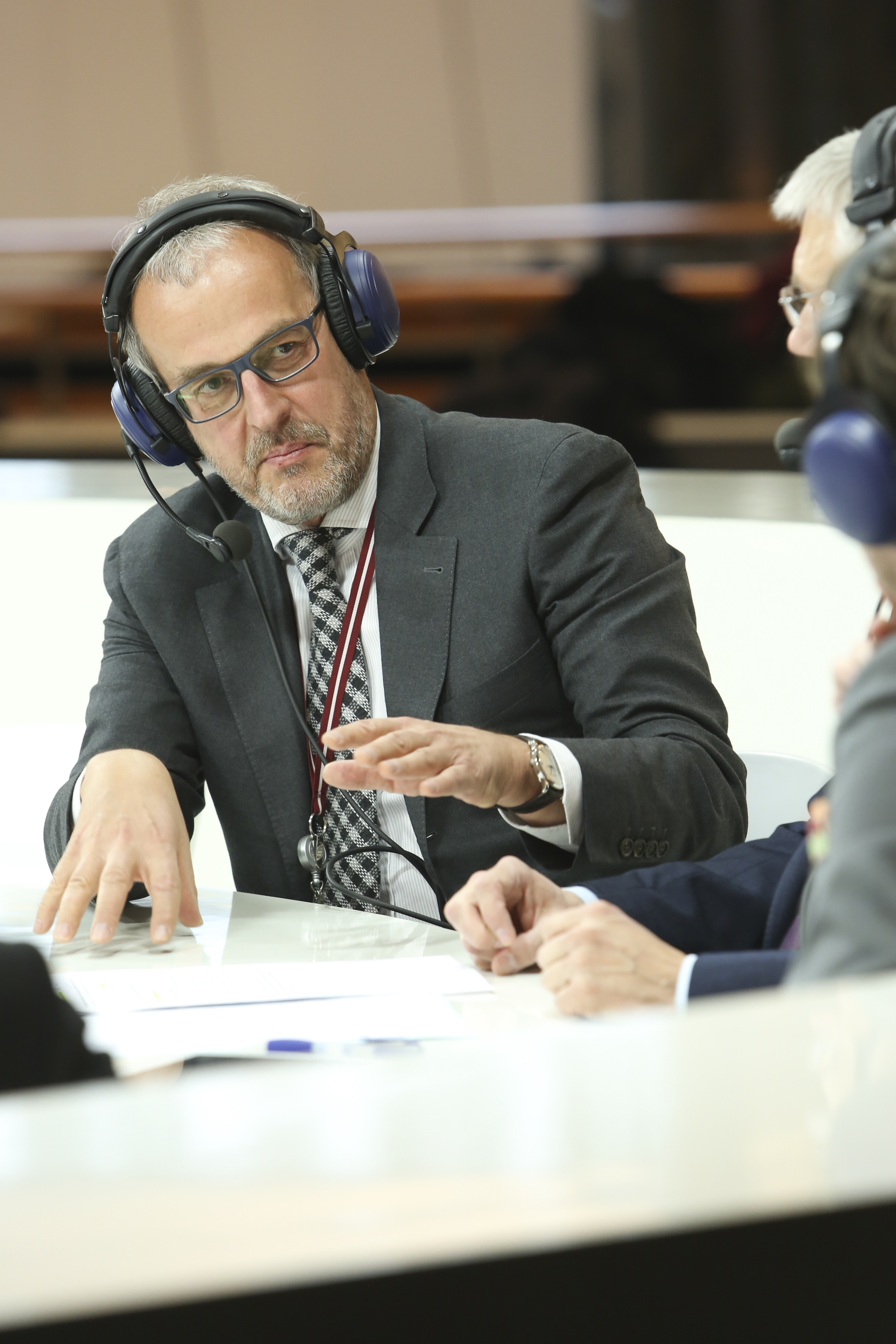
Roberts Zīle (TB/LNNK)

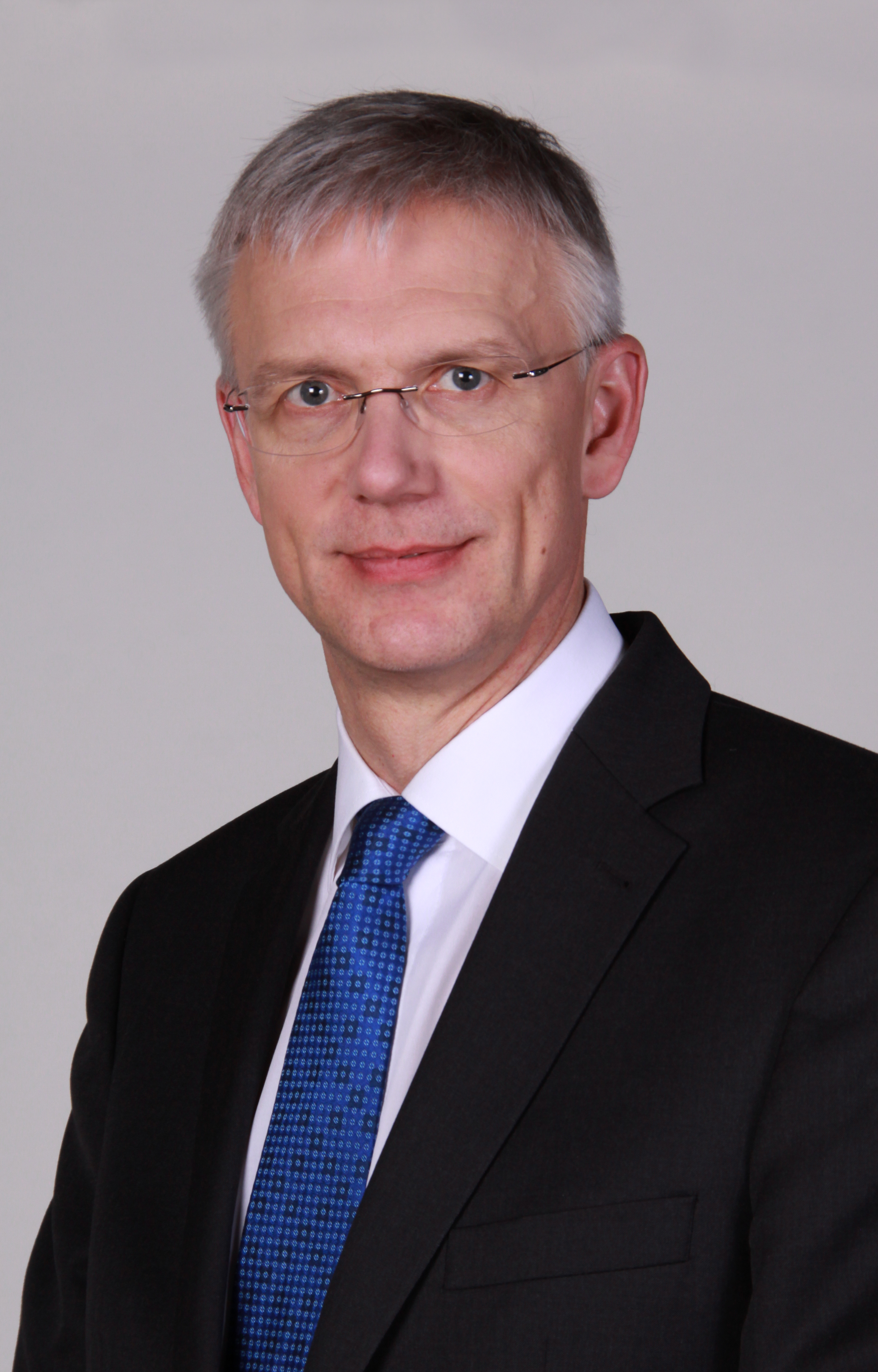
Arturs Krišjānis Kariņš (JL)
