= Inese Vaidere =

Latvian politician

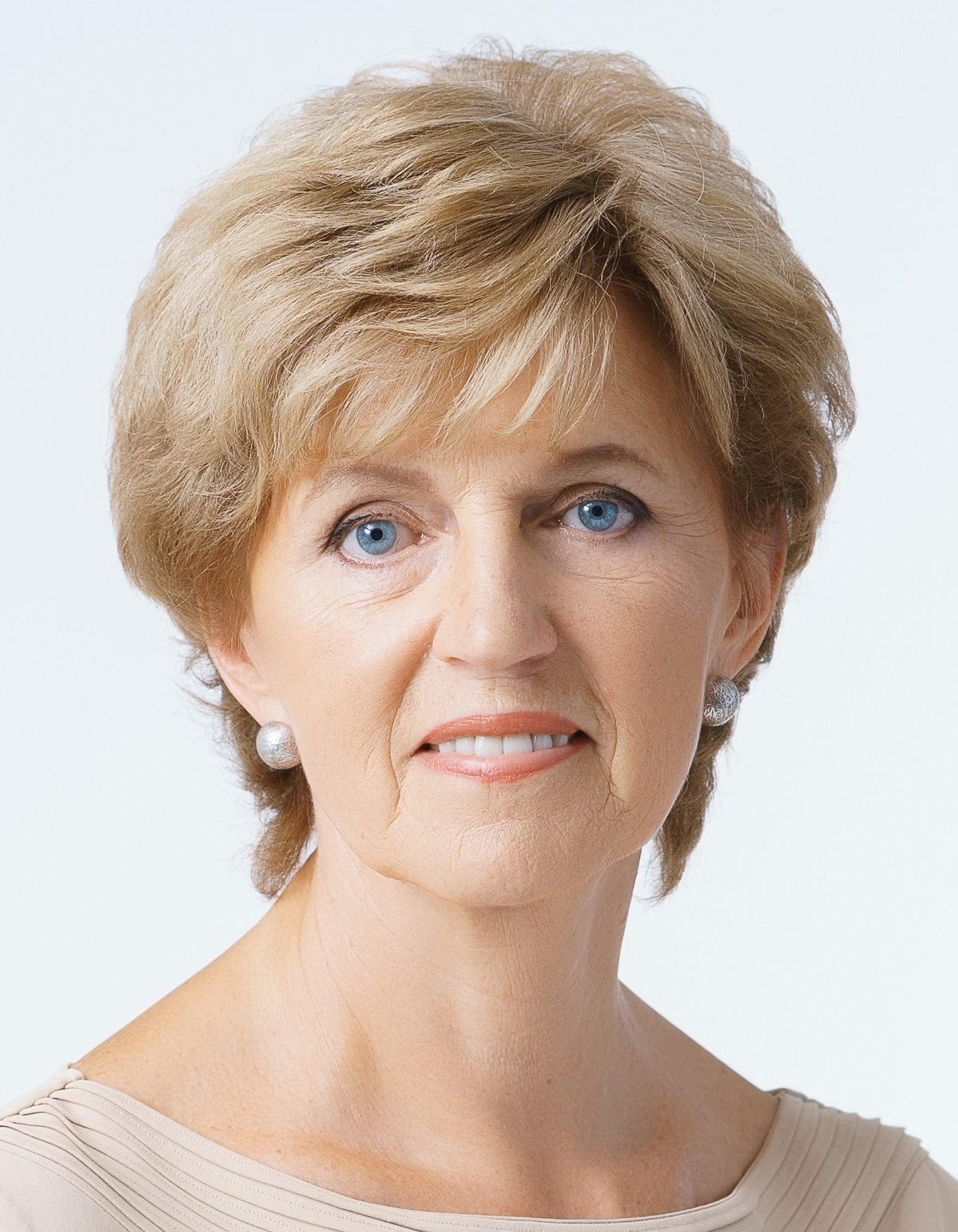

Member of the European Parliament for Latvia
- In office 20 July 2004 – 30 June 2014
- In office 1 November 2014 – present

Personal details
- Born: 3 September 1952 (age 74) Jelgava, Latvian SSR
- Party: For Fatherland and Freedom/LNNK (1998–2008); Civic Union (2008–2012); Unity (2012–present)
- Education: University of Latvia
- Occupation: Economist
- Website: www.vaidere.lv

Inese Vaidere (born 3 September 1952) is a Latvian politician who currently serves as a Member of the European Parliament (MEP).

== Political career ==
=== Early years in politics ===
In 1977, Inese Vaidere joined the Communist Party of the Soviet Union, which she left in 1988.

=== Role in national politics ===
Vaidere was Minister of State for the Environment in the Krištopans cabinet from 1998 to 1999, Vice-Mayor of Riga from 2001 to 2002 and a member of the Saeima from 2002 to 2004.

=== Member of the European Parliament, 2004–present ===
Vaidere was elected to the European Parliament in 2004 from the For Fatherland and Freedom/LNNK list and sat with the Union for a Europe of Nations group. In 2009 she was elected from the Civic Union list and sat with the European People's Party group.

Between 2004 and 2014, Vaidere was a member of the Committee on Foreign Affairs and the Subcommittee on Human Rights. In 2013, she drafted the parliament's report on the impact of the financial and economic crisis on human rights, which calls for the EU to help developing countries create social-protection schemes.

In 2014, Vaidere was placed 6th on the Unity list and was preferenced 5th by voters. Unity won 4 of Latvia's European Parliament seats and she was not elected. However the first candidate elected on the list, Valdis Dombrovskis, became the European Commissioner for the Euro and Social Dialogue on 1 November 2014 and ceased to be an MEP. Vaidere, as next in line on the Unity list, replaced him in the Parliament.

From 2014 until 2019, Vaidere was a member of the Committee on Budgets. Since 2019, she has been serving on the Committee on Economic and Monetary Affairs. In addition to her committee assignments, she is a member of the European Parliament Intergroup on Integrity (Transparency, Anti-Corruption and Organized Crime), the European Parliament Intergroup on Traditional Minorities, National Communities and Languages, the European Parliament Intergroup on Small and Medium-Sized Enterprises (SMEs), the European Parliament Intergroup on the Digital Agenda and the European Internet Forum.

== Political positions ==
Vaidere is a signatory of the Prague Declaration on European Conscience and Communism.

In 2015, news media reported that Vaidere was included in a Russian blacklist of prominent people from the European Union who are not allowed to enter the country.
