= Lolita Čigāne =

Latvian politician

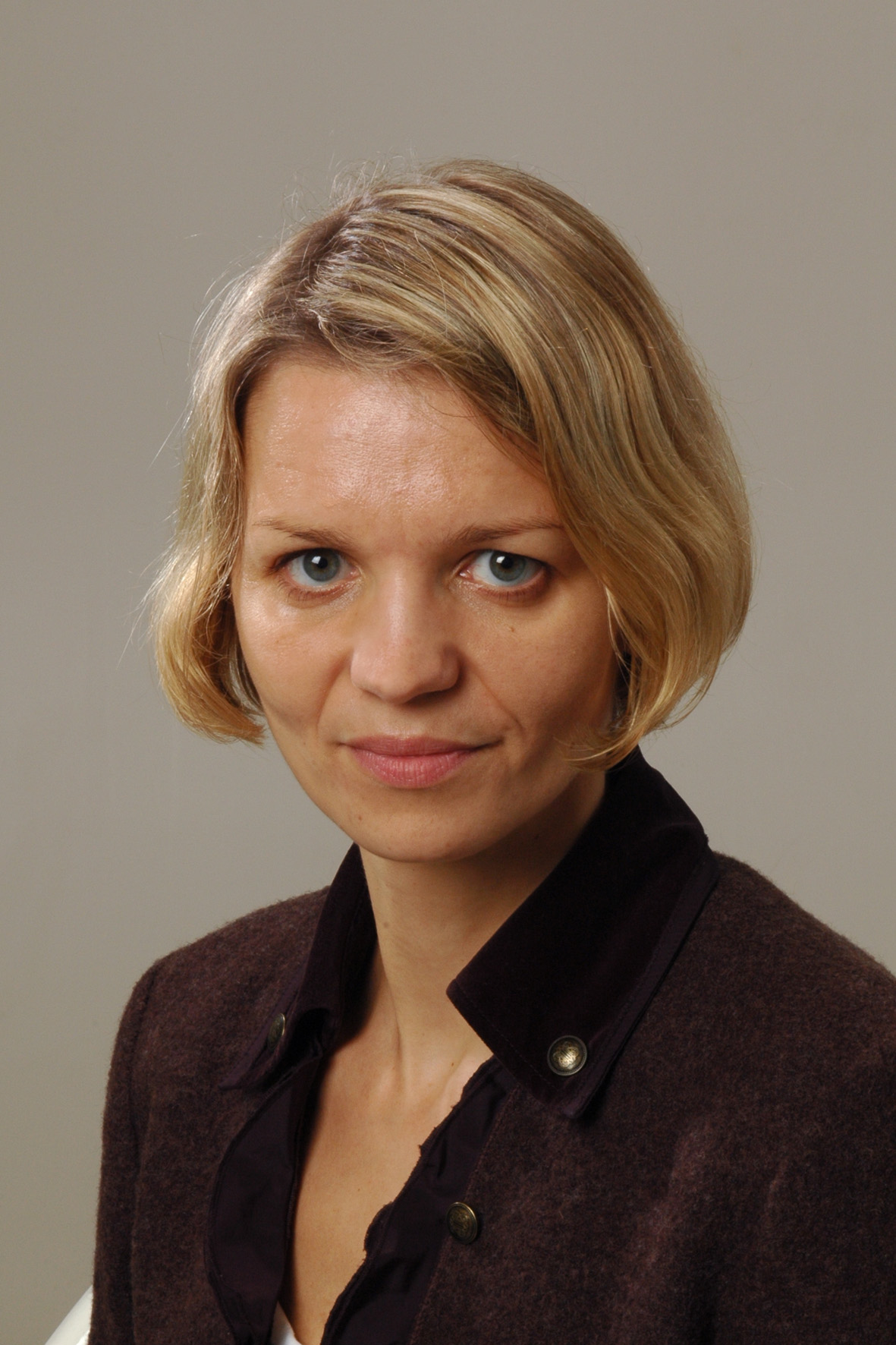

Personal details
- Born: 18 August 1973 (age 53) Ozolnieki, Latvian SSR
- Other political affiliations: Movement For! (2017–2018); Unity (2011–2017); Civic Union (2010–2011)
- Spouse: Nils Students
- Education: Latvian Academy of Culture; Central European University; London School of Economics

Lolita Čigāne (born 18 August 1973) is an international consultant and policy analyst in elections, good governance, parliamentarianism and anti-corruption, previously a journalist, anti-corruption activist and advocate and a member of parliament. She was first elected to the 10th Saeima (parliament) in 2010. She served a full term as a Member of Parliament in the 11th Saeima (2011–2014), was the parliamentary secretary of the Ministry of Finance in 2013-2014 and a member of 12th Saeima, serving also as the chair of the European Affairs Committee until November 2018. She was the chairperson of the Board of Transparency International Latvia in 2008-2010. Currently she works with organizations such as OSCE, European Commission, NDI, UNDP and others, as well as a visiting lecturer at Stockholm School of Economics in Riga teaching political economy courses. In 2020 - 2023, she worked with OSCE in the leadership of election missions to Croatia, Mongolia, Germany, France, Italy and others. Lolita Cigane is also the author of the book "A woman in power. What politics taught me about the life and myself. Political notes in drawings" published in 2023, (currently available in Latvian) that reflects on her experiences from the time in politics.

== Early life and education ==
Čigāne first studied at Ozolnieku Primary school and Jelgava Secondary School No. 2 from 1980 to 1990. She graduated from the Latvian Academy of Culture in 1996 with a BA in International cultural relations, specializing in Swedish language and culture. During her studies she was an exchange student at the University of Vasteras in Sweden. In 2000, Čigāne received a Master of Arts degree from the Central European University (CEU) in Budapest, Hungary in International Relations and European Studies. In 2001, she received a Master of Science degree from London School of Economics (LSE) London, UK with a specialization in International Political Economy.

== Professional career ==
Čigāne worked as a Swedish translator, interpreter and office manager with several Swedish companies and organizations from 1993 to 1997. From 1997 to 1999, she worked at Radio Free Europe/Radio Liberty as a correspondent and international news analyst in Riga, Latvia and Prague, Czech Republic. From 2001 to 2003, Čigāne worked as the Project Director for election campaign monitoring projects at Soros Foundation Latvia and Transparency International Latvia branch Delna.

From 2004 to 2007, Čigāne worked at the Centre for Public Policy Providus where she managed public policy projects dealing with financing of political parties, conduct of election campaigns and monitoring of the EU structural fund distribution. From 2007 to 2010, she worked as an international consultant with several international organizations. From 2008 to 2010, she was the chairperson of the Board of Transparency International Latvia Chapter Delna.

== Political career ==
Čigāne became a member of the organization Meierovics's society for progressive changes that was established in March 2010 by the former editor-in-chief of the biggest daily Diena Sarmīte Ēlerte in March 2010. In May 2010, members of the organization announced that they would be running in October 2010 parliamentary elections on the list of Unity electoral bloc from the political party Civic Union. Running from the 8th position in Riga constituency, Lolita Čigāne was elected to the 10th Saeima in October 2010. In 2011, the parliament was dissolved by then President Valdis Zatlers, quoting increasing influence of oligarchs in parliamentary decision making.

In early elections of September 2011, Čigāne was seventh on the Unity party list with six members qualifying for election to parliament. She nevertheless served as a Member of Parliament for a full term after the Minister of Finance Andris Vilks took office in November 2011 and suspended his parliamentary mandate. She became the Parliamentary Secretary of the Ministry of Finance in the autumn of 2013.

Čigāne was elected to the 12th Saeima (parliament) on 4 October 2014 and in November 2014 became the chairperson of the European Affairs Committee of Saeima.

Čigāne along with four other MPs (Ilze Viņķele, Ints Dālderis, Andrejs Judins and Aleksejs Loskutovs) left the Unity party in July 2017, and became a founding member of the Movement For! party. She left the Movement For! party in April 2018.

== Other activities ==
- European Council on Foreign Relations (ECFR), Member
- Vice-president, European Movement - Latvia
- Vice-chair of the Board, the Isaiah Berlin Association in Latvia
- Member of the Board, Civic Alliance - Latvia
- Member of the Board, Meierovic's Society for Progressive Changes
