= Ilze Viņķele =

Latvian politician

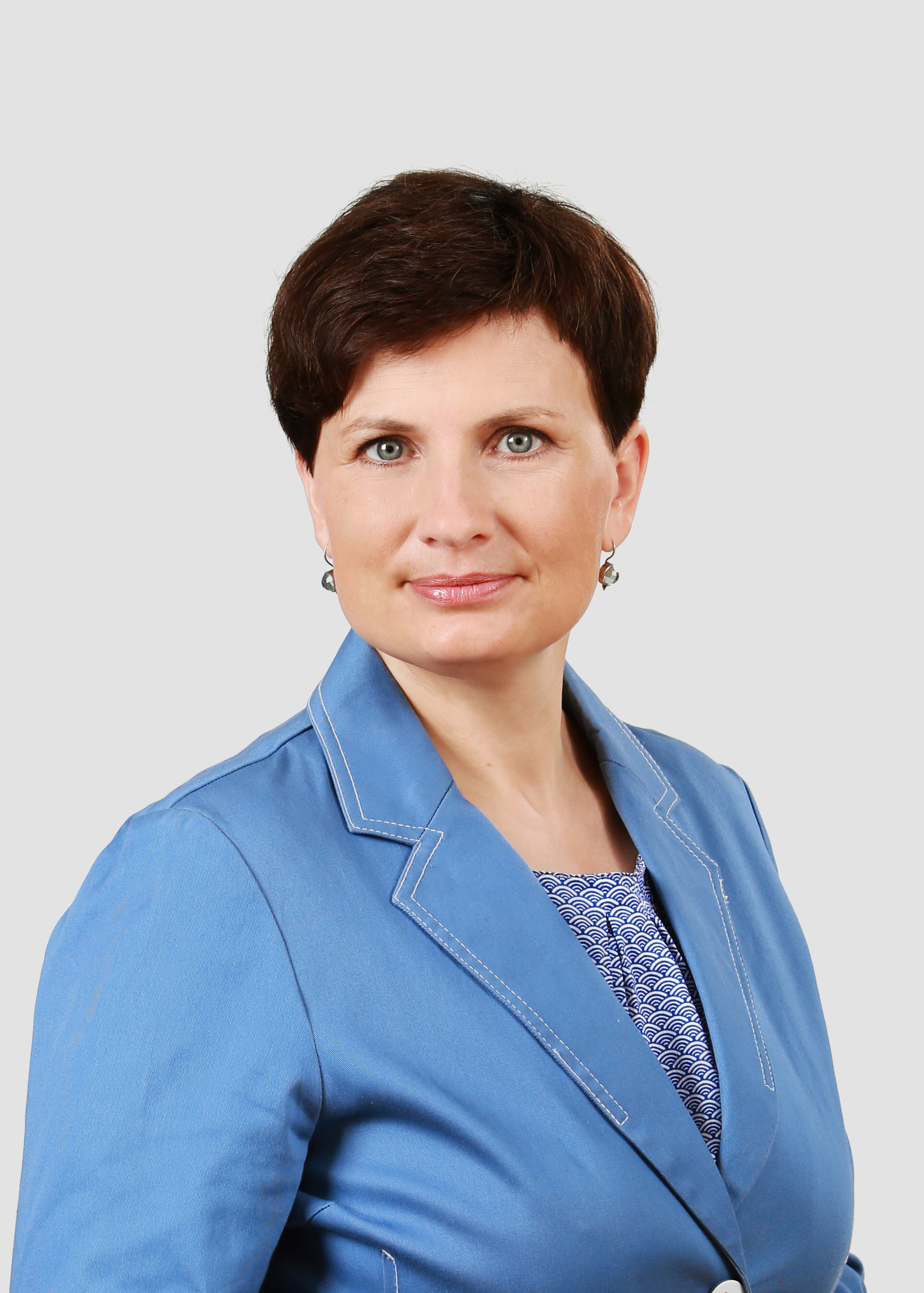

Minister for Health of Latvia
- In office 23 January 2019 – 7 January 2021
- Prime Minister: Arturs Krišjānis Kariņš
- Preceded by: Anda Čakša
- Succeeded by: Daniels Pavļuts

Minister for Welfare of Latvia
- In office 25 October 2011 – 22 January 2014
- Prime Minister: Valdis Dombrovskis
- Preceded by: Ilona Jurševska
- Succeeded by: Uldis Augulis

Personal details
- Born: 27 November 1971 (age 54) Rēzekne, Latvian SSR
- Party: Movement For!
- Other political affiliations: Unity (2011–2017); Civic Union (2008–2011); TB/LNNK (Until 2008)
- Spouse: Juris Viņķelis
- Children: 3
- Education: Riga Stradiņš University
- Profession: Journalist, social worker

Ilze Viņķele (born Ilze Vidiņa on 27 November 1971 in Rēzekne) is a Latvian politician, and the former Minister for Welfare and Minister for Health of Latvia. Currently, she is a member of the political party Movement For!, formerly a part of the Development/For! alliance.

== Political activity ==
On 7 November 2006 Ilze Viņķele became the Secretary of Parliament of the Special Assignments Ministry for European Union Funds of Latvia. In 2010 she was elected as a member of the 10th Saeima, however, she became the Secretary of Parliament of the Ministry for Finance of Latvia. Viņķele was appointed Minister for Welfare of Latvia on 25 October 2011. In September 2012, 54 non-governmental organizations sent a joint letter demanding the resignation of Viņķele over two kindergarten booklets "The Day when Ruth was Richard" and "The Day when Karl was Caroline" whose publishing and distribution the ministry supported.

On 17 July 2017 Viņķele and 4 other MPs (Ints Dālderis, Lolita Čigāne, Andrejs Judins and Aleksejs Loskutovs) left Unity, however she continued to work in the party's parliamentary faction. On 26 August 2017 Viņķele became one of the founders for the political party Movement For! and was elected as its board member. On 29 August 2017 Viņķele stepped down as a member of Saeima, being selected to study at the McCain Institute at the University of Arizona as one of the eight beneficiaries.

On 5 January 2021 Prime Minister Krišjānis Kariņš announced that he would be demanding the resignation of Viņķele as Health Minister due to disagreements over her proposed plan for the distribution of the COVID-19 vaccine in Latvia. On the same day, she accepted the demand, and stepped down on 7 January 2021, with party member Daniels Pavļuts being confirmed to succeed her the same day.
