= Pavļuts =

Pavļuts, feminine: Pavļuta is a Latvian surname. notable peole with the surname include:

- Daniels Pavļuts (born 14 May 1976) is a Latvian politician and civil servant
- Sanita Pavļuta-Deslandes (born 1972) is a Latvian civil servant and diplomat
