= Movement For! =

Liberal political party in Latvia

Movement For! Kustība Par!
- Abbreviation: Par!
- Chairperson: Linda Curika
- Founded: 27 August 2017; 9 years ago
- Headquarters: Torņa iela 4, III-C 101, Riga LV-1050
- Membership (2026): 500
- Ideology: Liberalism; Social liberalism
- Political position: Centre to centre-left
- European affiliation: Alliance of Liberals and Democrats for Europe
- European Parliament group: Renew Europe
- Colours: Yellow; Black
- Saeima: 0 / 100 (0%)
- European Parliament: 0 / 9 (0%)
- Riga City Council: 2 / 60
- Mayors: 1 / 43

Website
- kustibapar.lv

Movement For! (Latvian: Kustība Par!) is a liberal political party in Latvia. It is positioned in the centre on the political spectrum with an emphasis on social liberalism. The party was formed in August 2017. From 2018 to 2022 it was one of the members of the Development/For! alliance, before it de facto dissolved.

== History ==
Movement For! did not participate in Latvian parliamentary election in 2014, but received representation in the Saeima when Lolita Čigāne, Ints Dālderis, Andrejs Judins and Aleksejs Loskutovs defected from Unity in July 2017, with Čigāne suggesting the Latvian political spectrum needed a centrist, pro-European party. In February 2018, Saeima members Judins and Loskutovs left the "Movement For". Dālderis and Čigāne retired from the party in April 2018, depriving it of its remaining members of parliament.

In June 2018, member of European Parliament Artis Pabriks (former foreign minister and minister of defense of Latvia) defected from Unity to the Movement For, thereby representing the new party in the European Parliament. He continues to sit with the centre-right European People's Party group. Pabriks has also announced to run for the 2018 parliamentary election on the joint list of Latvian Development and Movement For. He was the prime ministerial candidate of Development/For! in the 2018 parliamentary election.

=== Latvian parliamentary election, 2018 ===
In March 2018, Movement For! formed the Development/For! electoral alliance with two small liberal and pro-European parties, Latvian Development (Latvijas attīstībai) and Growth (Izaugsme), to run in the Latvian parliamentary election in October of the same year together. The alliance was fully registered on 20 April 2018. The alliance came in 4th in the election and joined the Kariņš cabinet.

The party was accepted as a full member of the Alliance of Liberals and Democrats for Europe in October 2019.

=== 2021 Latvian municipal elections ===
In November 2020 "Movement For!" announced that in the 2021 Latvian municipal elections, will start with own lists, its identity and program, but there is possibility that in some of the municipalities "Movement For!" will start with a joint list with the parties Latvian Development and Growth.

At the time "Movement For!" reported to have 12 territorial chapters - Ādaži, Cēsis, Jelgava, Jūrmala, Kuldīga, Liepāja, Mārupe, Ogre, Tukums, Rīga, Valmiera and the United Kingdom. Formerly party had a chapter in Ropaži too.

=== 2022 parliamentary elections, aftermath ===
After disappointing results from the 2022 parliamentary election, in which the alliance lost all of its seats, the alliance was technically dissolved, though it remains registered to maintain state funding under the legal name of PLI (an abbreviation of the initials of the names of the former constituent parties).

For the 2024 European parliament elections – the first where the party would run independently from alliances – the party list was headed by Ukrainian-Belgian political activist and Renew Europe organizer Ivanna Volochiy. The list came in last place, receiving 0.32% of the vote.

In the 2025 Latvian municipal elections, the party fielded candidates in its list or within joint lists with other parties in the state cities of Riga, Jelgava, Ventspils and Liepāja, as well as in Rēzekne Municipality, Ogre Municipality and Cēsis Municipality. In all of the cases except Liepāja, party candidates were elected to the municipal councils. Movement For! member and attorney Mārtiņš Daģis was subsequently elected as the Mayor of Jelgava, leading a multi-party coalition.

=== 2026 parliamentary elections ===
In the lead-up to the elections for the 15th Saeima, Movement For! began talks for creating a coalition of various pro-European parties for the parliamentary election. In June 2026, it was announced that Movement For!, along with the regional parties We - For Talsi and Municipality and Together for Liepāja (Latvian: Kopā Liepājai) will field candidates in the electoral list of The Progressives.

== Ideology and policies ==
The party has been described as espousing social liberal and some economic liberal views.

=== Party manifesto ===
The party's manifesto emphasizes the need for a unity of society, accessible public health care for everyone, rule of law standing over power and fair trial standing over corruption. The manifesto also calls for a reorganization of the powers to counties and cities, state aid for globally sustainable businesses, and addressing the issue of non-citizens in Latvia. Regarding public safety and foreign policy Movement For! seeks for a close cooperation between Latvia and European Union as well as NATO.

== Organisation ==
=== Leadership ===
The party's leader from its founding to 2022 was Daniels Pavļuts, who was simultaneously Minister of Health and former Minister of Economics in the Third Dombrovskis cabinet.

From 2017 to 2019 the party was led by a board of eight members: former politician Ilze Viņķele, MP of the Saeima Ints Dālderis, political analyst Marija Golubeva, corporate lawyer Evita Goša, economist Kaspars Briškens, Ventspils State Gymnasium No.1 deputy director Oskars Kaulēns, entrepreneur Mārtiņš Staķis and Ministry of Transport official Andulis Židkovs.

In June 2019 a new, larger board with 11 members was elected: Ilze Viņķele, MP of the Saeima and leader of the Development/For! fraction Marija Golubeva, Chairman of the Riga City Council Mārtiņš Staķis, MP of the Saeima Vita Anda Tērauda, Parliamentary Secretary of the Ministry of Environmental Protection and Regional Development Dace Bluķe, MP of the Saeima Mārtiņš Šteins, Head of the Office of the Ministry of Health Vladislava Šķēle, entrepreneur Normunds Mihailovs, DevOp Edgars Jēkabsons and entrepreneur Jevgenijs Lurje.

After the disappointing performance of Development/For! in the 2022 parliamentary election, the board of the party announced its resignation, remaining as technical members until an emergency party congress. During an emergency congress on 3 December 2022, the members of the party voted to expand the number of chairpersons to three, electing former MPs Laima Geikina and Inese Voika, as well as Vladislava Marāne (ex Šķēle), the former Chief of the Office of the Minister of Health. A new board was also elected. Marāne later left her post.

On 14 September 2024, the leadership of the party changed, with activist, stand-up comedian and communications manager Linda Curika being elected as its sole chairperson. A new, smaller board of the party was elected, consisting of three members: Curika, Miks Celmiņš and Mārtiņš Šteins.

=== Membership ===
The party reported having 500 members in March 2026.

== Election results ==
=== Legislative elections ===
| Election | Party leader | Performance | | | | | Rank | Government |
| Election | Party leader | Votes | % | ± pp | Seats | +/– | Rank | Government |
|---|---|---|---|---|---|---|---|---|
| 2018 (Note: Run as part of the Development/For! coalition (Par!, LA and Izaugsme)) | Daniels Pavļuts | 101,685 | 12.12 | New | 6 / 100 | New | 4th | Coalition |
| 2022 | Daniels Pavļuts | 45,452 | 4.97 | ▼7.15 | 0 / 100 | ▼0 | 8th | Extra-parliamentary |

=== European Parliament elections ===
| Election | List leader | Votes | % | Seats | +/– | EP Group |
|---|---|---|---|---|---|---|
| 2019 (Note: The Development/For! list won 1 seats - 1 went to LA) | Ivars Ijabs | 58,763 | 12.49 (#4) | 0 / 8 | New | – |
| 2024 | Ivanna Volochiy | 1,666 | 0.32 (#16) | 0 / 9 | 0 | – |
