= Ilona Jurševska =

Latvian politician

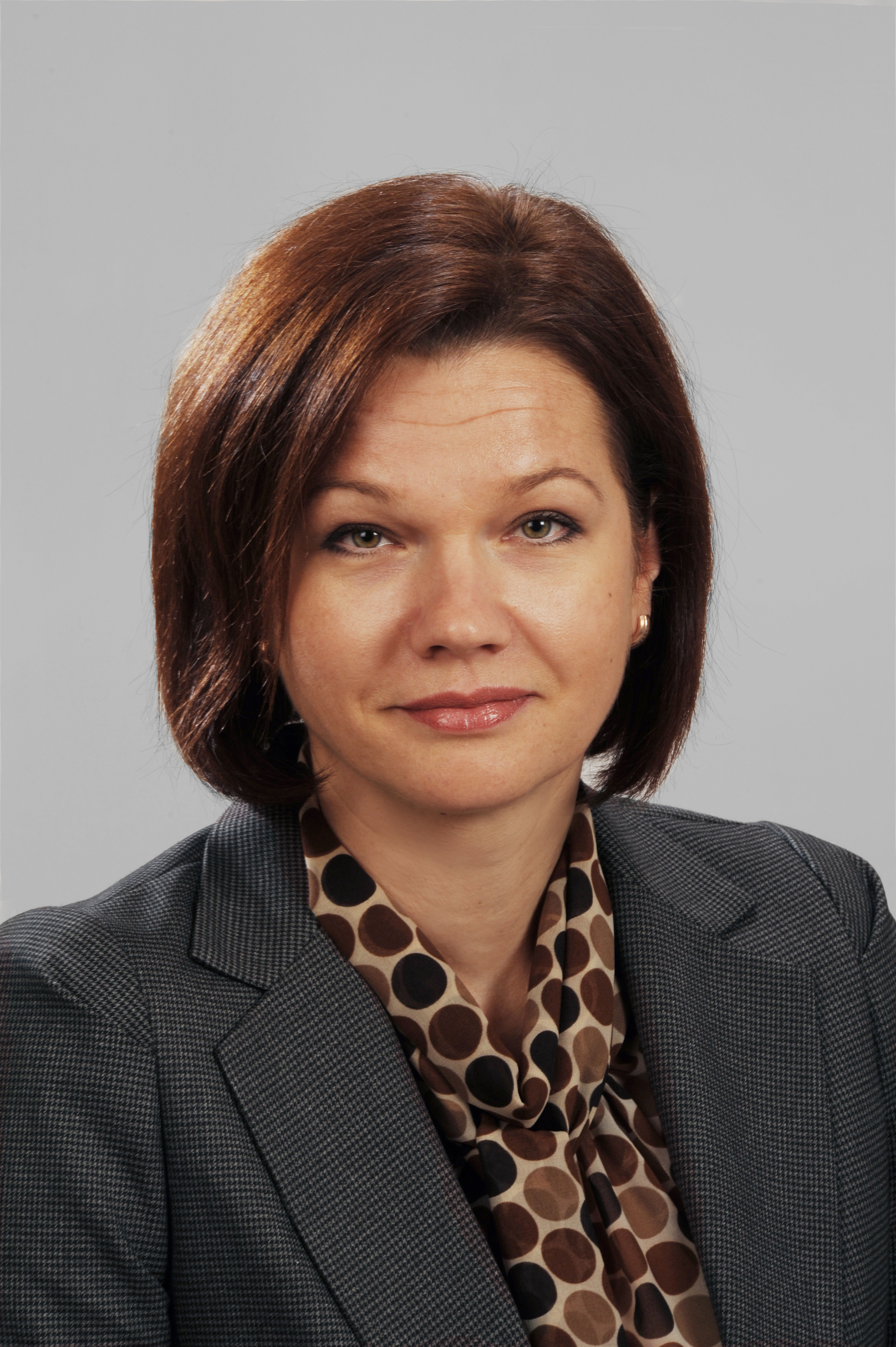

Minister of Welfare in Latvia
- In office November 3, 2010 – October 3, 2011
- President: Valdis Zatlers; Andris Bērziņš
- Prime Minister: Valdis Dombrovskis
- Preceded by: Uldis Augulis
- Succeeded by: Ilze Viņķele

Personal details
- Born: August 20, 1970 (age 56) Līvāni, Latvian SSR, Soviet Union
- Other political affiliations: Latvian Farmers' Union
- Education: Liepāja Pedagogical Institute; Turība School of Business Administration
- Profession: Primary School Teacher, Public Relations Specialist

Ilona Jurševska (born 20 August 1970) is a Latvian politician, member of the Latvian Farmers' Union. She was the Minister of Welfare of Latvia in the Second Dombrovskis cabinet from 3 November 2010 to 25 October 2011. Since 2014, she is the Director of institution at the Social Integration State Agency.
