= Ice hockey in Latvia =

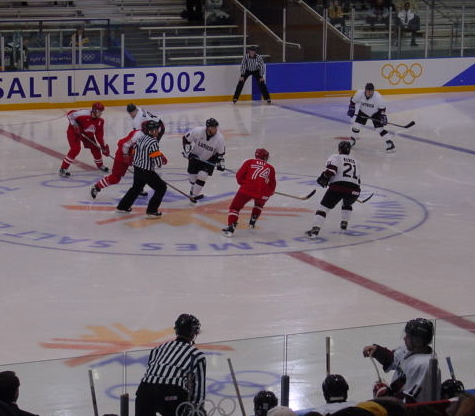
- Country: Latvia
- Governing body: Latvian Ice Hockey Federation
- National teams: Men's national team Women's national team

Club competitions
- Latvian Hockey Higher League

International competitions
- Ice Hockey European Championships; IIHF World Championships; Winter Olympics

Ice hockey is the most popular sport in Latvia. The first hockey match in Latvia took place on February 15, 1909, with two teams facing Union and Strēlnieka Dārzs. However, it took another 20 years to supplant the popular sport of bandy.

== History ==
In 1929, Rīgas Strādnieku Sports un Sargs, a sports club of the Latvian Social Democratic Workers' Party began playing the so-called "Canadian hockey" instead of bandy. The first official game took place one year later, on February 15, 1930, between Riga center and a team from Königsberg. A crew member from Rīga was Bruno Kalniņš, who was sitting in Latvian Parliament at that time and later in political exile in Sweden.

=== The thirties and forties until the outbreak of World War II ===
The Latvian Winter Sports Association began supporting ice hockey in 1930, and as early as 1931 Latvia was admitted to the Ligue Internationale de Hockey sur Glace (LIHG), the predecessor of the IIHF.

With the international recognition of the association, various hockey clubs have emerged in the larger cities, including Universitas Sports, Wanderer, Union, Armijas Sporta Klubs (ASK) from Riga and Olimpiade from Liepāja. The Social Democrats' Club continued to exist before being shut down by regime Kārlis Ulmanis. The said clubs did not play in a closed league with a fixed schedule, but fought in smaller tournaments for titles. In the early years of the Latvian ice hockey ASK Riga dominated the games of the championship and became several Latvian champions.

==== The beginnings of the national team ====
The first official game of the Latvia men's national ice hockey team, which consisted of pure amateurs, took place on February 27, 1932. Lithuania were beaten 3: 0. Only two weeks later, the national team participated for the first time in the European Championship. The Latvian team won one (3: 0 against Romania) and three defeats (0: 7 against Czechoslovakia, 0: 1 against France and 2: 5 against Great Britain). In the overall standings, Latvia took eighth place out of nine participating countries.

A year later, the national team debuted at the World Cup in Prague. At the World Championships in 1935, she first met Canada and lost the game with 0:14. In 1936, Latvia participated for the first time in Winter Olympics, but all three games in Garmisch-Partenkirchen were lost: 0:11 to Canada, 2: 9 to Poland and 1: 7 against Austria. The first international match against the USA dates back to 1938, when Latvia scored a respectable 0: 1. Other international matches were mostly held on the way to or from World Championships as part of friendly matches.

In 1939, the Latvian Ice Hockey Federation contracted Canadian hockey player and sports teacher Larry Marsh to train the national team for a month. The Latvian hockey team had played a total of 26 games, including six wins, 16 defeats and four draws with a goal difference of 37:93, until 1940, the year of Soviet occupation and loss of independence.

==== The time of the occupation ====
The outbreak of World War II and occupation by Soviet Union did indeed change Latvian hockey, but did not end it: the Soviets dissolved the existing teams and created new ones, such as Dinamo Riga. Two years later, when the Germans were re-established, the old teams were re-established, and other teams with typical Latvian names such as "Ledus Lāči, Daugavieši, Skrejošais Holandietis" and "Ledus Simfonija" were created. From 1944 to 1945 no ice hockey was played. In 1946 Latvia was excluded from the LIHG because of its affiliation with the Soviet Union, and only resumed in 1992 after Latvia established the Latvian Ice Hockey Federation in 1991.

=== The Postwar era ===
Before the Second World War in the Soviet Union not hockey, but Bandy was played. After the war, the sporting leadership decided instead to introduce ice hockey, since this was recognized as Olympic sport. For the implementation of this plan, a Soviet delegation from Moscow drove to Riga, which returned there with a handwritten Russian translation of the Canadian ice hockey rules. It can therefore be said that one of the origins of the Russian hockey tradition lies in Latvia.

Only two years after the end of the Second World War and the incorporation of Latvia into the Soviet Union, Dinamo Riga began playing under the new name "Daugava Riga" with pre-war players in the first Soviet league. In 1948, Harijs Mellups became the league's best goalkeeper and was called to the Soviet National Team. Mellups died in the early fifties together with his clubmates near the Russian city Sverdlovsk in a plane crash.

In addition to Daugava, there were other teams such as Rīgas Vagonbūves Rūpnīca (the Latvian [RVR] club RVR), "Spartaks", "VEF" and Latvijas Bērzs, which are based on youth and/or senior level in regional championships. The only top club in Latvia, Daugava, remained in the highest league of the Soviet Union until the 1958–59 season.

Other players from before the war emigrated to Germany, where between 1946 and 1949 up to eight Latvians competed in Augsburg under the nickname "Letten-Team". This team won under the leadership of Latvian players in the Southern German championships in 1948, before the team disbanded later. Rūdolfs Veide ( dt. Rudolf Weide ) began a long and successful career as a player and coach in West Germany. In 1951 he was able to win the German Championship with the legendary Preussen Krefeld and between 1953 and 1954 he completed 18 international matches for the German national team. Later he became director of the Kenston Arena and supported the development of the Duisburg ice hockey.

Another member of the Latvian team was Ēriks Koņeckis, who several times as a player and coach German champion and later held the post of national coach.

With the descent of Daugava into the second division began for the Latvian hockey a time of mediocrity, which lasted until the end of the sixties. In 1968, Daugava was renamed again Dinamo Riga. Despite repeated attempts, the club did not manage to rise from the second Soviet League. Apart from some international friendlies against teams from Finland, Dukla Trenčín and Poldi Kladno from Czechoslovakia, Novosibirsk and Ust-Kamenogorsk, no further events from this period are worth mentioning.

=== The Tikhonov era ===
The development of Latvian hockey got a boost in 1968 with the arrival of the Soviet coach Viktor Tikhonov, who began his legendary coaching career there. He was known for his penchant for discipline and revolutionized training methods using a VCR for game analysis. He also attached great importance to the physical fitness of his players. Due to the low playful potential of the Dinamo players, he set with the establishment of four rows of attack a strategy that used no Soviet team until then. Since this measure has increased the players' breaks between their working hours, the team was able to make up for technical disadvantages by speeding up and improving their condition against more highly rated teams. In 1973 Dinamo Riga could even celebrate the re-emergence in the first league after 14 years.

RVR opened a hockey school in 1967 and a little later Helmuts Balderis produced a superstar. His nickname was "Electric Train" and besides Tikhonov he had a big part in the rise of Dinamo. Together with Tikhonov, he joined CSKA Moscow in 1977, participated in the 1976 Canada Cup with the Soviet national team in the and participated in five world championships and also won the silver medal at the 1980 Winter Olympics in Lake Placid. In addition, he twice won the title of the best scorer of the Soviet League and was once awarded the best striker in the World Cup. The second place of Lake Placid for the team of the USSR, however, was regarded in the home as a great failure. As one of the main culprits for the defeat in the then crucial game against the United States national team, the so-called Miracle on Ice, was also considered Balderis.

Dinamo Riga remained first class until the collapse of the Soviet Union. The ethnic composition of the crew changed dramatically in the 1970s and 1980s as more and more Russians displaced the Latvians. An exception were the goalkeepers Vitālijs Samoilovs and Artūrs Irbe. Irbe gave in the 1986–87 season his debut for Dinamo in the Eliteliga. The following season Dinamo Riga was able to celebrate the biggest success in the club's history by winning Soviet Championship League. With this success Dinamo was entitled to take part in the Super Series, an annual comparison between teams from the USSR and the National Hockey League, in addition to the former Soviet CSKA Moscow champion. In addition, Irbe and Samoilovs were selected in 1988 in the Soviet Union national ice hockey team. The latter was the same year with the national team Olympic champion.

=== The time after 1990 ===
Since the beginning of Mikhail Gorbachev's term of office, Latvians have increasingly begun to strive for Independence. The Latvian Supreme Soviet declared independence of the Republic of Latvia on 4 May 1990. Only after the coup in Moscow in August 1991 followed the international recognition of Latvia. Irbe finally became the hero and role model of the Latvians when he participated in the defense of barricades against the Soviet Army and later refused to continue playing for the Soviet national team. Already in the 1991–92 NHL season he signed his first NHL contract with the San Jose Sharks and also won his first game.

==== Emigrants and returnees ====
Due to the political turmoil, Latvian ice hockey collapsed and players dispersed in leagues around the world. Sandis Ozoliņš played in the fall of 1991 for the juniors of the Soviet national team, but began in 1992 in the International Hockey League to play. In the spring of 1992, Edmonton Oilers and Boston Bruins camps were held in Rīga, under which Sergejs Žoltoks and Grigorijs Panteļejevs were contracted. Many other players tried their luck in North America and played mostly in Minor Leagues, but did not make it into the NHL, so many returned home. Few have come up with a small number of missions in the NHL, such as Harijs Vītoliņš, Viktors Ignatjevs, Kaspars Astašenko, Raitis Ivanāns, Herberts Vasiļjevs and Panteļejevs. Only Irbe, Ozoliņš, Žoltoks and Kārlis Skrastiņš established themselves permanently in the NHL and play there even today. Other players moved to Western Europe or to the top clubs to Moscow. Harijs Vītoliņš soon returned from North America and played for many years for the EHC Chur.

The returnees from North America found a financially troubled country in which the hockey game for survival and players abruptly left their teams as soon as they offered a chance abroad. During the 1990s there was only one ice rink in Latvia, the time-honored Rigas Sporta Pils. Hockey teams emerged and disappeared and changed their names with the current main sponsor. Dinamo Riga was renamed Hockey Club Riga, then Riga stars (after the sponsor A / S Stars ) and finally in Pārdaugava . First, the team played in the Russian Interstate League , later in the Eastern European Hockey League before 1995, the bankruptcy was filed. The team was re-founded under the name Riga Juniors , as today's successor to Dinamo, the HK Riga 2000 can be viewed.

== Governing body ==
The Latvian Ice Hockey Federation organizes amateur and professional ice hockey in the country.

== Domestic league ==
Latvia is one of the smaller member countries of the IIHF with (in 2017) a total of 6,699 registered ice hockey players, including 1,888 juniors and 101 women. There are also 185 registered ice hockey referees in the country. The Latvian Hockey Higher League ( Latvijas Atklātais čempionāts , Open Latvian Championship), which was held between 2006 and 2008 on the basis of the Sponsorship s of the company Samsung "Samsung premjerlīga" was founded in 1931. The first Latvian champions was Rīgas Unions. Between 1946 and 1990, the year of the Latvian Declaration of Independence, no official Latvian championship was played, but nevertheless a tournament was held annually.

In 1990 the Latvian league was a pure Amateur league, nowadays it is a league with pro s and semi-professionals playing in a total of six clubs. One of the participating clubs is the Lithuanian club SC Energija, which was admitted to the league in 2003. In addition to the series champion HK Riga 2000, another team from Riga took part, the SK Riga 20. This team was recruited almost exclusively from members of the Latvian U20 national team. After the Belarus Ice Hockey Federation decided to open its top division (the Belarusian Extraleague) again for foreign teams in the summer of 2008, the four best Latvian teams moved to Belarus. Since then, the new game mode has been in the form of a two-part championship, with the four best teams in the Latvian league and the four participants in the Belarusian extra league playing the Latvian championship in the form of play-offs at the end of the season. As a result of the economic crisis in 2009, the HK Riga 2000 went bankrupt and was dissolved. As a result, the former SK Riga 20 has been integrated into the club Dinamo Riga and will play as Dinamo-Juniors Riga.

Below the Latvian ice hockey league there is a second and third division and an amateur league in which nine teams fought for the title in the 2006–07 season.

=== Reestablishment of Dinamo Riga ===
As part of the opening of the Russian Super League and renaming it in Kontinental Hockey League, a new hockey franchise was founded in Riga in April 2008 called Dinamo Riga and recalling the most successful times of Latvian hockey. Shareholders of the franchise are several companies and individuals, among which Itera Latvija (Latvian gas company belonging to Gazprom), Guntis Ulmanis (the fifth president of Latvia), Aigars Kalvītis (former prime minister of Latvia), Kalvitis has already invested 50,000 lats in Dinamo Riga and is planning another 150,000 lats and Aldis Pauniņš belong. In addition to some foreign players, Latvian national players such as Edgars Masaļskis, Rēdlihs brothers and Aleksandrs Ņiživijs have been committed to increasing the identification of Latvians with this new club. With the HK Riga 2000 a cooperation agreement was concluded, which provides for a player exchange of the two clubs. This is intended to give young and recovering players in particular the opportunity to play in a farm team match practice.

The 2008–09 KHL season began on 2 September 2008, with the game Dinamo Riga against Amur Khabarovsk, with Aleksandrs Ņiživijs 1–0 and thus the first goal in history the KHL scored. At the end of the regular season Dinamo were placed in 10th place and reached the playoffs, where they lost in three games against HC Dynamo Moscow.

== National team ==
During the cold war the Latvian players played ice hockey under the banner of the Soviet Union. Since the fall of the Soviet Union in 1991 Latvians play under the Latvian national team.

After the collapse of the Soviet Union, the IIHF introduced qualifying tournaments for the Ice Hockey World Cup, as many new national associations wanted to participate. The Latvian national team won their qualifying matches against the Baltic neighbors Estonia and Lithuania and was allowed one year later participate in the C-World Cup in Slovenia. The C-championship was won with a 2–0 final victory against Ukraine and Latvia rose to the B-group.

In the following three years, the national team took part in the B World Championships and won it in 1996 just before the Swiss. At their first A Group tournament in 1997, the Latvians took seventh place. Since then, the Latvian national team have always been part of the A-World Championship and have won several victories against the former occupying power, Russia, 2000 in Saint Petersburg and 2003 in Finland on 4 May, the day of the declaration of Latvian independence.

With the success of the national team also strengthened the hockey sport in Latvia. New ice rinks gradually developed and the Latvian Hockey Higher League became the strongest Baltic league after the dissolution of the EEHL, with a team from Lithuania and Estonia playing each. Two new arenas, the Skonto Arena and the Riga Arena were built to host the 2006 Men's World Ice Hockey Championships in Latvia, with a total of 15 ice rinks available. With the rise of the league and the improved play and training opportunities many Latvian players returned and the ethnic composition of the teams changed again in favor of the Latvians. National and local youth programs were launched so that in 2006 the Latvian Junior National Team was allowed to participate in the U20 World Youth Championship in [British Columbia]. In the same year, the Latvian U18 team was able to win Division I, so that in 2007 it was first class and participated in the World U18 Championships, but there again relegated to Division I. In 2008 World Junior Championships, the Latvian under-20 team won the tournament in Riga and returned to the A Group. In addition, Kaspars Daugaviņš was a top scorer and Artūrs Kulda was voted best defender of the tournament.

The Latvian national team has never reached beyond the quarter finals of any major ice hockey tournament, except for the 2023 championship after winning against USA and got a bronze medal.

== Women's Ice Hockey ==
The Latvian women's national team has been involved in international title fights since 1993 and won the B European Championship in the same year, allowing them to participate in the IIHF European Championship in 1995. This tournament was held in Riga and the ladies of the Latvian federation won only sixth place, so the Latvian selection returned to the B-group. A year later, however, the team could celebrate the runner-up of the B-EM.

From 1999, the field of participants of the World Championship was increased. However, the Latvian women were only able to reach a back rank in the Qualifying Tournament for the A World Championship, and since then they have been playing in the IIHF World Championship B Group usually occupy places in the midfield.

The players of the national team are mainly recruited from the two top clubs of Latvian women's hockey, SHK Laima Riga and IceGirls. Two players were also contracted by the Russian women's team Tornado Moskau in 2007, which became the 2006–07 season Russian Champions. The SHK Laima Riga has participated in the IIHF European Women Championships several times and took part in the second round tournament in Berlin in October 2007.

In addition to the SHK Laima Riga and the IceGirls there is a third women's team, LSK Liepāja . These three teams are playing the Latvian Women's Championship among themselves, with the SHK Laima team winning the title in 2006.

== Latvians in the National Hockey League ==
A total of 27 Latvians (6 goalkeepers and 21 outfielders) have already been on the ice in the National Hockey League. The first was Helmuts Balderis, who joined the Minnesota North Stars at the age of 36, to play for them in the 1989–90 season. Sandis Ozoliņš, Artūrs Irbe, Sergejs Žoltoks and Kārlis Skrastiņš are the most successful among them, with Ozoliņš being the first Latvian to win the Stanley Cup. He did so in the 1995–96 NHL season with the Colorado Avalanche. Ozoliņš and Irbe have also played in NHL All-Star Games. Teodors Bļugers became the second Latvian to have won the Stanley Cup in the 2022–23 NHL season with the Vegas Golden Knights. The other Latvian NHL players are Aleksandrs Kerčs, Grigorijs Panteļejevs, Pēteris Skudra, Viktors Ignatjevs, Herberts Vasiļjevs, Kaspars Astašenko, Raitis Ivanāns, Jānis Sprukts, Mārtiņš Karsums, Harijs Vītoliņš, Kaspars Daugaviņš, Artūrs Kulda, Zemgus Girgensons, Teodors Bļugers, Rūdolfs Balcers, Ronalds Ķēniņš, Oskars Bārtulis, Elvis Merzļikins, Kristers Gudļevskis, Kristiāns Rubīns, Artūrs Šilovs and Matīss Kivlenieks.

Sergejs Žoltoks was considered one of the best Latvian players of all time. He was the best scorer of the Latvians in the 2004 World Championship in the Czech Republic and pointed to the NHL – Lockout in the 2004–05 season the experience of 633 NHL games for Boston, Ottawa, Montreal, Edmonton, Minnesota and Nashville. He began his professional career in the Soviet League at the then Dinamo Riga. During the NHL Lockout he played for Dinamo's successor club HK Riga 2000 in the open Belarus league, forfeiting lavish salaries in favor of his hometown club in Russia or Western Europe. His first heart problems were diagnosed with him at the NHL clubs and during an away game in Minsk he suffered a severe heart attack. On November 3, 2004, the Center died of heart failure at the age of 31. The resuscitation attempt of the doctors failed and Žoltoks died in the locker room.

== Fan culture ==
Ice hockey is considered one of Latvia's national sports. Dinamo Riga's successes drew much attention to the sport. In contrast, clubs in the 1990s did not attract many fans to the arenas, whereas the national team has become increasingly popular since its re-founding. For every world championship, large numbers of Latvian fans travel to and support to support national team, despite Latvia being one of the poorest countries in the European Union. "In Oslo they were seen sleeping in buses and outside", said IIHF president René Fasel in 1999 about the fans he described as the best in the world. During the 2000 World Championship, the Latvian Parliament interrupted its sessions so that the politicians could follow the national team's games on television. After beating Russia 3–1, the members of the Opposition and ruling party in the arms and sang together.

At the 2006 World Championship held in Latvia, Latvian fans caused a scandal during their 11–0 defeat against Canada. The audience felt discriminated against by referee Rick Looker in the first period, as he called many penalties against the Latvian team with the Canadian team scoring on the power play. The home crowd, predominantly made up of Latvian supporters, began throwing items onto the ice. The officiating crew took the break so that the ice could be cleaned and the crowd could be calmed down. But trouble began again in the third period as more objects were thrown onto the ice and the teams left the ice once again. To calm the situation, the Latvian player Jānis Sprukts spoke to the audience over the stadium speakers: "Of course the referee makes many mistakes and we are not happy either, but please do not throw anything on the ice." After that, the game ended without further interference from the crowd.

There have also been many Latvians who have gone overseas to play in the Canadian Hockey League hoping to be drafted in the NHL entry draft.
