= Artūrs Irbe =

Latvian ice hockey player and coach

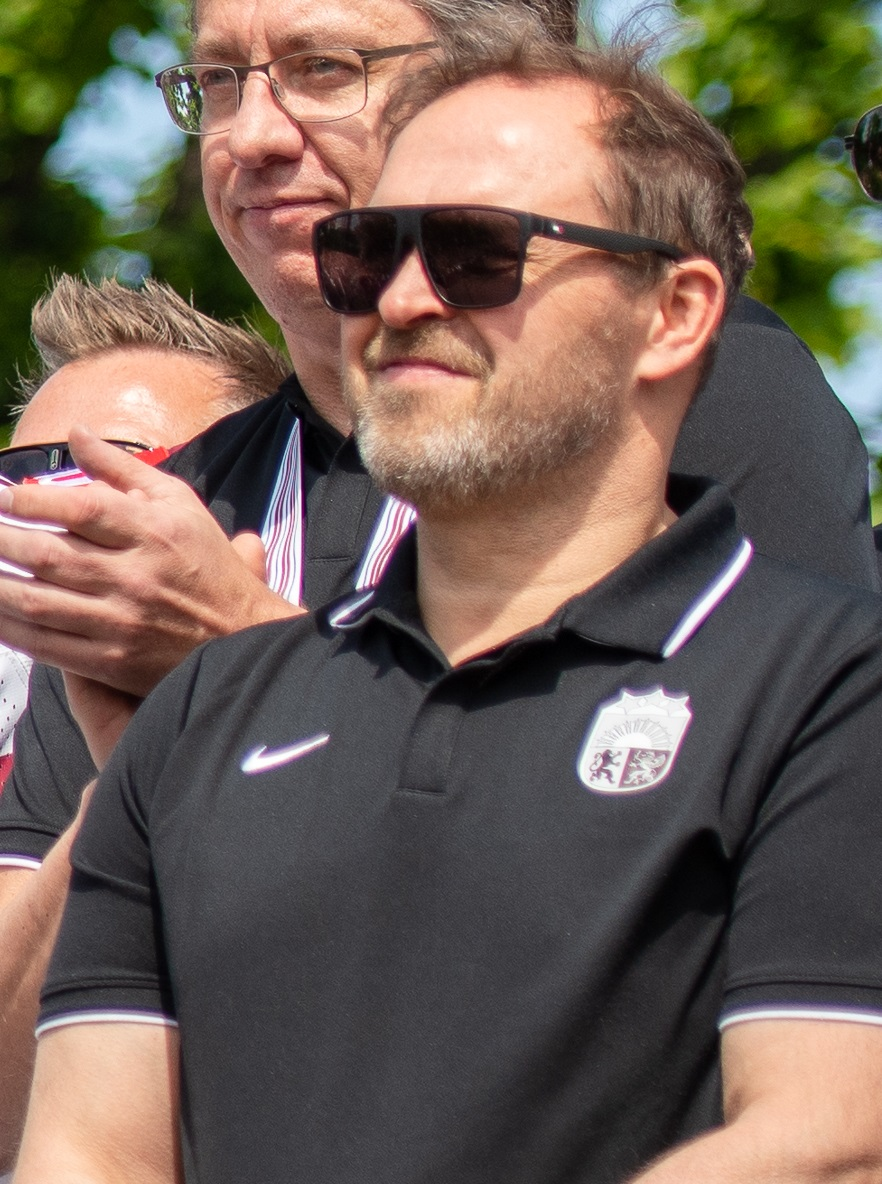
- Irbe in 2023
- Born: 2 February 1967 (age 59) Riga, Latvian SSR, Soviet Union
- Height: 5 ft 8 in (173 cm)
- Weight: 190 lb (86 kg; 13 st 8 lb)
- Position: Goaltender
- Caught: Left
- Played for: Dynamo Riga; San Jose Sharks; Dallas Stars; Vancouver Canucks; Carolina Hurricanes; HK Riga 2000; EC Red Bull Salzburg; SK Rīga 20; Hk Dynamax Oil Nitra
- National team: Soviet Union and Latvia
- NHL draft: 196th overall, 1989; Minnesota North Stars
- Playing career: 1981–2007
Medal record
Men's ice hockey
Representing Soviet Union
World Championships
Gold medal – first place	1989 Sweden	Team
Gold medal – first place	1990 Switzerland	Team
Goodwill Games
Gold medal – first place	1990 Seattle	Team
European Junior Championships
Silver medal – second place	1985 France	Team

Artūrs Irbe (born 2 February 1967) is a Latvian professional ice hockey coach and former goaltender. Born during the Soviet era, Irbe played for various Soviet league teams and the Soviet Union national team before moving to North America in 1991. Irbe played in the National Hockey League (NHL) for the San Jose Sharks, Dallas Stars, Vancouver Canucks, and Carolina Hurricanes. In 2004 Irbe returned to Europe to play until he retired in 2007. He has served as a goaltending coach with Dinamo Riga, the Washington Capitals, and the Buffalo Sabres, as well as internationally with the Latvia men's national ice hockey team. He was inducted into the IIHF Hall of Fame in 2010. Irbe was rated number 93 on The Hockey News list of the Top 100 Goalies of All-Time in 2018.

== Playing career ==
Irbe was drafted in the 10th round, 196th overall, by the Minnesota North Stars in the 1989 NHL entry draft.

Irbe's first professional hockey team was Dinamo Riga of the Soviet Hockey League (from 1987 to 1991). After playing in only two games during the 1986–87 season, Irbe received a chance to become Dinamo Riga's number one goaltender during the 1987–88 season when their starting goaltender and Olympic champion, Vitali Samoilov, incurred a long-term injury. In his only full professional season, Irbe was outstanding in helping Dinamo Riga advance to the finals of the Soviet Hockey League, where they eventually lost to perennial Soviet champions CSKA Moscow. During this period, he also played for the Soviet Union in the World Championships in 1989 and 1990. The Soviet team won those two championships and Irbe was honoured as the best goalkeeper of the 1990 tournament. He refused to play for the Soviet Union in 1991 because Latvia had proclaimed independence from the Soviet Union on 4 May 1990 and the Soviet government attempted to use military force in January 1991 to stop Latvia's independence. When the Moscow government sent tanks into Riga, Irbe was among those who took to the streets and put up barriers to protect buildings, radio stations, TV towers and historical landmarks.

In the 1988–89 season, Irbe travelled to North America with his then club Dinamo Riga to play in a series of exhibition games against National Hockey League (NHL) teams. The next season (1989–90), he was temporarily added to the CSKA Moscow team during an exhibition tour of North America.

=== NHL ===
Irbe began his playing career in North America with the International Hockey League (IHL) affiliate of the NHL's San Jose Sharks, the Kansas City Blades. During the 1991–92 season with the Blades, he led the IHL in goals against average, playoffs games played, playoffs minutes played, playoffs wins, playoffs most goals allowed, playoffs assists and playoffs penalty minutes, and led the team to win the Turner Cup league championship.

In the 1991–92 season, Irbe also played in 14 games with the Sharks, with whom he would remain until the 1995–96 season. With Irbe playing goaltender, the newly established Sharks made their first playoff appearance in the 1993–94 season and upset the top-seeded Detroit Red Wings. That season, Irbe played an NHL record 4,412 minutes in goal for the Sharks. Irbe, affectionately known as "Archie", was nicknamed "The Wall" and became a cult figure in San Jose, a status he enjoys there to this day. Following an injury (his hand being mauled by his pet dog in the off-season) and a poor 1995–96 season, Irbe was released by the Sharks.

For the next two years, Irbe served as the backup goaltender for the Dallas Stars and the Vancouver Canucks (for whom he played significant stretches with ample success) until he became the starter for the Carolina Hurricanes in the 1998–99 season. Irbe was picked to be a member of the World NHL All-Star team in the 1998–99 season, where he became the first goaltender to record an assist in an NHL All-Star Game. The highest point of his career with the Hurricanes was the 2001–02 season, when Irbe was instrumental in leading the Hurricanes to the Stanley Cup finals, where Carolina fell to the Detroit Red Wings.

=== Demotion to ECHL ===
After a disappointing 2002–03 season, the Hurricanes looked to demote Irbe because they could not move him due to the no-trade clause in his contract. On 16 October 2003, Irbe was assigned to the Johnstown Chiefs of the ECHL. After going 8–2–1 in 11 games with the Chiefs, Irbe was named as the starter for the Eastern Conference in the 2004 ECHL All-Star Game. However, Irbe was unable to participate due to a wrist injury. On 19 March 2004, Irbe was recalled to the Carolina Hurricanes after goaltender Kevin Weekes was placed on the injured reserve list due to season-ending hand surgery.

=== Last days in the NHL ===
Irbe played his last game in the NHL on 4 April 2004 against the Florida Panthers, where he was replaced by Kevin Weekes in the third period after conceding six goals. The game would end in a 6–6 tie, which would ultimately be the final tie in NHL history as the league moved to shootout in the following season in the 2005–06 season.

In June 2004, Irbe was traded to the Columbus Blue Jackets, but never played with the club due to that year's NHL lockout. After the lockout canceled the 2004–05 season, Irbe never played in the NHL again, choosing to continue his career in Europe.

=== Return to Europe ===
Irbe played for HK Riga 2000 in Latvia and EC Red Bull Salzburg in Austria during the 2004–05 season. He signed with HK Dynamax Nitra playing in the Slovak Ice Hockey Extraliga, but he decided to leave after his unsatisfactory results.

== Equipment ==
Irbe's helmet and padding – worn continuously since his NHL debut for the San Jose Sharks – was creased and scuffed with puck marks and stains. He earned the nickname "Michelin Man" as a result.

In the early 2000s, he placed an ad in the Ottawa Pennysaver seeking any resident with the famed Jofa goaltender mask.

== Coaching career ==
In 2008, Irbe signed a three-year contract with Dinamo Riga to work as the goaltending coach for the club. In August 2009, Irbe cut ties with Riga and decided to go back to North America to be the goaltending coach of the NHL's Washington Capitals after former goaltending coach Dave Prior resigned for family reasons. Irbe left the team on 11 June 2011, to spend more time with his family.

In 2013, Irbe was named as Ted Nolan's assistant for the Latvian national team, but resigned a year after a dispute with president of the Latvian Ice Hockey Federation Kirovs Lipmans over his coaching certification. In August 2014, Nolan again hired Irbe as an assistant, this time with the Buffalo Sabres.

While serving with Buffalo in 2014 at age 47, Irbe dressed as a goaltender after the injury of Michal Neuvirth to be the back-up goaltender for Jhonas Enroth.

In August 2017, Irbe became a consultant for the Latvian hockey league club HK Kurbads.

During the 2023 IIHF World Championship co-hosted in Tampere, Finland, and Riga, Latvia, Irbe won a bronze medal together with the Latvian national team as a goaltending coach. In addition, Latvian national team goaltender Artūrs Šilovs was named the MVP of the 2023 IIHF World Championship.

== Personal ==
Irbe is also a member of board of directors of the Kids First Fund, a non-profit organization based in the United States which raises money for projects assisting abused and abandoned children in Latvia.

At the 2006 Winter Olympics in Turin, Irbe was Latvia's flag-bearer in the opening ceremonies.

== Career statistics ==
_{Bolded numbers indicate season leader}

=== Regular season and playoffs ===
			Regular season										Playoffs
Season	Team	League	GP	W	L	T	OTL	MIN	GA	SO	GAA	SV%	GP	W	L	MIN	GA	SO	GAA	SV%
1983–84	Latvijas Berzs Riga	USSR-3	1	—	—	—	—	—	—	—	—	—	—	—	—	—	—	—	—	—
1984–85	Latvijas Berzs Riga	USSR-3	—	—	—	—	—	—	—	—	—	—	—	—	—	—	—	—	—	—
1985–86	RASMS Riga	USSR-3	9	—	—	—	—	—	20	—	—	—	—	—	—	—	—	—	—	—
1986–87	RASMS Riga	USSR-3	47	—	—	—	—	2643	134	—	3.04	—	—	—	—	—	—	—	—	—
1986–87	Dinamo Riga	USSR	2	—	—	—	—	27	1	0	2.22	—	—	—	—	—	—	—	—	—
1987–88	Dinamo Riga	USSR	34	—	—	—	—	1870	86	4	2.76	—	—	—	—	—	—	—	—	—
1987–88	RASMS Riga	USSR-3	5	—	—	—	—	—	11	—	2.32	—	—	—	—	—	—	—	—	—
1988–89	Dinamo Riga	USRR	40	—	—	—	—	2460	116	4	2.83	—	—	—	—	—	—	—	—	—
1989–90	Dinamo Riga	USSR	48	—	—	—	—	2880	115	2	2.40	—	—	—	—	—	—	—	—	—
1990–91	Dinamo Riga	USSR	46	—	—	—	—	2713	133	5	2.94	—	—	—	—	—	—	—	—	—
1991–92	Kansas City Blades	IHL	32	24	7	1	—	1955	80	0	2.46	.911	15	12	3	914	44	0	2.89	—
1991–92	San Jose Sharks	NHL	13	2	6	3	—	645	48	0	4.47	.868	—	—	—	—	—	—	—	—
1992–93	Kansas City Blades	IHL	6	3	3	0	—	364	20	0	3.30	.876	—	—	—	—	—	—	—	—
1992–93	San Jose Sharks	NHL	36	7	26	0	—	2074	142	1	4.11	.886	—	—	—	—	—	—	—	—
1993–94	San Jose Sharks	NHL	**74**	30	28	**16**	—	**4412**	209	3	2.84	.899	14	7	7	806	50	0	3.72	.875
1994–95	San Jose Sharks	NHL	38	14	19	3	—	2043	111	4	3.26	.895	6	2	4	369	32	0	5.20	.848
1995–96	Kansas City Blades	IHL	4	1	2	1	—	226	16	0	4.24	.843	—	—	—	—	—	—	—	—
1995–96	San Jose Sharks	NHL	22	4	12	4	—	1112	85	0	4.59	.860	—	—	—	—	—	—	—	—
1996–97	Dallas Stars	NHL	35	17	12	3	—	1965	88	3	2.69	.893	1	0	0	12	0	0	0.00	1.000
1997–98	Vancouver Canucks	NHL	41	14	11	6	—	1999	91	2	2.73	.907	—	—	—	—	—	—	—	—
1998–99	Carolina Hurricanes	NHL	62	27	20	12	—	3643	135	6	2.22	.923	6	2	4	408	15	0	2.21	.917
1999–00	Carolina Hurricanes	NHL	**75**	34	28	9	—	4345	**175**	5	2.42	.906	—	—	—	—	—	—	—	—
2000–01	Carolina Hurricanes	NHL	**77**	37	29	9	—	**4406**	**180**	6	2.45	.908	6	2	4	360	20	0	3.34	.900
2001–02	Carolina Hurricanes	NHL	51	20	19	**11**	—	2974	126	3	2.54	.902	18	10	8	1078	30	1	1.67	.938
2002–03	Lowell Lock Monsters	AHL	7	3	3	1	—	427	21	0	2.95	.908	—	—	—	—	—	—	—	—
2002–03	Carolina Hurricanes	NHL	34	7	24	2	—	1884	100	0	3.18	.877	—	—	—	—	—	—	—	—
2003–04	Johnstown Chiefs	ECHL	14	10	3	1	—	847	30	1	2.13	.927	—	—	—	—	—	—	—	—
2003–04	Carolina Hurricanes	NHL	10	5	2	1	—	564	23	0	2.45	.899	—	—	—	—	—	—	—	—
2004–05	HK Riga 2000	BXL	29	—	—	—	—	—	—	—	2.04	—	—	—	—	—	—	—	—	—
2005–06	HK Riga 2000	BXL	18	—	—	—	—	—	—	—	—	—	—	—	—	—	—	—	—	—
2005–06	EC Red Bull Salzburg	AUT	17	9	6	—	1	1012	35	0	**2.08**	.914	10	—	—	—	—	—	2.53	.907
2005–06	HK Riga 2000	LAT	18	—	—	—	—	—	—	—	1.95	—	—	—	—	—	—	—	—	—
2006–07	SK Riga 20	LAT	4	0	4	—	0	240	21	0	5.25	—	—	—	—	—	—	—	—	—
2006–07	HK Dynamax - Oil Nitra	SVK	6	1	2	—	3	249	22	0	5.31	.814	—	—	—	—	—	—	—	—
USSR totals			173	—	—	—	—	9859	451	15	2.74	—	—	—	—	—	—	—	—	—
NHL totals			568	218	236	79	—	32,066	1513	33	2.83	.899	51	23	27	2981	142	1	2.86	.902

=== International ===
Bolded numbers indicate tournament leader

Year	Team	Event	GP	W	L	T	MIN	GA	SO	GAA	SV%
1985	Soviet Union	EJC	5				300	5		1.00
1989	Soviet Union	WC	3	3	0	0	175	5	0	1.71
1990	Soviet Union	WC	6	**4**	0	1	315	5	1	**0.95**	.950
1996	Latvia	WC B	4	3	0	1	240	7	0	1.75	.933
1997	Latvia	WC	5	4	0	1	300	10	1	2.00	.930
1998	Latvia	WC	6	3	2	1	358	17	1	2.85	.893
1999	Latvia	WC	4	2	2	0	238	12	0	3.02	.861
2000	Latvia	WC	5	3	1	1	420	17	0	2.43	.906
2001	Latvia	WC	6	3	2	1	360	13	**2**	2.17	.924
2002	Latvia	OG	1	0	1	0	60	4	0	4.00	.862
2003	Latvia	WC	3	2	1	0	180	9	0	3.00	.901
2004	Latvia	WC	5	2	1	2	300	9	0	1.80	.925
2005	Latvia	WC	6	2	3	1	283	7	2	1.48	.944
2006	Latvia	OG	3	0	2	1	148	14	0	5.68	.833
Senior totals			53	—	—	—	3137	122	7	2.33	—

=== Super Series statistics ===
The Super Series were exhibition games between an NHL team and Soviet teams (usually a club from the Soviet Championship League). Irbe competed in two such series.

Year	Team	Event	GP	W	L	T	MIN	GA	SO	GAA
1988–89	Dynamo Riga	Super-S	7	2	4	1	425	23	0	3.25
1990	CSKA Moscow	Super-S	4	3	1	0	300	18	1	2.50
Super Series totals			11	5	5	1	725	41	1	2.88

== Awards ==
=== International ===
Award	Year
EJC Best Goaltender	1985
WC Best Goaltender	1990
IIHF Hall of Fame	2010
IIHF All-Time Latvia Team	2020

=== Soviet ===
Award	Year
Rookie of the Year	1988

=== IHL ===
Award	Year(s) awarded
Turner Cup	1992
IHL First All-Star Team	1992
James Norris Memorial Trophy (IHL)	1992 (Shared with Wade Flaherty)

=== NHL ===
Award	Year
NHL All-Star Game	1994, 1999

=== San Jose Sharks ===
Award	Year
Player of the Year	1994

=== ECHL ===
Award	Year(s) awarded
ECHL All-Star Game	2004 (DNP, wrist injury)

=== San Jose ===
Award	Year
San Jose Sports Hall of Fame	2010

== Transactions ==
- June 17, 1989 – Drafted by Minnesota in the 10th round, 196th overall
- May 30, 1991 – San Jose in National Hockey League dispersal draft
- July 22, 1996 – Signed as a free agent by Dallas
- August 5, 1997 – Signed as a free agent by Vancouver
- September 10, 1998 – Signed as a free agent by Carolina
- February 8, 2003 – Placed on waivers by Hurricanes
- June 16, 2004 – Traded by Hurricanes to Columbus Blue Jackets for future considerations
- December 5, 2005 – Signed as a free agent by Salzburg
- November 18, 2014 – Signed as player-coach by Buffalo Sabres on an emergency backup contract
