= Kirovs Lipmans =

Latvian business person and ice hockey executive (born 1940)

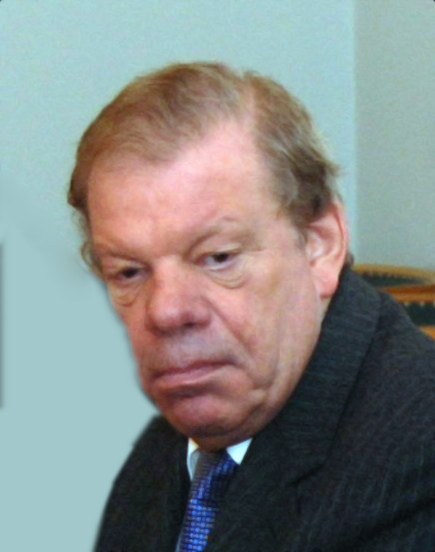
- Born: 5 November 1940 (age 85); Liepāja, Latvia
- Education: Leningrad Institute of Railway and Transport Engineering, University of Latvia
- Occupation: Business person
- Known for: Grindeks, Latvian Ice Hockey Federation, Latvian Olympic Committee
- Awards: Paul Loicq Award, Order of the Three Stars

Kirovs Lipmans (born 5 November 1940) is a Jewish Latvian business person and former ice hockey executive. He served as president of the Latvian Ice Hockey Federation from 1994 to 1995, and from 1998 to 2016; was a member of the Latvian Olympic Committee executive, and sat on International Ice Hockey Federation (IIHF) committees. He oversaw the increase of artificial ice hockey rinks in Latvia from three to seventeen, and the Latvia men's national team qualify for the top tier of the World Championships then play in four consecutive Olympic hockey tournaments. Lipmans oversaw the construction of Arena Riga for the hosting the 2006 IIHF World Championship, and Latvia was awarded co-hosting duties for the 2021 IIHF World Championship at the end of his presidency.

Lipmans in a native of Liepāja, graduated from the Leningrad Institute of Railway and Transport Engineering and the University of Latvia, and has worked as an economist. As chairman of the council of Grindeks since 2003, the company increased of annual profits from €10,000,000 in 2005 to €187,000,000 in 2021. He oversaw the construction of a production facility and laboratories, and transitioned Grindeks into a global company that exported 90 per cent of its products. He was made an Officer of the Order of the Three Stars for contributions to Latvia, and received the Paul Loicq Award from the IIHF for contributions to international ice hockey.

== Early life and education ==
Kirovs Lipmans was born on 5 November 1940 in Liepāja, Latvia, to parents Haim and Rose, and has Jewish Latvian descent. Lipmans has stated that his maternal family has lived in Aizpute for more than 250 years, and that a distant relative, Aaron Levi Lipman on his father's side was a court Jew to Ernst Johann von Biron, the Duke of Courland. Lipmans's father Haim was killed during the Holocaust in Latvia. Prior to the German occupation of Latvia during World War II, Kirovs and his mother evacuated to the Russian SFSR for the duration of the war. They were the only survivors of their family, whose property was confiscated. At age 15, Lipmans apprenticed as a repairman at the linoleum factory in Liepāja.

Lipmans began school education in Liepāja, initially learning in the Latvian language. In second grade, he transferred to a Russian-language school. While attending school in Leningrad, he began playing football. He graduated from the Leningrad Polytechnic Institute in 1961, and the Leningrad Institute of Railway and Transport Engineering in 1975. Lipmans later stated in an interview to Santa magazine that just before enrolling in the Railway Institute, he was accepted into the Leningrad Circus School's clown course, but was forbidden to continue by his mother. He later worked for Valsts elektrotehniskā fabrika (VEF; State Electrotechnical Factory) as an economist, and as head of its computer base center. During the Singing Revolution, he was chairman of the co-operative VEF-Radio. He later graduated from the University of Latvia with an engineer economist degree.

== Business career ==
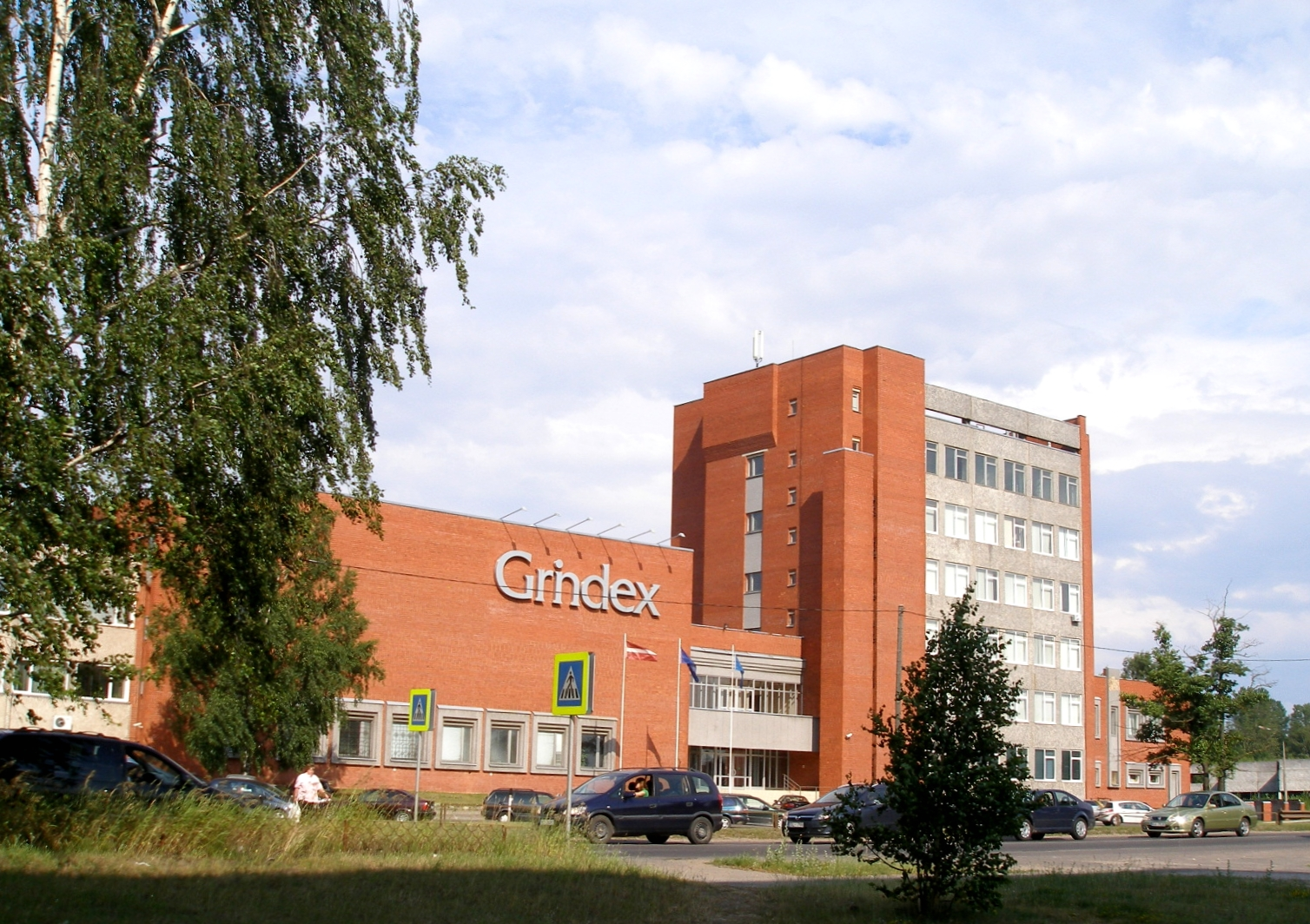
Grindeks headquarters

Lipmans was president of Liepājas Metalurgs from 1996 to 2003, a metallurgy facility in Liepāja. He served as a deputy on the Liepāja City Council from 2000 to 2004, as a candidate of the Christian Democratic Union. He has been the chairman of the council of Grindeks since 2003, and also served as chairman of the councils of JSC Kalceks and JSC Tallinn pharmaceutical facilities, and as chairman of the board of Liplat Holdings Limited. As of 2015, he was co-chairman of the Latvia-Belarus Economic Co-operation Council.

Lipmans purchased a controlling interest in Grindeks from 2005 to 2006, when the company had an annual profit of €10,000,000. Profits grew annually and by 2010, Latvian newspaper Ir reported him to be the second-richest person in the country. Annual profits for Grindeks had increased to €147,000,000 by 2018, and Lipmans had overseen the construction of a new production facility and laboratories. He transitioned Grindeks from having the majority of its sales in Commonwealth of Independent States countries, into a company with 90 per cent of its products exported and a presence in European, Asian and American markets. As of 2021, Lipmans and his son Filips owned 50.02 per cent of the company's shares and Grindeks had annual profits of €187,000,000. In May 2021, the Riga Regional Court fined them €1,900,000 for selling state-owned Grindeks shares in 2017, which Lipmans felt was politically motivated litigation.

== Ice hockey career ==
Lipmans served as president of the Latvian Ice Hockey Federation (LHF) from 1994 to 1995, and from 1998 to 2016; and was also a member of the Latvian Olympic Committee executive. He was appointed an advisor to International Ice Hockey Federation (IIHF) president René Fasel; and sat on the IIHF committees for strategy development, discipline and statutes. As the LHF president, he oversaw the Latvia men's national team improve from the third tier of the World Championships in 1993, to qualification for the top tier in 1997. The national team remained at the top tier during his tenure as president, and participated in four consecutive Olympic hockey tournaments from 2002 to 2014. Lipmans was also involved in operating professional hockey teams in Latvia, and served as president of HK Liepājas Metalurgs from 1996 to 2003. He was later a founding member of Dinamo Riga, and resigned from its council in 2008 to avoid a conflict of interest as the LHF president.

Arena Riga

When Lipmans began as LHF president, Latvia had only three artificial ice hockey rinks of which two met IIHF standards. As of 2015, this number had grown to 17 artificial ice rinks. The LHF was awarded hosting duties for the 2006 IIHF World Championship, and Lipmans oversaw the construction of Arena Riga for the event. The 11,000-seat arena was a requirement for hosting the World Championship, and was delayed due to disagreements on the construction contract and finding an investor to fund the project. The Baltic Times reported that Lipmans was to blame for the delays, and that he was asked to resign due to a conflict of interest with owning shares in the arena's management company. The LHF also hosted lower division tournaments of the IIHF World Women's Championship in 2000, 2003, 2004, 2008, 2012 and 2014. At the end of his presidency, the LHF was awarded co-hosting duties with Belarus for the 2021 IIHF World Championship. Lipmans was succeeded by Aigars Kalvītis as the LHF president in October 2016.

== Honors and legacy ==
Lipmans was recognized for his contributions to Latvia when made an Officer of the Order of the Three Stars in 2001, and was given the Sportsperson of the Year Award from the Latvian Sports Federation in 2006. He received the "Valetudo Patriae" (Health for the Motherland Award) from the Latvian Medical Association in 2017, in recognition of contributions to the development of medicines and health care. He received the Paul Loicq Award from the IIHF in 2018, in recognition of contributions to international ice hockey.

His biography, Kirovs Lipmans: Life Story, written by journalist Ksenia Zagorovsky, was published in 2025.

== Personal life ==
Lipmans is married to Anna Lipmans (born 1948), a neurologist and member of the Latvian Medical Association. They have a family home in Jūrmala, and have donated money to sports and children; and sponsored concerts including Inese Galante's opera Summertime, and the Jurmala Young Pop Singer Competition operated by Laima Vaikule. He contributed financial support to the Liepāja Museum to host an exhibition about local Jewish people.

In a 2020 interview, Lipmans stated that his mother always said, "You live in Latvia, and you have to leave something good for this country". When his cousins in the United States and Canada asked him to leave Latvia during the political changes in the 1990s, Lipmans expressed a desire to stay and stated, "No, I will stay in Latvia, because this is my country, and I will do my best to make this a good and rich country". He stated that his personal motto in life has been, "If I promise something, I will do it"!
