= Providus =

Latvian non-governmental think-tank

- Centre for Public Policy PROVIDUS
- Formation: 2002; 24 years ago
- Founder: Soros Foundation
- Founded at: Rīga, Latvia
- Type: Nonprofit, non-governmental, non-partisian think-tank
- Purpose: policy, anti-corruption
- Leader: Iveta Kažoka
- Funding: European Commission, Open Society Foundation in Europe, Friedrich Ebert Foundation, Konrad Adenauer Foundation, Sabiedrības integrācijas fonds (English: Society Integration Foundation), Teterevu fonds (English: The Boris and Inara Teterev Foundation) and others
- Website: providus.lv

PROVIDUS (Full title: Centre for Public Policy PROVIDUS) is a Latvian non-governmental, non-partisan and non-profit think-tank, established by the Soros Foundation in 2002. Think-tank PROVIDUS is a non-governmental organisation operating in the public interest and they are officially recognized as such. PROVIDUS’ mission is to promote evidence-based policy and open society values.

== History and structure ==
PROVIDUS was established in 2002. The think-tank consists of its board, council and members. Initial founders of PROVIDUS are: Soros Foundation Latvia (now known as "Fonds atvērtai sabiedrībai DOTS"), Indra Dedze, Vita Anda Tērauda, Nellija Ločmele, Didzis Poreiters, Agnese Frīdenberga.

Current organisation's members are individuals that support PROVIDUS' goals, some of the current members are also initiation founders of the think-tank: Lolita Čigāne, Ilze Dzenovska, Valts Kalniņš, Andrejs Judins, Linda Austere, Iveta Kažoka, Dace Akule, Marija Golubeva, Marta Herca, Linda Curika, Ilze Ārnesta, Gatis Litvins, Agnese Lāce, Rasmuss Filips Geks, Līga Stafecka, Linda Jākobsone, Marta Rikša, Olafs Grigus.

PROVIDUS council's members are FDC Chairwoman, Dr.habil.oec. Inna Šteinbuka, partner of Law firm FORT and attorney-at-law Sandis Bērtaitis, public administration consultant Ivo Rollis and PROVIDUS leading researcher Agnese Frīdenberga.

Current director of PROVIDUS (since 2018) is Iveta Kažoka. Previous directors: current member of the Parliament of Latvia Krista Baumane, Dace Akule, current member of the Parliament of Latvia Vita Anda Tērauda.

== Field of work ==
PROVIDUS aims to assist the politicians of Latvia in making better political decisions, fulfills watchdog's functions in the country's politics and promotes citizen engagement in various forms - both on a national and regional level.

From 2017 until 2020 PROVIDUS worked with questions and issues related to migration, political parties and capacity strengthening of public administration, fight against corruption, as well as a fight against populism.

PROVIDUS' main methods of work include research, analysis of policies and legislations, providing recommendations and expert-opinions on legislations and actions, monitoring development of policies, providing political proposals, as well as organizing discussions and educational events.

The PROVIDUS team consists of 7 employees and 5 associated researchers. PROVIDUS council consists of 4 experts.

== Projects ==
PROVIDUS researchers organize and execute various projects of national and international level in cooperation with organisations from Latvia and abroad.

In 2019 PROVIDUS finished and/or continued the following projects:

- Preparing for the EP election Takeoff),
- Meaningful feedback for courts,
- Līdzdalība valsts politikas veidošanas un uzraudzības procesos 2019 (English: Participation in the formation and monitoring of country's political processes 2019),
- Engaging municipalities: introducing best practices of civic involvement in decision—making Project's results were presented in a conference "Public Engagement in Local Municipalities: Development and Innovations in Latvia and Europe".
- Thematical workshops for NGO leaders,
- Starptautiskās aizsardzības saņēmēju integrācijas izvērtēšana un uzlabošana (English: Measuring and improving integration of beneficiaries of international protection),
- Towards a Citizens’ Union – 2CU.

== Sources of funding ==
PROVIDUS projects are funded with support from the European Commission, Open Society Foundation in Europe, Friedrich Ebert Foundation, Konrad Adenauer Foundation, Sabiedrības integrācijas fonds (English: Society Integration Foundation), Teterevu fonds (English: The Boris and Inara Teterev Foundation) and others.

== PROVIDUS' directresses ==
Year	Name, last name
2018—now	Iveta Kažoka
2016—2018	Krista Baumane
2013—2016	Dace Akule
2002—2013	Vita Tērauda
