= Reinis Uzulnieks =

Latvian politician (born 1986)

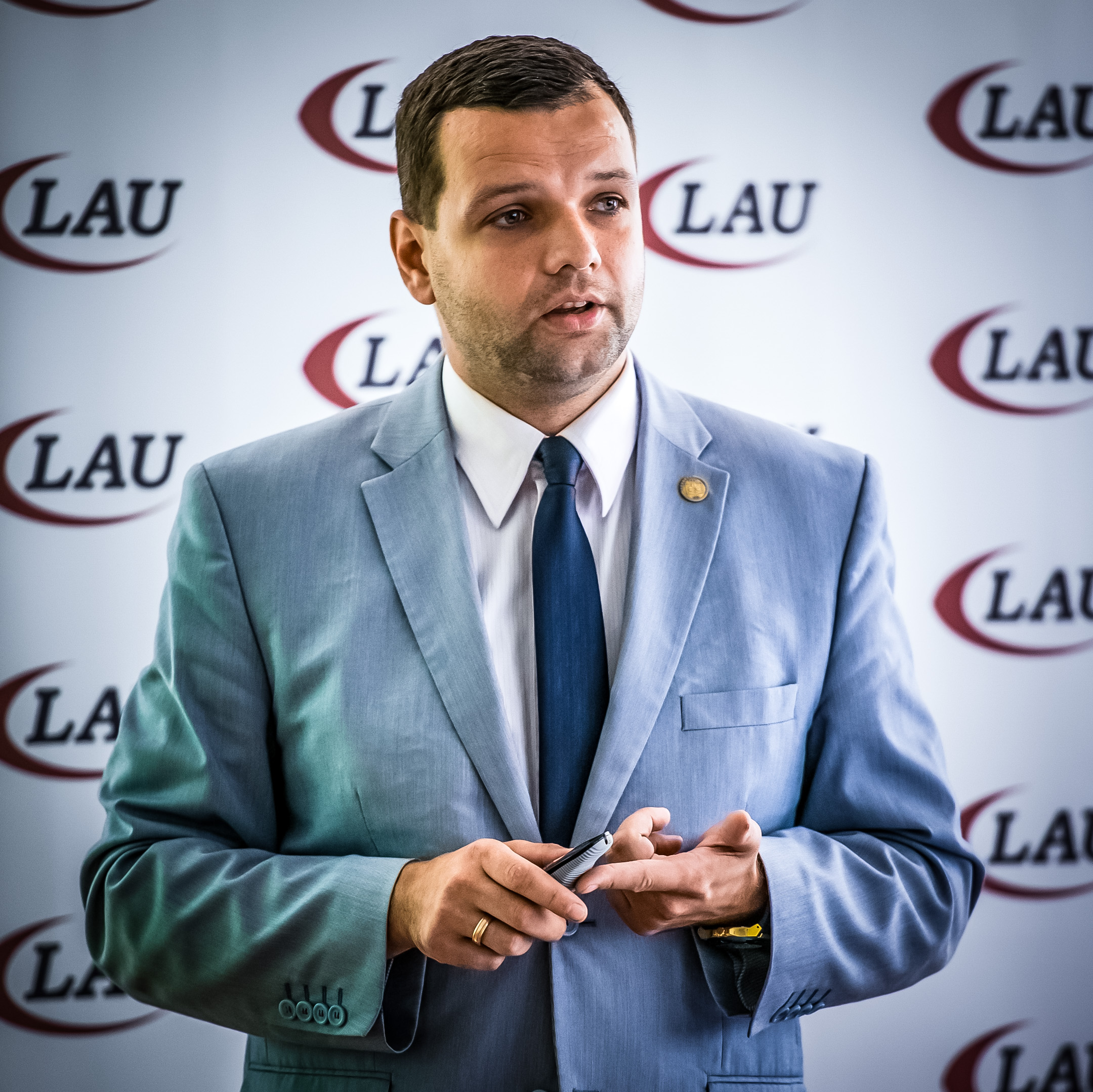
- Uzulnieks in 2018

Minister of Welfare
- In office 6 March 2025 – 13 September 2026
- Prime Minister: Evika Siliņa; Andris Kulbergs
- Preceded by: Uldis Augulis
- Succeeded by: Uldis Augulis (acting)

Personal details
- Born: 28 July 1986 (age 40)
- Party: Latvian Farmers' Union (2012-2026)

Reinis Uzulnieks (born 28 July 1986) is a Latvian politician who served as Minister of Welfare from 2025 to 2026 and is a former member of the Latvian Farmers’ Union. He served as parliamentary secretary of the Ministry of Welfare from 2014 to 2016 and from 2023 to 2025.

On 13 September 2026, Uzulnieks was detained by Latvian State Police, removed from his position as Minister of Welfare and expelled from the Farmers’ Union, after it was discovered that he was caught by police for driving under the influence.
