= Marija Golubeva =

Latvian politician and political scientist

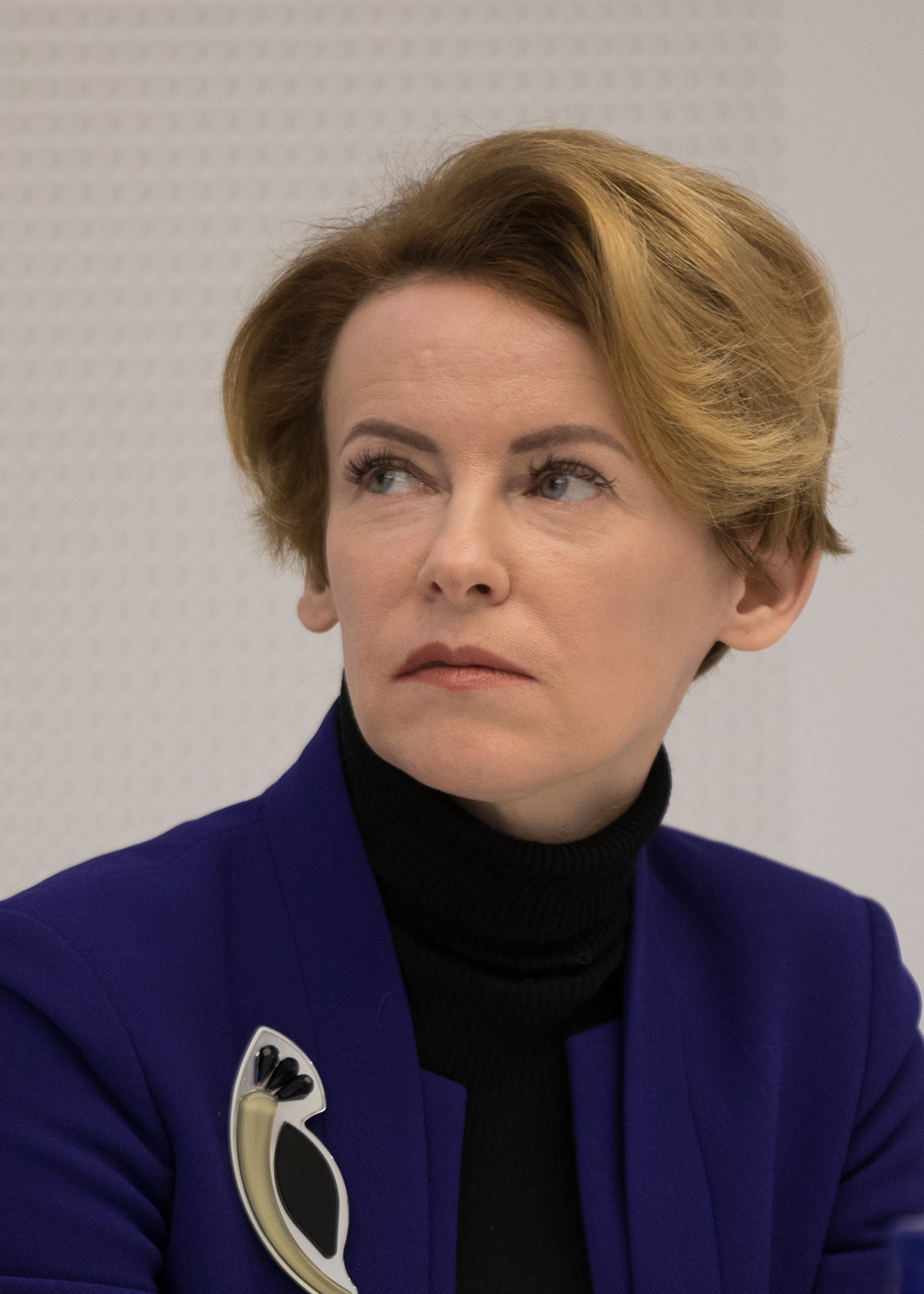
- Golubeva in 2019

Minister of the Interior
- In office 3 June 2021 – 16 May 2022
- Preceded by: Sandis Ģirģens
- Succeeded by: Artis Pabriks

Member of 13th Saeima
- In office 6 November 2018 – 1 November 2022
- Parliamentary group: Development/For!

Personal details
- Born: 28 June 1973 (age 53)
- Domestic partner: Diāna Ieleja
- Education: University of Latvia (BA); Central European University (MA); University of Cambridge (PhD)
- Occupation: Politician; Political scientist; Historian

Marija Golubeva (born 28 June 1973) is a Latvian politician of Russian descent, political scientist, and historian. She was a member of the 13th Saeima and leader of the Development/For! Saeima fraction, and she also was elected by the Presidium of the Saeima to serve in the Saeima Secretariat. She served as Minister of the Interior of Latvia. In her academic work, she specializes in immigration policy and education policy. Since 2023, she is a Richard von Weizsäcker Fellow at the Robert Bosch Academy.

== Life and career ==
Golubeva studied English philology at the University of Latvia, graduating with a Bachelor's Degree in 1994. In 1995, she obtained a Master's Degree in history from the Central European University. She then attended the University of Cambridge, where she earned her doctorate in 2000.

In 1999, Golubeva became a Lecturer at the Latvian Academy of Culture, where she taught courses in cultural history. In the 2001–2002 school year, she was the acting head of the Department of Political Science at Riga Stradiņš University, and the following year she served as the head of a research center at The Vidzeme University of Applied Sciences. She then worked as a consultant at the State Chancellery, and from 2004 to 2012 and again from 2014 to 2016 she worked as a researcher at the Latvian public policy research center Providus. She has also consulted for ICF International. She particularly specializes in the study of education policy and immigration policy.

In 2017, Golubeva was a founding member of the Movement For! party, and she was elected to its first board.

In the 2018 Latvian parliamentary election, Golubeva was elected to the Saeima. She was then also elected deputy Secretary of the Saeima.

In on 3 June 2021, after the redistribution of ministerial positions in the government of Krišjānis Kariņas due to the withdrawal of the KPV LV party from the government, she was elected as the Minister of Interior of the Republic of Latvia. On 16 May 2022 M. Golubeva resigned from the position of the Minister of Interior after the National Union, one of the coalition partners, expressed distrust regarding the activities of law enforcement agencies during the laying of flowers at the Victory Monument in Riga on 9 and 10 May. On 19 May M. Golubeva renewed her mandate as a member of the Saeima.

Golubeva was the 2025-2026 the Henrik Enderlein fellow at Hertie School in Berlin.

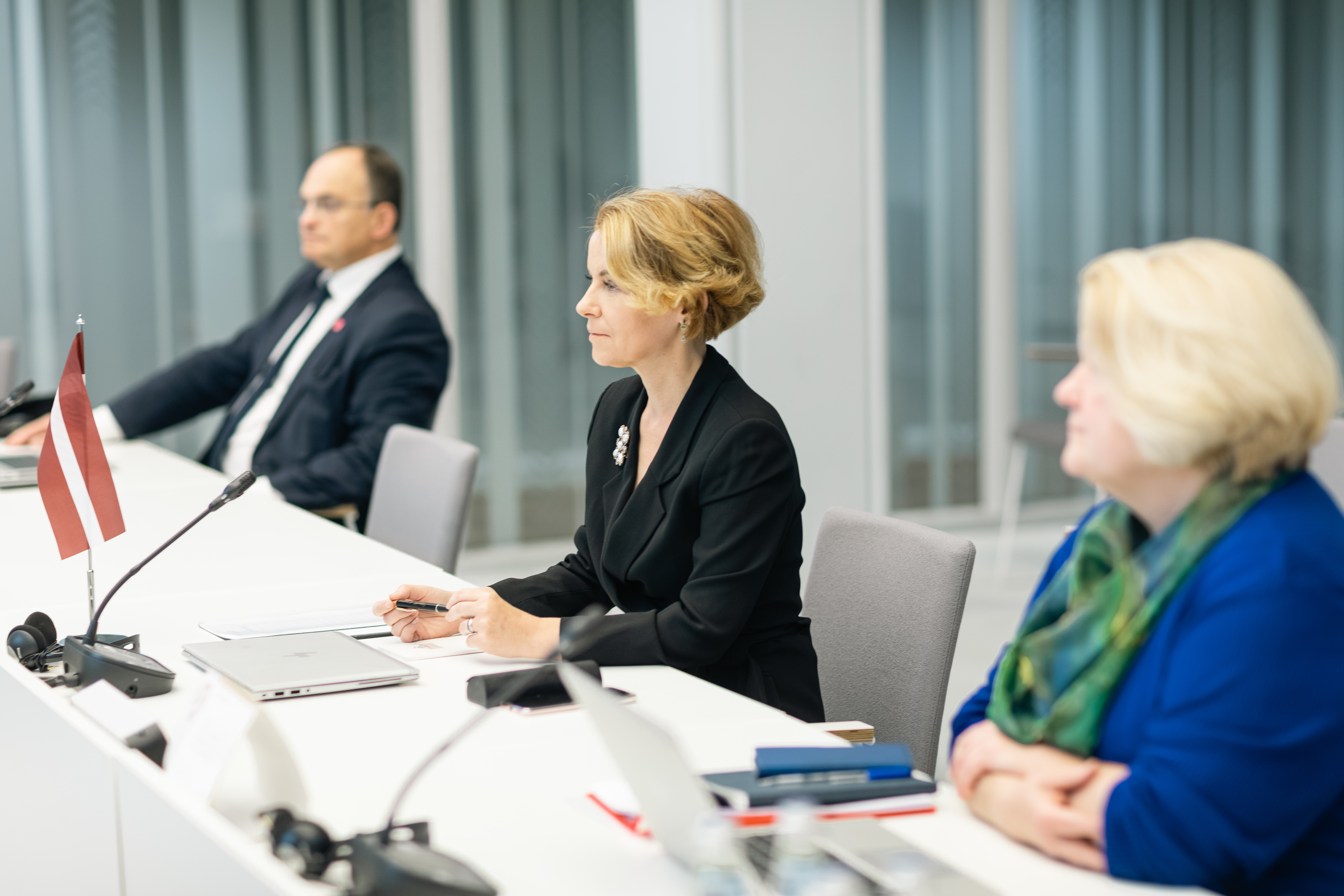
Marija Golubeva chairing a meeting of European Affairs Committee

Golubeva is considered Latvia's first openly lesbian minister, considered the second openly LGBT member of the Saeima in Latvian history, after Edgars Rinkēvičs. She was also one of the record high number of women elected to the Saeima in that election.
