= Sanita Pavļuta-Deslandes =

Latvian civil servant and diplomat

Ambassador of Latvia to the United Nations
- Incumbent
- Assumed office 2023

Ambassador of Latvia to France
- In office 2010–2016

Ambassador of Latvia to the Netherlands
- In office 2008–2010

Personal details
- Born: 1972 (age 53–54)
- Party: People's Party
- Relatives: Daniels Pavļuts (brother)
- Education: Latvian Academy of Culture; Paris Institute of Political Studies
- Occupation: Diplomat, civil servant

Sanita Pavļuta-Deslandes (born 1972) is a Latvian civil servant and diplomat, former ambassador to the Netherlands and France. Since 2023, she serves as ambassador of Latvia to the United Nations.

== Career ==
In 1995, she graduated from the Latvian Academy of Culture, and afterwards from the Paris Institute of Political Studies in 1998. Since 1995, she has worked at the Latvian Ministry of Foreign Affairs, serving as advisor to Prime Minister Aigars Kalvītis on European Union affairs (2005–2007). She was also an advisor at the Ministry of Education and Science (2006). In the 2006 parliamentary election, she unsuccessfully ran for a seat in parliament on the People's Party list.

From 2008 to 2010, she served as ambassador to the Netherlands, and in 2010 she was appointed ambassador to France and to the International Organization of La Francophonie. She served in this capacity until 2016.

In 2023, she became Latvia's ambassador to the United Nations.

== Personal life ==
She is the sister of Daniels Pavļuts.
