= Kaspars Briškens =

Latvian politician, economist, and diplomat

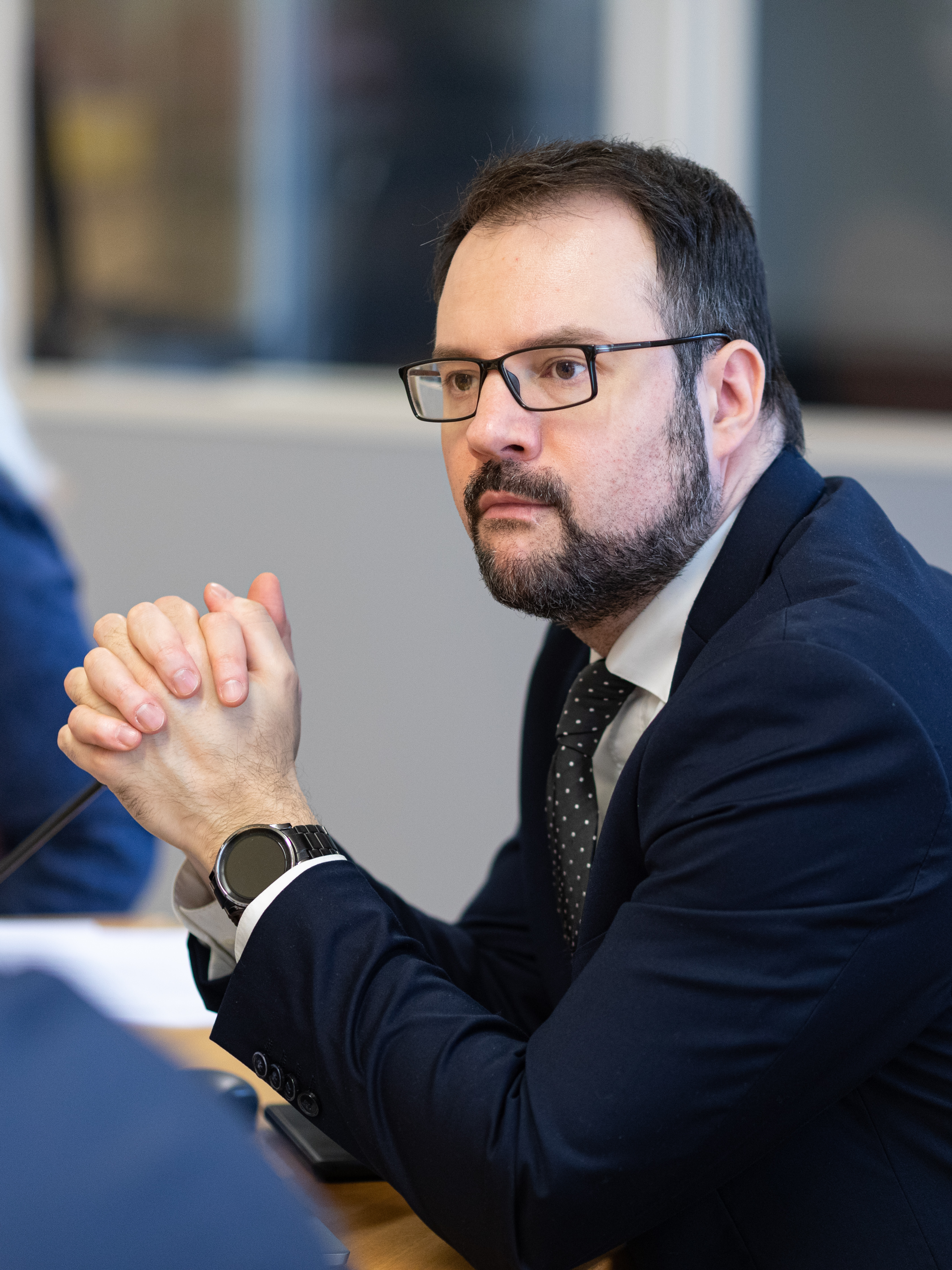
- Briškens in 2023

Minister for Transport
- In office 15 September 2023 – 26 February 2025
- Prime Minister: Evika Siliņa
- Preceded by: Jānis Vitenbergs
- Succeeded by: Atis Švinka

Personal details
- Born: 12 November 1982 (age 43) Riga, Latvian Soviet Socialist Republic, USSR (now Latvia)
- Party: Movement For! (2017–2021); The Progressives (since 2021)
- Education: Riga State Gymnasium No.1, Stockholm School of Economics in Riga, Stockholm University
- Occupation: Politician, economist, diplomat

Kaspars Briškens (born 12 November 1982) is a Latvian politician, economist, and a former diplomat. In the 2022 parliamentary election, Kaspars Briškens was a candidate for the post of prime minister of the Progressives party.

== Biography ==
He graduated from the International Baccalaureate program of the Riga State Gymnasium No.1. In 2005, he obtained a bachelor's degree in economics and business management at the Stockholm School of Economics in Riga. In 2011, he obtained a scientific master's degree in economics at Stockholm University.

In 2005, he started working at the Ministry of Foreign Affairs as a senior reporter. From 2007 to 2011, he was an economic and political diplomat, working at the Embassy of Latvia in Sweden. In 2011, he became the deputy head of the Foreign Trade and Investment Department of the Ministry of Foreign Affairs, leaving the position after two months in favor of working in the Ministry of Transport as a ministerial advisor. During 4 years from 2011 to 2015, he held the position of both ministerial advisor and deputy state secretary in the Ministry of Transport. He was the political coordinator of the transport and logistics cooperation of the NATO Northern Distribution Network, representing the Ministry of Transport. From 2013 to 2014, he was the executive director of the Latvian Logistics Association.

From 2012 to 2020, held the position of deputy chairman of the board of the national airline AirBaltic. As a board member and deputy for three terms, he has worked on company restructuring, development, ordering Airbus A220-300 model aircraft, attracting private investors and developing the company's business plan Destination 2025.

In 2014, he started working for RB Rail (Rail Baltica), initially as a member of the board, later holding the position of head of strategy and development. From 2021, he is a member of the board of the Pasažieru vilciens company.

Since 2019, Kaspars is also the annual good governance lecturer in the training programs of the Baltic Institute of Corporate Governance.

== Rail Baltica ==
Briškens has been involved in the Rail Baltica project since 2006, when he worked in the diplomatic service in Sweden. He was also an advisor to two transport ministers. In the company RB Rail, in the position of head of strategy and development, he managed the development, commercialization and digitalization of the project. In the project, he ensured the inclusion of Riga International Airport in the Rail Baltica railway route.

== Political activity ==
He was a co-founder of Movement For!, elected to the first council of the party. After leaving Movement For!, joined the non-partisan expert group "PRO Platform". For the 2022 parliamentary election, the "Progressives" party nominated Briškens as its candidate for the post of prime minister.
