= Diena =

Latvian newspaper

- Type: Daily newspaper
- Format: Compact
- Owner: Edgars Kots
- Publisher: Dienas mediji, Ltd
- Editor-in-chief: Gatis Madžiņš
- Founded: 23 November 1990
- Language: Latvian
- Headquarters: Riga, Latvia
- Circulation: 17,500 (2024)
- Website: www.diena.lv

Diena (The Day) is a Latvian language national daily newspaper in Latvia, published since 23 November 1990. It is one of Latvia's largest daily periodicals and used to be considered as a paper of record.

== History ==
The newspaper was initially founded as the official paper of the Supreme Council of the Republic of Latvia. Since privatisation in 1993, Diena was owned by Swedish media group Bonnier. Diena had 18,277 subscribers in December 2009, down from 26,866 in February 2009, and 41,471 in April 2000. It shifted from berliner to compact format in 2007. The newspaper's Russian language edition was discontinued in 1999.

== Controversies ==
In 2002, the publisher was fined for articles published in 1998 and criticizing then-minister for economy Laimonis Strujevičs. In 2007, the European Court of Human Rights held the fine to be in violation of freedom of expression.

In 2009, AS Diena together with its sister business daily Dienas Bizness was sold to an ambiguous investor group owned by Jonathan and David Rowland. On 6 August 2010, the Latvian businessman Viesturs Koziols acquired a 51% stake in the joint-stock company Diena. However, an investigation by the Latvian Corruption Prevention and Combating Bureau into the "Oligarchs Case" determined in 2011 that the paper in reality was owned by three Latvian oligarchs: Andris Šķēle, Aivars Lembergs and Ainārs Šlesers through the AS Rīgas tirdzniecības osta (JSC Riga Commercial Port, RTO – renamed AS Riga Port in 2022) company. This was further confirmed with the release of the notorious "Rīdzene Tapes" in 2017, in which the oligarchs are heard discussing their takeover of the paper. RTO ultimately sold the paper in 2015.

Following the change of ownership, many of the newspaper's staff resigned in October 2009. They started the online paper Cita Diena, which was transformed into the weekly newspaper Ir in 2010.

== Leadership ==
After long-time chief editor Sarmīte Ēlerte left the paper in 2008, it experienced a frequent change of leadership from 2009 to 2013. These included editors Ilmārs Znotiņš, Juris Bojārs and sociologist Aigars Freimanis. On May 10, 2013, Gatis Madžiņš became the incumbent chief editor of the newspaper.

The owner of the paper since 2015 is former Latvijas Televīzija head Edgars Kots.
