= Latvian Ice Hockey Federation =

Sports governing body in Latvia

Latvia
- Association name: Latvian Ice Hockey Federation
- IIHF Code: LAT
- IIHF membership: 22 February 1931
- Association history: Latvia 1931–1946; Soviet Union 1946–1992; Latvia 1992–present
- President: Aigars Kalvītis
- IIHF men's ranking: 10 (▼1) (26 May 2025)
- IIHF women's ranking: 23 (▲ +3) (21 April 2025)

The Latvian Ice Hockey Federation (Latvian: Latvijas Hokeja federācija), commonly abbreviated as LHF is the governing body that oversees ice hockey in Latvia, including the Latvian Hockey Higher League, the Latvia women's national ice hockey team and the Latvia men's national ice hockey team. It was founded in 1931 and was admitted to the IIHF the same year.

== History ==
The predecessor of the LHF, the Latvian Winter Sport Union (Latvijas Ziemas sporta savienība, LZSS) was founded in 1926. Until 1931, it focused on the promotion of bandy instead of ice hockey. After the start of the Soviet occupation of Latvia in 1940, the LZSS was dissolved by Soviet authorities, while it was suspended from the IIHF only in 1946.

After the restoration of the independence of Latvia, the Latvian Hockey Federation was established in 1991 and re-admitted to the IIHF during its congress in Prague on May 6, 1992. However, the Latvian national men's team was not restored back to the top division and had to play in Group C in its first World Championships since 1939. The team returned to the top flight in 1997. The women's national team played its first game in 1992.

== Presidents of the LHF ==
- Vilnis Burtnieks (1992–1994)
- Kirovs Lipmans (1994–1995, 1998–2016)
- Uģis Magonis (1995–1998)
- Aigars Kalvītis (2016–present)
