= Sarmīte Ēlerte =

Latvian politician (born 1957)

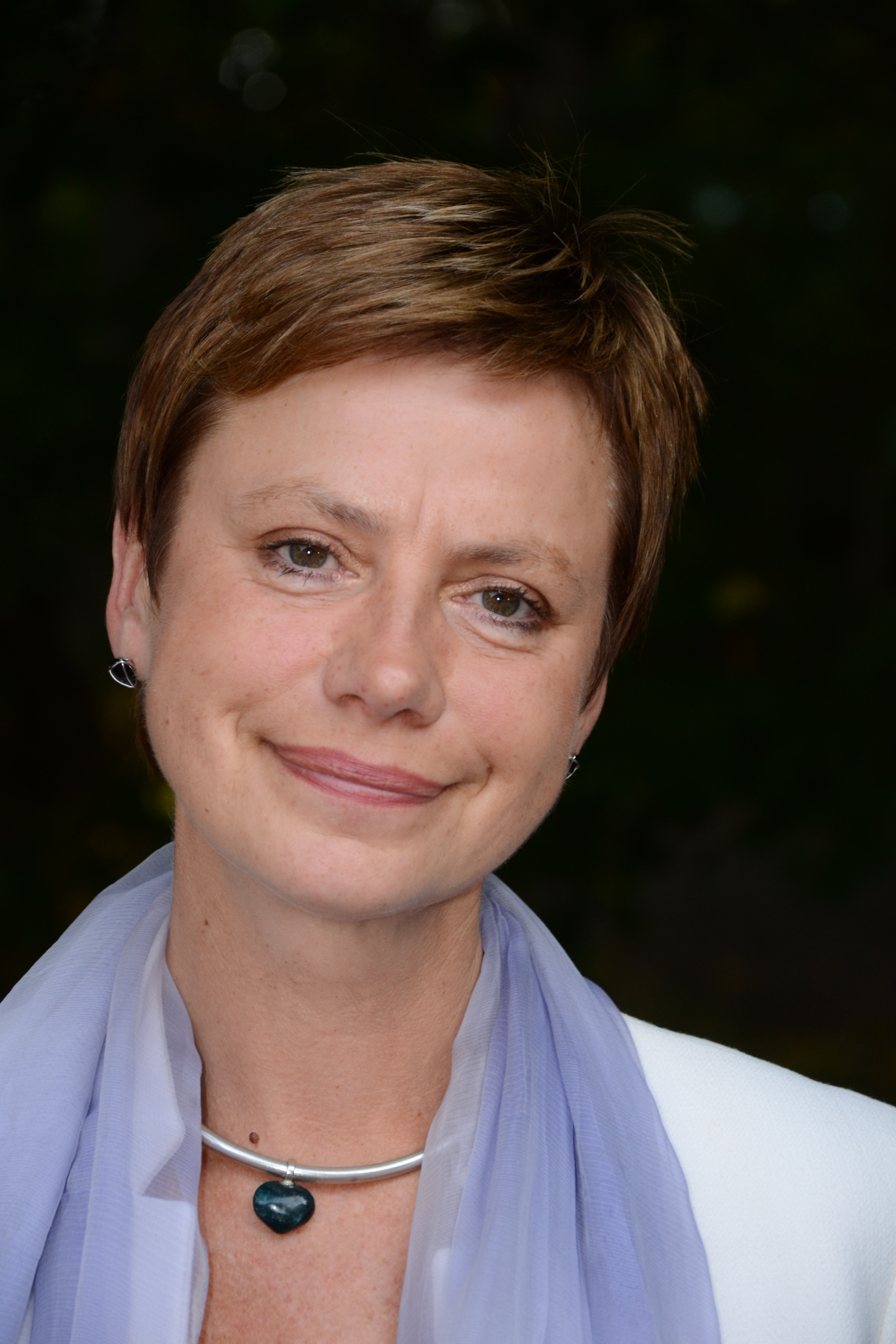
- Ēlerte in 2010

Minister of Culture of Latvia
- In office 3 November 2010 – 25 October 2011
- Prime Minister: Valdis Dombrovskis
- Preceded by: Ints Dālderis
- Succeeded by: Žaneta Jaunzeme-Grende

Personal details
- Born: 8 April 1957 (age 69) Riga, Latvian SSR
- Party: Unity
- Other political affiliations: Communist Party of Latvia; Popular Front of Latvia
- Education: University of Latvia
- Profession: Journalist

Sarmīte Ēlerte (born 8 April 1957) is a Latvian politician who is a member of the Unity party. She was Minister of Culture of Latvia from 3 November 2010 until 25 October 2011.

== Early life ==
Ēlerte was born on 8 April 1957, in Riga, Latvian SSR. She graduated from the Faculty of Journalism of the University of Latvia in 1980. In 1983-1988 she studied film critics at the All-Union State Institute of Cinematography in Moscow. From 1978 to 1988 she worked as a journalist for the magazine "Literatūra un Māksla".

== Political career ==
In 1988 she joined the Popular Front of Latvia where she organized the information department. After the victory of the Front in the 1990 election she was the director of the Information Centre of the Supreme Council of the Republic of Latvia. She served this function until 1991. In 1990 she was appointed chief of the newly created "Diena" newspaper and two years later she became the newspaper's head editor. She held this position until 2008. She was a head of the Latvian branch of the Soros Foundation in 1997–2006. In 2007 Ēlerte became a founding member of the European Council on Foreign Relations, which included, among others Mart Laar, Martti Ahtisaari, Joschka Fischer and George Soros. She is a head of the Baltic to Black Sea Alliance. Until 2009 she is a chair of National Council for Culture.

In 2007, along with Sandra Kalniete she was the initiator of the so-called Umbrella revolution (Lietussargu Revolucija) directed against the oligarchy and the ruling class. In 2010 she was engaged in a process of consolidation of the Latvian center-right forces. In March 2010, she founded the Association for Progressive Change them. Zigfrīds Anna Meierovics.

In the elections of 2010 she established the electoral platform of "Unity" in Semigallia from which she was elected to the Saeima (Latvian Parliament). On November 3, 2010, she was appointed as the minister of culture in the second government of Valdis Dombrovskis. She held this position until October 25, 2011. She lost in the 2011 election to the Saeima.

She was advisor to Prime Minister Valdis Dombrovskis. On November 26, 2012, she was nominated a candidate for the office of mayor of Riga by the Unity party.
