= Ir (newspaper) =

Latvian newspaper

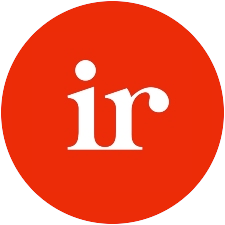
- Type: Weekly newspaper
- Format: Compact
- Publisher: AS „Cits medijs”
- Founded: April 7, 2010
- Language: Latvian
- Headquarters: Riga, Latvia
- Circulation: 15,000
- Website: ir.lv

Ir is an independent Latvian weekly newspaper. It was cofounded in 2010 by the former staff of Diena, after the ownership structure behind that newspaper became unverifiable.

As of 2020, it had a circulation of 15,000 copies. It claims to reach a total audience of over 70,000 people.

== History ==
"Ir" was founded to continue the tradition of independent journalism at Diena. Immediately after the restoration of Latvian independence, Diena was called in the New York Times "the most adamantly independent major new daily among the nations of post-Soviet Europe". It was the leading independent daily in Latvia until its sale by the Swedish Bonnier Group, to unknown owners, during the late 2000s economic downturn in Latvia. This was a clear threat to independent journalism. It caused journalists and editorial staff to leave and found "Ir" as a new independent initiative.

== Editor in chief ==
Ir's editor-in-chief is Nellija Ločmele, a former Diena journalist.

== Ethics, ownership and structure ==
In order to guarantee journalistic independence, AS „Cits medijs”, the legal owner behind Ir, is governed by strict rules regarding shareholding and ethics. No more than 25% of the newspaper can belong to one party.

AS „Cits medijs” is partly owned by the journalists themselves. Other notable shareholders include Ints Siliņš, former US ambassador to Latvia. Cofounder and president of the board is Pauls Raudseps, a Latvian-American who co-founded Diena in 1990.

Further information about the company AS „Cits medijs” can be found using its EU company registration number.
