= Andrejs Judins =

Latvian politician

- Judins in the Saeima in 2018
- Born: Andrejs Judins; February 21, 1970 (age 56); Riga, Latvian SSR
- Education: University of Latvia (Law, 1993); Latvian Police Academy (PhD in criminal law, 1997)
- Occupations: lawyer, politician
- Political party: SCP (2011); Unity (2011–2017); Movement For! (2017–2018); Unity (2018–present)
- Website: https://judins.lv/

Andrejs Judins (born 21 February 1970) is a Latvian lawyer, academic, and politician who has served as a member of the Saeima since 2011. He is a member of the Unity political party, within the centre-right New Unity alliance.

== Life ==
Judins was born on 21 February 1970 in Riga, Latvia. His native language is Russian, and he is fluent in Latvian and English as second languages. He attended the Jurmala Secondary School no.2 (now Kauguri High School). At the University of Latvia, Judins studied law, graduating in 1993. He then attended the Latvian Police Academy, receiving a PhD in the field of criminal law in 1997.

Between 1991 and 2005, Judins worked as a civil science teacher at Jurmala Secondary School no.2. He has also worked with the Investigation Department of the Ministry of the Interior and the Latvian Police Academy until 2009, was a researcher in criminal justice at Providus (a non-governmental think tank), and worked in the State Probation Service. Since 2007, Judins has also contributed as an external legal researcher to the European Commission on legal freedom, justice, and security. He has also delivered judicial training lectures at the Supreme Court and the Latvian Judicial Training Centre.

In 2010, Judins applied for a position on the Supreme Court of Latvia, following years of co-operation in case-law, and was supported by the Legal Commission. The Chief Justice of the Supreme Court, and Chair of the Department of Criminal Cases of the Senate, both indicated their support. However, the Saeima did not approve his candidacy, with forty legislators voting for his candidacy, twenty-seven voting against, and twenty-two abstaining.

== Political career (2011-present) ==
In 2011, Judins joined the social-liberal Society for Political Change political party, and was successfully elected to the Saeima. He subsequently ran as a candidate for the Unity party in the 2014 European Parliament election, as the ninth candidate on the electoral party list, however was unsuccessful. He also ran unsuccessfully in the 2019 and 2024 European elections. He has been re-elected to the Saeima three times, most recently in 2022.

Judins left Unity to form Movement For! in 2017 over disagreements with the Unity party's strategic direction and activities.

Judins was the initiator of a parliamentary commission of inquiry into the Rīdzene talks, which involved talks between oligarchs such as Aivars Lembergs, Ainārs Šlesers, and Andris Šķēle, and influential politicians such as Jānis Dūklavs, Mārtiņš Bondars, Jānis Urbanovičs. Inguna Sudraba was chosen as the leader of the commission report; her involvement was criticised, as she was also mentioned in the published records. Following the final report's release in January 2018, Judins added his dissenting thoughts onto the report in protest at its results.
