= Uldis Augulis =

Latvian politician

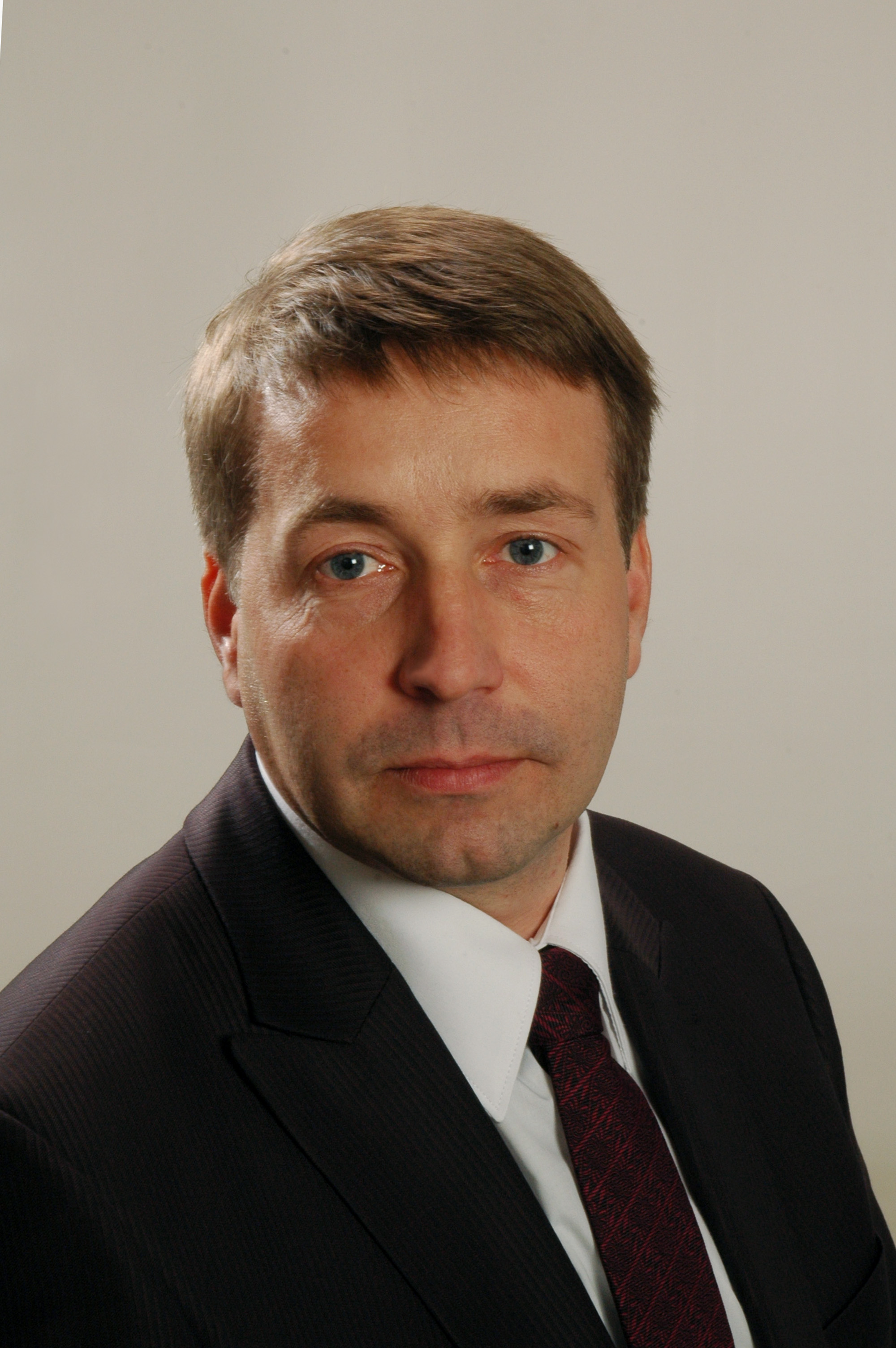
- Official portrait, 2010

Minister of Welfare
- In office 15 September 2023 – 26 February 2025
- Prime Minister: Evika Siliņa
- Preceded by: Evika Siliņa
- Succeeded by: Reinis Uzulnieks

Minister for Transport of Latvia
- In office 3 November 2010 – 25 October 2011
- Prime Minister: Valdis Dombrovskis
- Preceded by: Kaspars Gerhards
- Succeeded by: Aivis Ronis

Member of the Saeima
- Incumbent
- Assumed office 6 November 2018
- In office 17 October 2011 – 23 January 2014

Personal details
- Born: 16 March 1972 (age 54) Dobele, Latvian SSR, Soviet Union
- Party: Union of Greens and Farmers
- Education: University of Latvia

Uldis Augulis (born 16 March 1972) is a Latvian politician and a member of the Union of Greens and Farmers. He holds a bachelor's degree in financial management from the University of Latvia. He was the former Welfare Minister from 2009 to 2010 and again between 2014 and 2016, and also again 2023 to 2025. He was also the former Minister of Transport from 2010 to 2011 and again between 2016 and 2019. He was also the acting Minister of Justice from March to April 2010. Augulis was elected to the Saeima on October 2, 2011.

== Controversy ==
Augulis caused controversy with his prioritisation of road and rail links between Riga and Moscow while delaying regional EU projects such as Rail Baltica, citing a lack of funds.

Latvia has already lost EUR 12.2 million (LVL 8.54 million) of EU funds due to hesitation over the Rail Baltica project, and the EU Transport Commissioner has stated there is no chance that the EU will contribute funds to the proposed Moscow link despite Augulis' assertion that the EU could contribute up to 85%.

The high-speed railroad project between Riga and Moscow is economically justified due to increasing passenger and cargo turnover, and it is not political, Russian Transport Minister Igor Levitin said after a meeting with Augulis.
