= Aleksejs Loskutovs =

Latvian politician

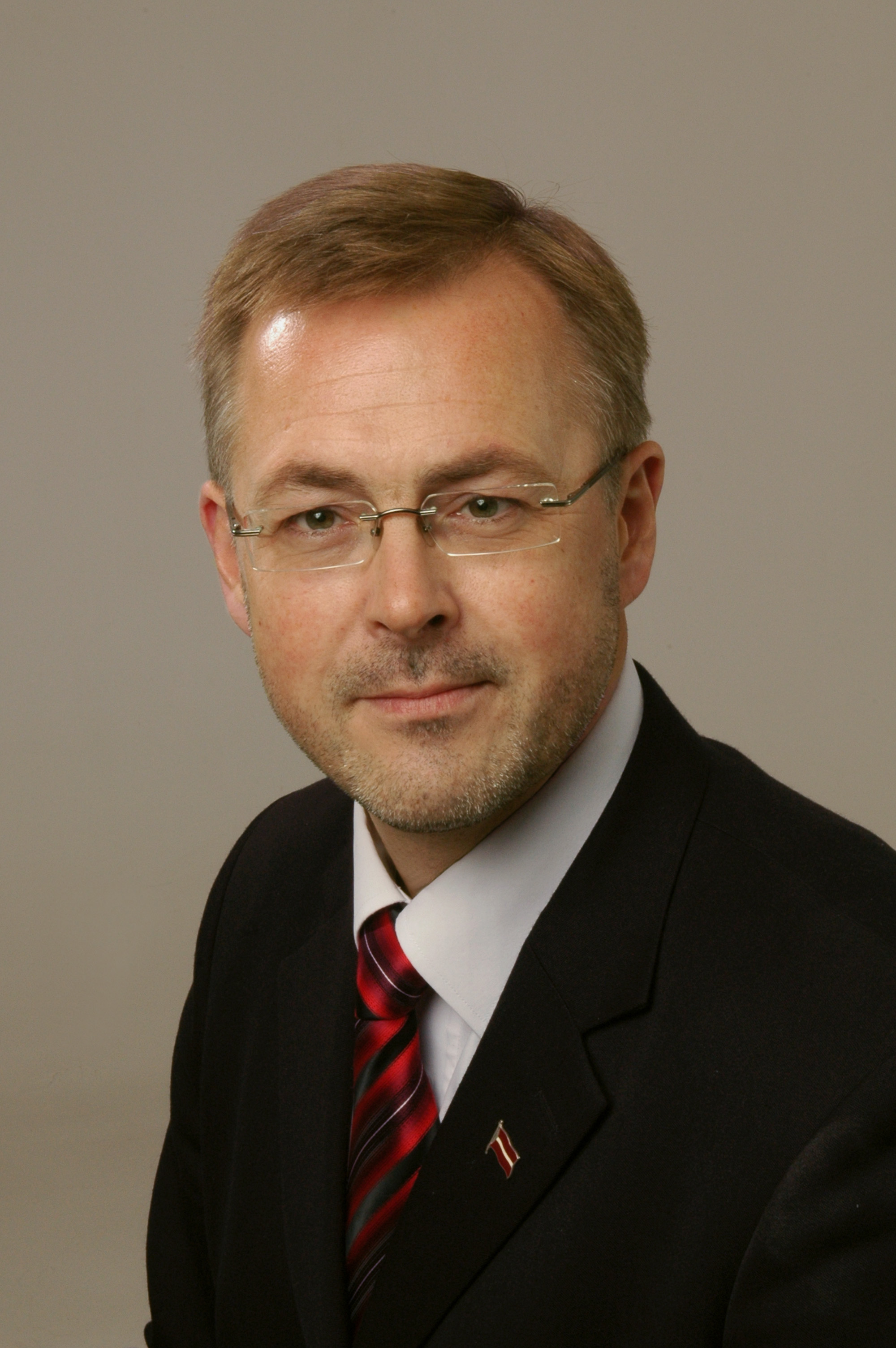

Member of the European Parliament
- In office 24 January 2014 – 1 July 2019
- Preceded by: Arturs Krišjānis Kariņš

Personal details
- Born: August 22, 1962 (age 63) Riga, Latvian SSR, Soviet Union (now Latvia)
- Party: SCP (2009-2011); Unity (2011-2017); For! (2017-2018); Unity (since 2018)
- Profession: Politician

Aleksejs Loskutovs (born August 22, 1962) is a Latvian politician. He served as a Member of the European Parliament for Unity from January 24, 2019, until July 1, 2019.

== Biography ==
Aleksejs Loskutovs attended secondary school in Riga. In 1984, he graduated with a law degree from the University of Latvia and later obtained a doctorate in 1993. He also studied at the University of Helsinki.

In 1984, he joined the Prosecutor's Office in Riga and also worked at the Ministry of the Interior of the Latvian SSR.

From 1993 to 1997, he worked as the chief criminologist at the Latvian Centre for Criminology Research, and from 1991 to 2003, he served as an assistant and professor at the Latvian Police Academy.

In 2003, he became a professor at the University of Daugavpils.

In 2008, as part of a protest against his dismissal, he became involved in politics with the Society for Political Change, which later joined a right-wing coalition. Aleksejs Loskutovs was elected as a member of the Saeima for the 10th, 11th, and 12th legislatures. He ran for the European Parliament in the 2014 elections but was not successful.

In 2017, he joined the Movement For! before leaving it the following year.

During the 2018 Latvian parliamentary elections, he ran on the Unity party list but was not elected. He entered the European Parliament in January 2019 following the resignation of Arturs Krišjānis Kariņš.

== See also ==
- List of members of the European Parliament for Latvia, 2014–2019
- List of members of the European Parliament (2014–2019)
