= Ints Dālderis =

Latvian politician

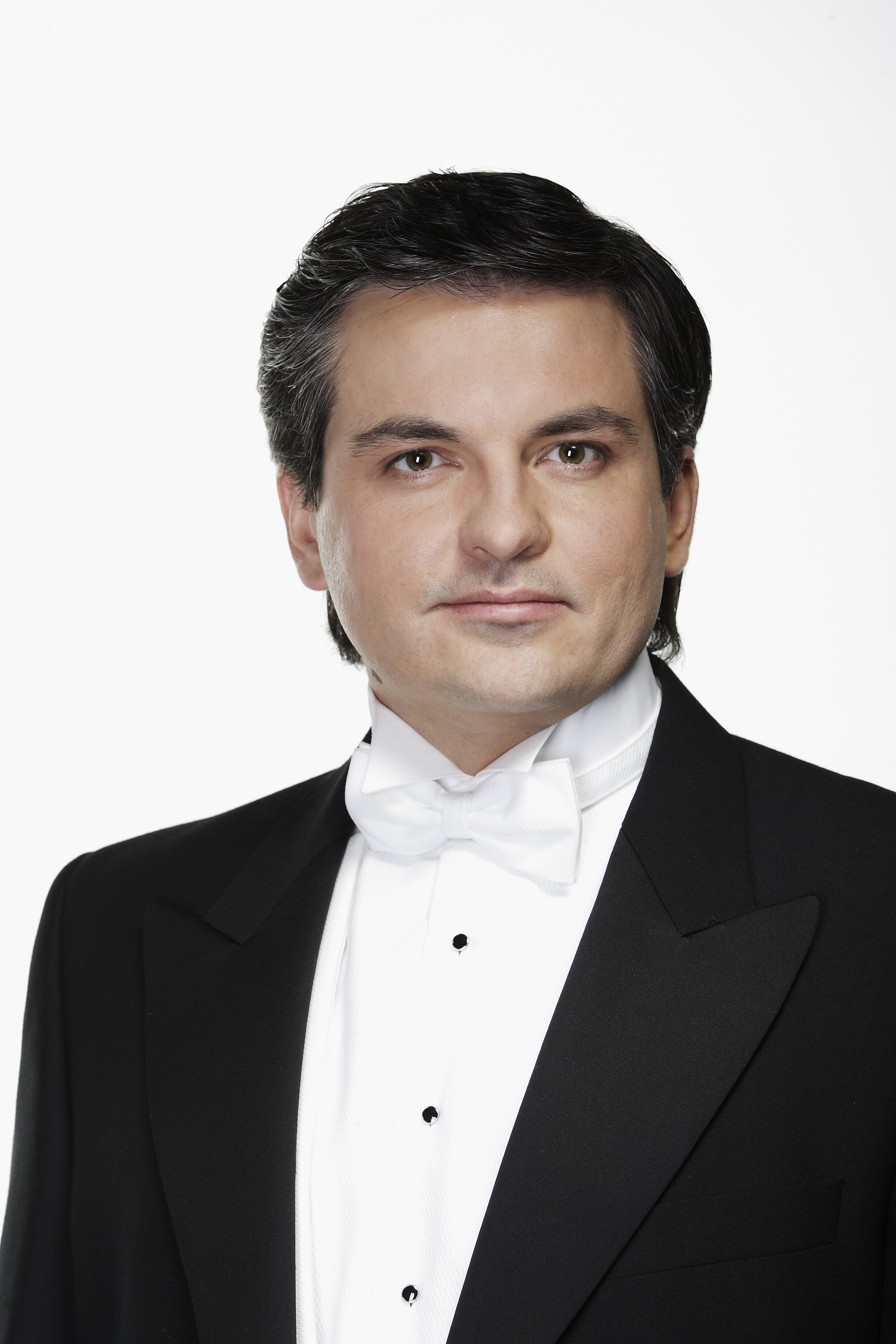
- Dālderis in 2008

Minister of Culture of Latvia
- In office 12 March 2009 – 3 November 2010
- Prime Minister: Valdis Dombrovskis
- Preceded by: Helēna Demakova
- Succeeded by: Sarmīte Ēlerte

Personal details
- Born: 10 February 1971 (age 55) Jūrmala, Latvian SSR
- Party: Unity
- Other political affiliations: Movement For! New Era Party; People's Party
- Education: J. Vītols Latvian Academy of Music
- Profession: clarinetist, politician

Ints Dālderis (born 10 February 1971, Jūrmala, Latvian SSR) is a Latvian clarinetist and politician of initially the People's Party, then New Era Party, then Unity and finally Movement For!. He was Minister of Culture of Latvia from March 12, 2009, to November 3, 2010.
