= Daniels Pavļuts =

Latvian politician

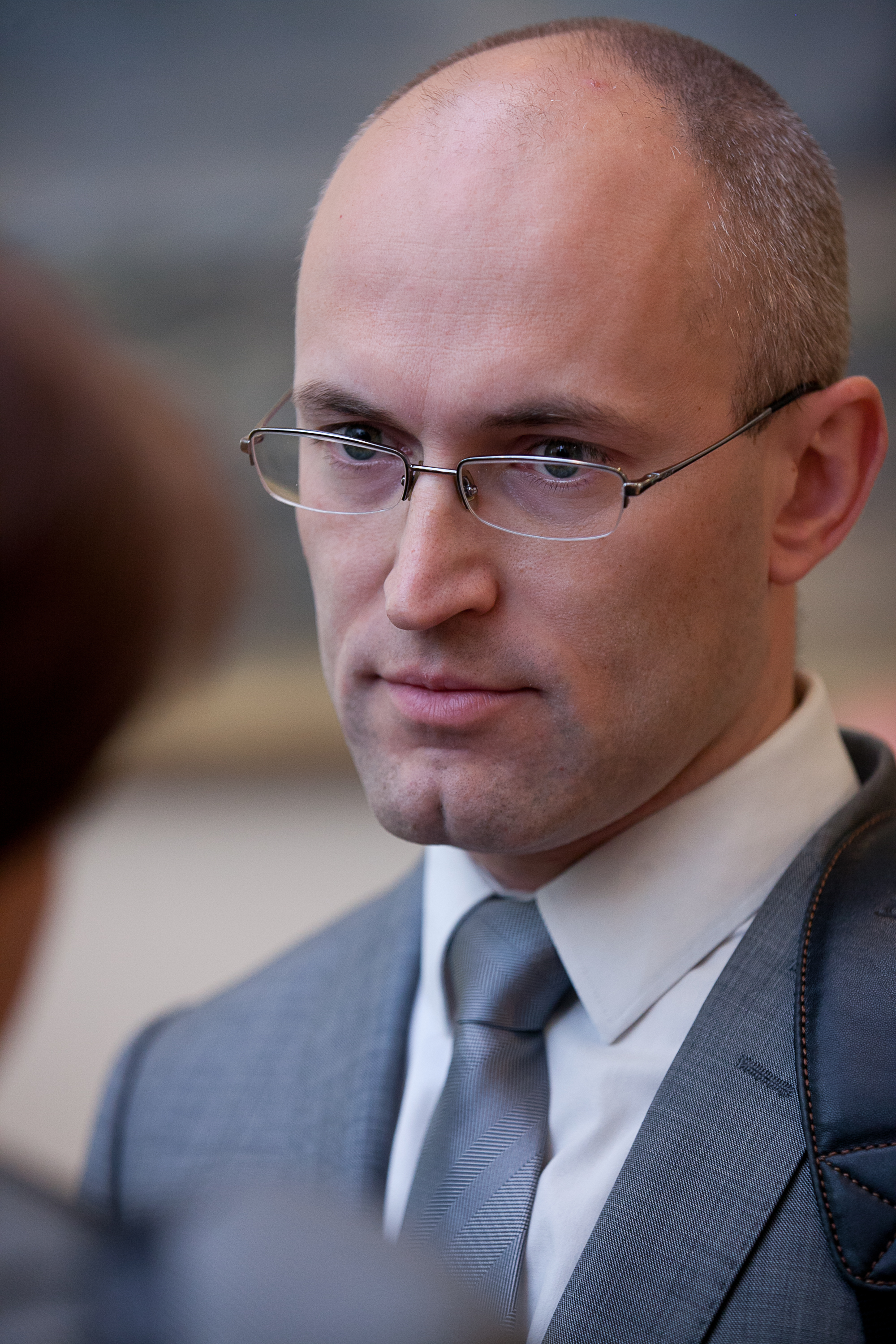

Minister for Health of Latvia
- In office 7 January 2021 – 14 December 2022
- Prime Minister: Arturs Krišjānis Kariņš
- Preceded by: Ilze Viņķele
- Succeeded by: Līga Meņģelsone

Minister for Economics of Latvia
- In office 25 October 2011 – 22 January 2014
- Prime Minister: Valdis Dombrovskis
- Preceded by: Artis Kampars
- Succeeded by: Vjačeslavs Dombrovskis

Personal details
- Born: 14 May 1976 (age 50) Jūrmala, Latvian SSR, Soviet Union
- Education: Latvian Academy of Music; Harvard University

Daniels Pavļuts (born 14 May 1976) is a Latvian politician and former Minister for Health of Latvia from January 2021 to December 2022. He was formerly the Minister for Economics of Latvia, a position he served in from 2011 until 2014. In addition to his political and business career, he is a concert pianist.

== Career ==
Prior to a career in politics, Pavļuts served as the head of corporate affairs at Swedbank AS in Riga, brand director for DDB Latvia, a member of the board at the Latvian Chamber of Commerce and Industry, and a board member at ZENO Consulting.

From 2003 to 2006, Pavļuts held the office of State Secretary at the Ministry of Culture of Latvia. In 2001, he worked as an adviser to the Director of Management and Communication at the Latvian National Opera.

=== Minister of Health ===
On January 7, 2021, Pavļuts was elected new Minister for Health of Latvia, after the sitting minister, Ilze Viņķele had stepped down at Prime Minister Krišjānis Kariņš's request. During his tenure, he oversaw Latvia's response to the COVID-19 pandemic. Although he was originally opposed to mandatory vaccination measures, in November 2021 Saeima passed a law allowing employers to dismiss employees who do not have a valid vaccination against or recovery from COVID-19.

On 16 September 2021, Pavļuts survived a vote of no confidence measure 50-34. Hours after announcing the possibility of an emergency mobilisation of the Latvian medical field on 26 October, the Latvian Medical Association called for his resignation due to a perceived lack of communication and "unprofessional approach". Pavļuts did not resign, but promised better cooperation with the medical field and clarified that emergency mobilisation was not currently imminent.

== Education ==
Pavļuts earned a Bachelor of Arts from Jāzeps Vītols Latvian Academy of Music in 1999, a post-graduate diploma in Cultural Management from City University London in 2000, and a Master of Public Administration from the John F. Kennedy School of Government at Harvard University in 2007.

He speaks Latvian, Russian, English, French, and German.

=== Personal life ===
Pavļuts was married to Linda Pavļuta from 2006 until 2018, with whom he has two sons. In 2021 he married Elīna Grīnhofa, with whom he has twins. In addition to his political and business career, Pavļuts is known as a concert pianist.
