= List of ministers for foreign affairs of Latvia =

The foreign minister of the Republic of Latvia is the head of the Ministry of Foreign Affairs and is charged with being the architect Latvian foreign policy and carrying out diplomatic orders by the president of Latvia. The position was first created in 1918 after Latvian independence, and re-established in May 1990 following the restoration of the country's independence from the USSR. From October 2011 until July 2023, the position was held by Edgars Rinkēvičs.

== List of ministers ==
Name	Portrait	Term of office		Political party
Jānis Jurkāns		22 May 1990	10 November 1992	Popular Front of Latvia
Georgs Andrejevs		10 November 1992	7 June 1994	Latvian Way
Valdis Birkavs		19 September 1994	16 July 1999	Latvian Way
Indulis Bērziņš		16 July 1999	7 November 2002	Latvian Way
Sandra Kalniete		7 November 2002	9 March 2004	Independent
Rihards Pīks		9 March 2004	19 July 2004	People's Party
Artis Pabriks		21 July 2004	28 October 2007	People's Party
Māris Riekstiņš		8 November 2007	17 March 2010	People's Party
Aivis Ronis		29 April 2010	3 November 2010	Independent
Ģirts Valdis Kristovskis		3 November 2010	25 October 2011	Unity
Edgars Rinkēvičs		25 October 2011	8 July 2023	Reform Party
Edgars Rinkēvičs		25 October 2011	8 July 2023	Unity
Krišjānis Kariņš		8 July 2023	10 April 2024	Unity
Baiba Braže		19 April 2024	Incumbent	Unity

== See also ==
- Ministry of Foreign Affairs (Latvia)
