= Xcho =

Russian-Armenian singer (born 2001)

Background information
- Born: Khachik Araikovich Dunamalyan; 9 June 2001 (age 25); Vanadzor, Armenia
- Genres: Hip hop; rap
- Occupations: Singer; songwriter; rapper
- Years active: 2019–present

Khachik Araikovich Dunamalyan (Russian: Хачик Араикович Дунамалян; Armenian: Խաչիկ Արայիկի Դունամալյան; born 9 June 2001), better known by his stage name Xcho (stylized as «Хчо»), is an Armenian-born singer, song writer and hip-hop. He performs in both Russian and Armenian.

== Biography ==
Khachik Dunamalyan was born on 9 June 2001 in Vanadzor, Lori Province, Armenia.

In 2024, Minister of Foreign Affairs of Latvia Baiba Braže added Xcho to the list of undesirable persons for the Republic of Latvia. He is currently banned from entering Latvia.

== Discography ==
- CROSS (2020)
- Immigrant (2022)
- Thriller (Триллер) (2025)
- LTM (2026)
