= ENRS =

ENRS may refer to:

- European Network Remembrance and Solidarity, a joint initiative by German, Hungarian, Polish, and Slovak ministers of culture created in 2005
- Entreprise nationale de Radiodiffusion sonore, an Algerian broadcasting company
- Røst Airport, ICAO airport code
