= Baiba Braže =

Latvian diplomat and politician

Her Excellency Baiba Braže GOIH
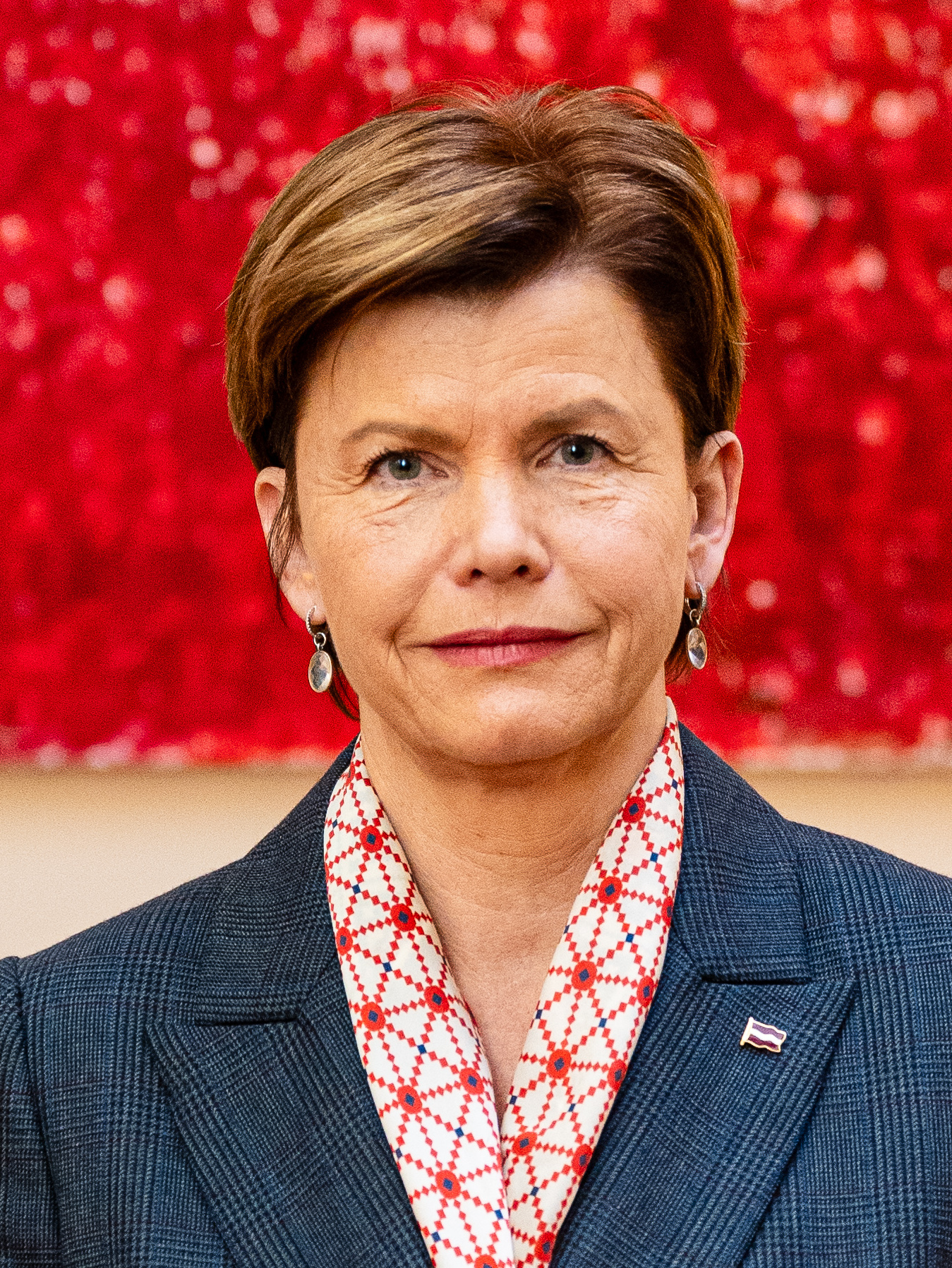
- Official portrait, 2024

Minister of Foreign Affairs
- In office 19 April 2024 – 17 November 2026
- Prime Minister: Evika Siliņa; Andris Kulbergs
- Preceded by: Krišjānis Kariņš
- Succeeded by: Ģirts Jaunzems

NATO Assistant Secretary General for Public Diplomacy
- In office May 2020 – June 2023
- Deputy: Carmen Romero
- Secretary General: Jens Stoltenberg
- Preceded by: Tacan Ildem
- Succeeded by: Marie-Doha Besancenot
Ambassador positions 1996–2020
Ambassador of Latvia to the United Kingdom
In office 24 August 2016 – May 2020
Appointed by	Raimonds Vējonis
Monarch	Elizabeth II
Preceded by	Andris Teikmanis
Succeeded by	Ivita Burmistre
Ambassador of Latvia to Indonesia
Non-resident
In office 2015–2016
Ambassador of Latvia to the Netherlands
In office July 2003 – August 2008
Appointed by	Vaira Vīķe-Freiberga
Monarch	Queen Beatrix
Preceded by	Kārlis Eihenbaums
Succeeded by	Sanita Pavļuta-Deslandes
Permanent Representative of Latvia to the United Nations
In office 1996–1998

Personal details
- Born: 4 December 1966 (age 59) Riga, Latvian SSR, Soviet Union (now Riga, Latvia)
- Party: New Unity (since 2024)
- Spouse: Tjaco van den Hout
- Children: 1
- Education: University of Latvia; Chulalongkorn University; University of Groningen; Åbo Akademi University
- Occupation: Politician; diplomat

Baiba Braže (born 4 December 1966) is a Latvian politician and diplomat who has served as Minister of Foreign Affairs from 2024 to 2026. She previously served as the NATO Assistant Secretary General for Public Diplomacy from 2020 to 2023. A member of New Unity, (Note: Since 4 June 2024) Braže has held various positions in the Ministry of Foreign Affairs in her diplomatic career between 1993 and 2024.

Born in Riga, Braže studied at the University of Latvia where she earned a master's degree in law and another master's degree in communication science. She also studied in Salzburg in Austria, as well as at the University of Groningen in the Netherlands and the Åbo Akademi University in Finland. She began her career at the Ministry of Foreign Affairs in 1993 and served as the Permanent Representative of Latvia to the United Nations from 1996 to 1998. Braže then worked as a Foreign Affairs adviser to Prime Minister Vilis Krištopans and later served as the Ambassador of Latvia to the Netherlands from July 2003 to August 2008. After her husband became the Dutch ambassador to several Asian countries, Braže moved with her family to Asia and studied at the Chulalongkorn University whilst living there.

Braže returned to the Foreign Ministry in 2011 and worked as Directorate of Security Policy and International Organisations until 2016. In 2015, she became the non-resident Ambassador of Latvia to Indonesia, becoming the first ever Latvian Ambassador to the country. She also briefly worked as the Director General of the Communications Directorate from February to July 2016. In August 2016, she was appointed Ambassador of Latvia to the United Kingdom, shortly after the Brexit referendum. Braže left her position as Ambassador to the UK in order to become the NATO Assistant Secretary General for Public Diplomacy in May 2020, the highest ranking position any Latvian had ever held in the organisation. She served in the position until 2023, and then worked as an Ambassador at Large in the Foreign Ministry from 2023 to 2024.

In April 2024, following the resignation of Krišjānis Kariņš, Braže was appointed Minister of Foreign Affairs in the Siliņa cabinet. She became the second female Latvian foreign minister in history, since Sandra Kalniete who served in the position over 20 years prior. In June 2024, she joined New Unity, having not previously been a member of any political party during her entire diplomatic career.

== Early life and education ==
Braže was born on 4 December 1966 in Riga in Latvian Soviet Socialist Republic of the Soviet Union, although her parents are from the city of Liepāja. Braže spent many of her childhood summers in Bārta, where her grandparents lived. Braže stated that her grandfather, Fricis, had built his house there with his own hands and took care of it all his life, whilst her grandmother, Alvīne, was a singer in a Bārta ensemble and teacher at a school in Bārta. She started going to Bārta less often when she began training to become a javelin thrower and going to competitions. She trained with athlete Valentīna Eiduka, and continued to train for ten years until she stopped playing after an injury. She has attributed President Vaira Vīķe-Freiberga and conductor Mariss Jansons as inspirations to her.

On 23 August 1989, Braže along with her family, friends and fellow students, stood in the Baltic Way in protest against Soviet occupation. On the 30th anniversary of the event, she wrote in The Diplomat, where she described the atmosphere of the event as "electric" and said that they were "fearless and totally committed to their cause" as well as stating that they wanted to regain their "freedom and independence."

Braže began studying at the University of Latvia in 1985, where she earned a Master's degree from in law in 1990. She then studied political science at the University of Latvia from 1992 to 1993 and International Public Law at the University of Groningen in the Netherlands in 1993. In 1994, she studied Transnational Law and Legal Institutions in Salzburg and in 1995 she studied the International Protection of Human Rights at the Åbo Akademi University in Finland. She earned another Master's degree at the University of Latvia, studying Communication Science from 2000 to 2002.

In 2014, she was trained by the School of Public Administration and the European Institute of Public Administration in order to prepare for Latvia's presidency of the council of the EU. The same year, she took a Generals, Flag Officers and Ambassadors course at the NATO Defense College in Rome.

== Diplomatic career (1993–2020) ==
=== Early career: 1993–2008 ===
Braže joined the Latvian Foreign Ministry in August 1993, working as a Senior Desk Officer from 1993 to 1994. She was then a Senior Desk Officer of the International Political Organisations Division in the Ministry of Foreign Affairs from 1994 to 1995, and then from 1995 to 1996 she was Head of the Human Rights Policy Division in the Ministry of Foreign Affairs. She subsequently served as the First Secretary of the Permanent Mission of Latvia to the United Nations in New York from 1996 to 1998.

Braže worked as a Counsellor of the Task Force for Preparation of EU Accession Negotiations in the Foreign Ministry, and as Foreign Affairs adviser to Prime Minister, Vilis Krištopans, from 1998 to 1999. She was then Director of the First Political Department from 1999 to 2003 in the Foreign Ministry. From July 2003 to August 2008, she served as the Latvian ambassador to the Netherlands and also the Permanent Representative to the Organization for the Prohibition of Chemical Weapons. She then served as an Ambassador at Large in the Third Political Directorate of the Foreign Ministry in 2008. After her husband became an Ambassador to various Asian countries, Braže left the Foreign Ministry and lived in Asia.

=== Return to the Foreign Ministry: 2011–2016 ===
Braže returned to the Foreign Ministry in 2011, working as Directorate of Security Policy and International Organisations until 2016. She then served as the Non-resident Ambassador Extraordinary and Plenipotentiary to the Republic of Indonesia from 2015 to 2016, residing in Riga and becoming the first Latvian Ambassador to the country. On 3 February 2016, President Joko Widodo presented credentials to Braže in a ceremony in Jakarta, where she thanked Widodo for his assessment of good relations between the countries and said that they were formed from political dialogue, growing economic relations and cooperation in international organisations. She also worked as the Director General of the Communications Directorate of the Ministry of Foreign Affairs from February to July 2016.

=== Ambassador to the UK: 2016–2020 ===
On 24 August 2016, Braže became the Latvian Ambassador to the United Kingdom. On 22 July 2016, President, Raimonds Vējonis, presented credentials to her. In September 2016, Braže hosted a lunch of a Nordic group of Ambassadors where the rise in hate crime following the Brexit referendum was discussed, with Braže stating that their citizens "have not experienced anything like this before the referendum" and that there was maybe "an atmosphere" that was "more permitting of unpleasant words and maybe actions." On 14 November 2016, Braže attended the official opening of the Honorary Consulate of Latvia in Glasgow, which was attended by External Affairs Secretary, Fiona Hyslop as David Kaye became the first Honorary Consul of Latvia in Glasgow for almost 60 years. On 17 November, she presented her letters of credence to Queen Elizabeth II in an audience at Buckingham Palace, which was attended by her husband.

In April 2017, Braže celebrated the 98th anniversary of the statehood of Latvia in London where she addressed guests and reminded them of the Latvian support for the UK at the end of World War I and said "we hope that will never be necessary again." The event was attended by various dignitaries including MP Mark Prisk, Ambassador Peter Ammon and Ambassador Arkady Rzegocki. In July, Braže travelled to Northern Ireland where she met with Latvian Honorary Consul to Northern Ireland, Gerard O'Hare, and in an interview she described Brexit as "big news" because "nobody expected it." On 4 December 2017, Braže launched Latvia's centenary celebrations in the United Kingdom alongside Secretary of State for Foreign and Commonwealth Affairs, Boris Johnson, by lighting a Christmas tree given by Latvia in Lancaster House. Whilst Johnson spoke about the relationship between Latvia and the UK, Braže highlighted the close historical ties and pointed to the well developed cooperation between the countries.

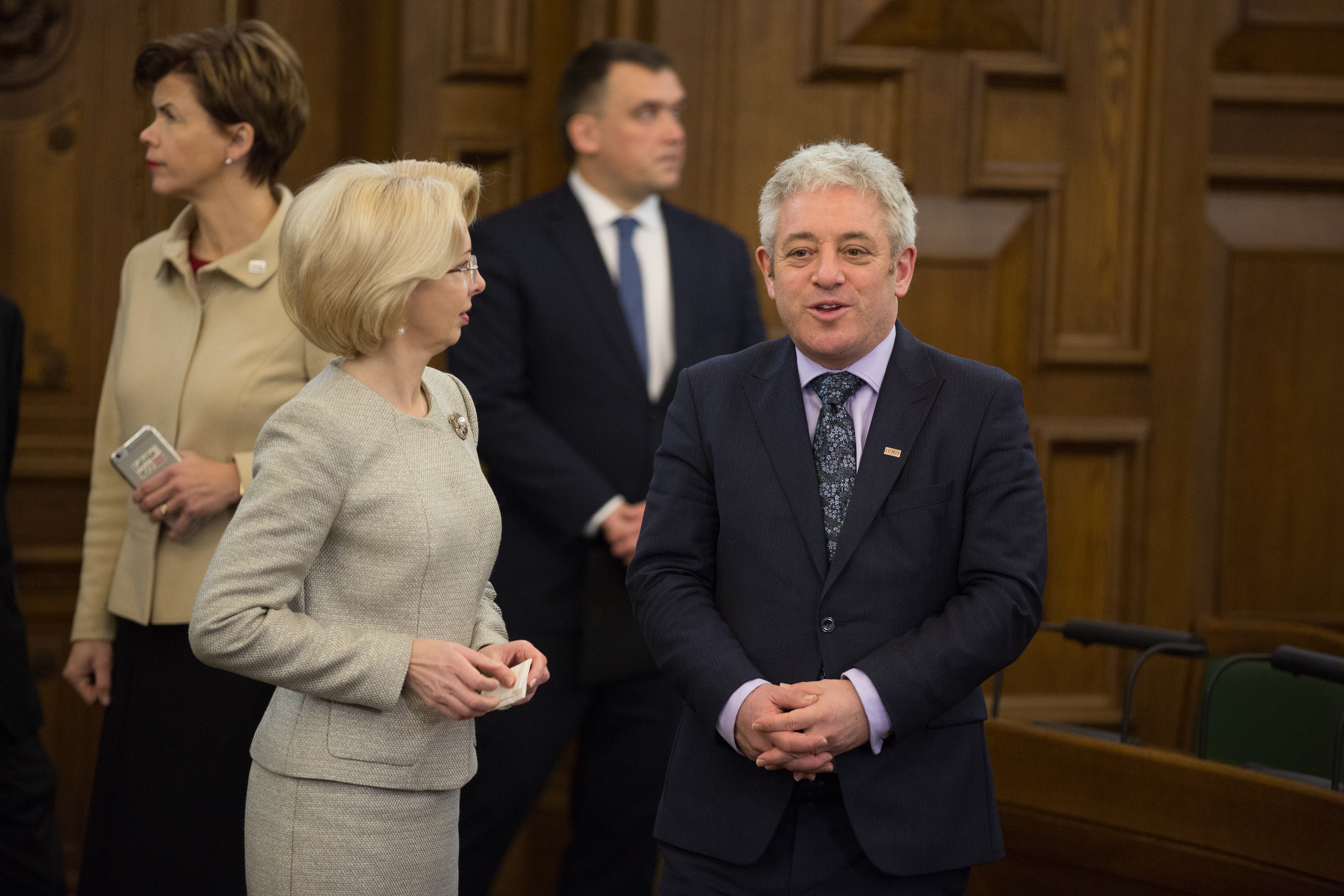
Braže with Ināra Mūrniece and John Bercow on 14 February 2018

In July 2018, Braže made her first official visit to Guernsey where she met with representatives of the Latvian community and also fired the noon-day gun at Castle Cornet, as well as learning about the culture and heritage of the island. On 30 September 2018, in response to Secretary of State for Foreign and Commonwealth Affairs, Jeremy Hunt, comparing the EU to the Soviet Union, Braže tweeted and rebuked the comparison. She said that Soviets "killed, deported, exiled and imprisoned" hundreds of thousands of Latvia's inhabitants and that the Soviets "ruined the lives of 3 generations", contrasting this to the EU which she said had "brought prosperity, equality, growth" and "respect." On 3 December 2018, Braže along with Hunt, lit the lights of a Latvian Christmas tree to mark the centenary celebration of Latvian independence, with Braže stating that the many ties between the two countries "will not change."

On 17 June 2019, Braže hosted a discussion alongside MP and Chair of the Digital, Culture, Media and Sport Committee, Damian Collins, on digital interference in elections and democratic processes, which was also attended by the Chief Executive of the Electoral Commission, Bob Posner.

She served in the position as the Latvian Ambassador to the United Kingdom until May 2020, and was succeeded by Ivita Burmistre.

== Later career (2020–2024) ==
=== NATO Assistant Secretary General: 2020–2023 ===
==== 2020 ====
On 29 January 2020, Foreign Minister Edgars Rinkēvičs announced that Braže would leave her Ambassadorship to take up the position of NATO Assistant Secretary General for Public Diplomacy, tweeting that he was "confident that her knowledge and experience" would be a "great asset for the whole Alliance." Braže herself said that she was looking forward to working for the "most successful defensive alliance" and was congratulated by various officials on her appointment, including by former President Egils Levits and Ambassador Māris Riekstiņš. Braže officially took up the position in May under Secretary General Jens Stoltenberg, becoming the highest ranking Latvian official in organisation's history. In her role, she advised Secretary General Stoltenberg and oversaw the coordination of strategic communication activities across all NATO civilian, military bodies and commands, as well as directing the NATO Public Diplomacy Division.

On 29 May, she participated in a webinar along with Maroš Šefčovič, where she said that NATO had been working for many years to strengthen the resilience of its members and said that it was "clear that more work needs to be done" regarding the COVID-19 pandemic, as well as emphasising that "we all need to work together." She also referred to countering disinformation as an area where more cooperation was needed, stating that NATO was in "close contact" with the EU on the issue. In July, she participated in the Belgrade NATO week, where she addressed the response of NATO to the pandemic and also its role against disinformation, stating that it was important for NATO to "show the facts."

On 25 November, along with the President of the NATO Parliamentary Assembly Gerry Connolly and the Vice President Attila Mesterházy spoke online at an event organised by the German Marshall Fund which took place the day after the 2020 NATO Parliamentary annual session. During her comments, Braže stressed that NATO traditional challenges, such as the actions of Russia in Europe.

At an Atlantic Council event held on 11 December to discuss the bold ideas for the future of NATO, Braže she stated that Russia "cannot veto the decision on expansion of NATO." She also said at the same time, NATO "cannot veto membership of Georgia and Ukraine either" and said that it "largely depends" on "NATO's political decision making process", as well as discussing the practical work that continued to upgrade both Georgia and Ukraine.

==== 2021 ====
On 18 March 2021, Braže hosted an event titled "Gender equality and leadership: are today's leaders leading enough" amid the health crisis which followed the UN 2021 Women in leadership event, attended by Deputy Secretary General, Mircea Geoană and Ambassador David Angell amongst others.

On 6 June, in her speech at the conference for the partnership between Serbia and NATO, Braže said that there was "no vision of peace and security in the Euro-Atlantic region without peace and security in the Western Balkans." She also stated that "facts and clear communications can save lives" and that "proactive communications engages audiences and provide factual information" which she argued "helps to build societal resistance."

In September, at the Lennart Meri Conference held in Estonia which Braže attended, on a panel discussing the withdrawal of U.S. troops from Afghanistan, French Director General for political and security affairs Philippe Errera suggested that there should have been more discussion about the plans of the U.S. with NATO. Braže then went on to say that they were "reeling from Afghanistan" but argued that they "shouldn't have been surprised by the decision" and they should have "listened to American leaders"; arguing that the American leaders "clearly indicated where they stood."

==== 2022 ====
In May 2022, Braže participated in the 14th Istanbul Security Conference held on 25 and 26 May. In her address at the event, Braže said that unity and cohesion was central to NATO and said that, in difficult times, the leadership and commitment of Turkey was needed. She described terrorism as a "persistent global threat" and said that the international community "must tackle it together." She also said that rapid technological change and global interconnectivity were "key points" and said that NATO was "doing everything" to counter those challenges, as well stating that NATO "stands up for its values and way of life" in order to "safeguard the freedom and security of all its members.

On 6 July, Braže opened the Russian War Crimes House exhibition at the NATO headquarters in Brussels, which consisted of photos and videos depicting "Russian atrocities in Ukraine". At the opening, she reiterated the commitment of NATO in the Madrid summit to work with the relevant people to hold all those responsible for war crimes accountable. She stated at the opening "we stand in full solidarity with Ukraine" and said that their courage was "an inspiration".

On 11 July, in an interview with Hype&Hyper, Braže described NATO as a "values-based organisation" and said that the organisation was "more united than ever." She also said that it was "natural" to have differences amongst allies, but they all agreed on the task to "defend and protect each other."

==== 2023 ====
In January 2023, at the biennial conference of Allied Contact Point Embassies hosted by NATO on 26 and 27 January, Braže spoke on the strategic communications of NATO. She said that Contact Point Embassies host a "truly global network", and also said that as the" biggest security challenge in a generation" was being faced, the "cooperative network" of the Contact Point Embassies was important "more than ever" for the allies and partners of NATO.

On 31 March, Braže along with Brigadier General, Ilmars Lejins, raised a flag at the Cinquantenaire Arch which flew until April 5, to commemorate NATO Unity, and also on the occasion of the "historic" 74th anniversary of NATO due to the accession of Finland and the meeting of NATO Foreign Ministers on 4 and 5 April.

In April, Braže travelled to Canberra in Australia where she met with officials from the Department of Foreign Affairs and Trade and also the Chief of the Australian Defence Force, General Angus Campbell, during which she commented on the various different partnerships NATO had around the world and also that each different partnerships were agreed within the Individually Tailored Partnership Programme (ITPP).

In May, at the Final NATO Contact Point Embassy event held in Helsinki, Braže alongside Lithuanian Permanent Representative to NATO, Deividas Matulionis, and Finnish Foreign and Security Policy Director Petri Hakkarainen, contributed to discussions which were moderated by Romanian Ambassador to Finland, Maria Ligor. In her pre-recorded marks, Braže highlighted the importance of support to Ukraine and also to uphold the rules of international order in the current security environment.

In June, ahead of the 2023 Vilinius summit, Braže argued that since the time Russia had invaded Ukraine, China had become "a hostile actor to NATO." She went on to say that China would become a "bigger issue for NATO" if it learned from Russia that the use of force is "something they can get away with"; citing this as a reason that standing for Ukraine was a "matter of international security." She also stated that Russia was "failing" and that Ukraine "will win the war." Braže left her position as NATO assistant Secretary General for Public Diplomacy in June after over three years in the position and was succeeded by Marie-Doha Besancenot.

=== Ambassador at large: 2023–2024 ===
After her departure from NATO, Braže became an Ambassador at Large in the Foreign Ministry in July 2023.

On 23 August 2023, Braže met with the Chair of the Standing Committee on National Defence of the House of Commons of Canada, John McKay, and representatives from the Committee on National Defence. During their meeting, they discussed cooperation between Canada and Latvia on strengthening security in the Baltic region and the Euro-Atlantic region, as well as reinforcing bilateral cooperation between the two countries. They also agreed that Ukraine should continue to receive assistance and also that Russia should be held accountable for its actions. Braže thanked Canada for its contribution to the security of Latvia, highlighting the expansion of NATO in particular, and also commended the country for its stance on the Russian invasion of Ukraine.

On 13 and 14 November 2023, Braže participated in an OECD conference on tackling disinformation and represented Latvia in a panel discussion on coordination within and across governments. During the discussion, she emphasised that close coordination between partners and organisations as well as close coordination at the national level were important in tackling false content, as well as noting a transparent approach was crucial to help identify misinformation. During her visit, she met with the Director for Public Governance and Director for Communications of the OECD, Elsa Pilichowski, and they discussed the role of the organisation in finding better solutions for democratic resilience, amongst other issues including Latvia's approach to develop its strategic communications capacity and the strengthening of the security of the information space.

On 29 November 2023 on a visit to Ukraine, Braže met with the Deputy Head of the office of President Zelenskyy, Igor Zhovkva, and they discussed the Euro-atlantic integration of Ukraine, with Braže confirming Latvia's pledge to help support Ukraine.

== Foreign minister (2024–2026) ==
=== Appointment and joining New Unity ===
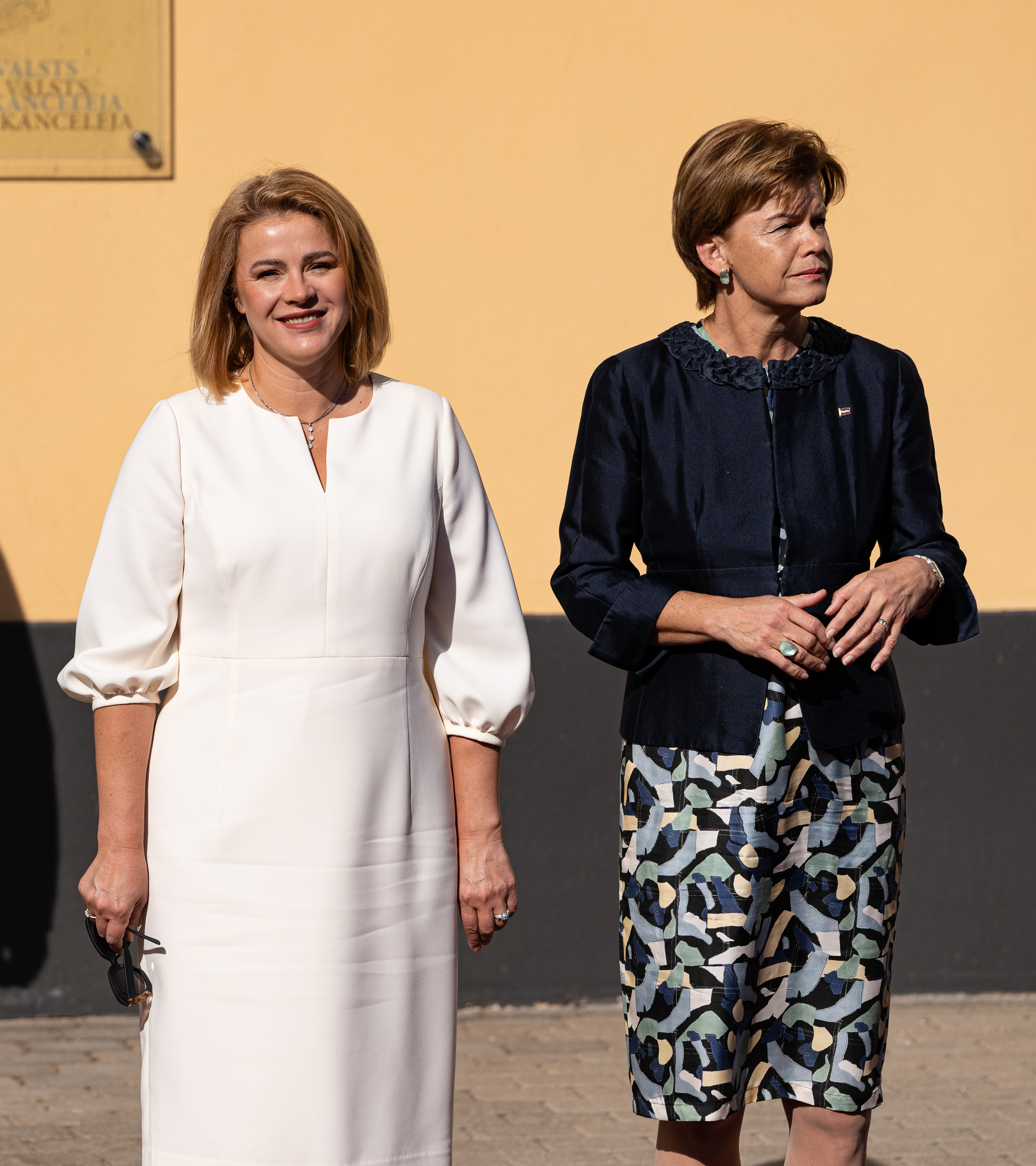
Prime Minister Evika Siliņa (left) appointed Braže (right) as Minister of Foreign Affairs

On 10 April 2024, former Prime Minister and incumbent Foreign Minister Krišjānis Kariņš resigned amidst a scandal of his alleged misuse of public funds on private aviation during his premiership, leaving the office on Foreign Minister vacant. On 15 April, Braže was nominated by New Unity to become the Minister of Foreign Affairs. On 17 April, President Edgars Rinkēvičs, himself being the longest serving Foreign Minister in Latvian history and the predecessor of Kariņš, announced his support for Braže. Prime Minister Evika Siliņa also reiterated her support for Braže, describing Braže as a "strong candidate" and stating that she had not heard of "any doubts" expressed about Braže's "professionalism." On 19 April, The Saeima confirmed her appointment with 66 votes for, 11 votes against and 9 abstentions. Braže was appointed Minister of Foreign Affairs under Prime Minister Siliņa, succeeding Kariņš. She became the second female Foreign Minister in Latvia's history, after Sandra Kalniete.

Prime Minister Silinia reported invited Braže to join New Unity after Braže's nomination by the party to the position of Foreign Minister, and at the time of her nomination, Braže stated in a radio interview that she was considering the offer. On 4 June, Braže joined New Unity, having not previously been in a political party during her entire diplomatic career for over 30 years. She had previously held the role of Minister of Foreign Affairs between 19 April and 4 June on a non-partisan basis.

=== European Union ===
On 22 April 2024, Braže made her first trip abroad to Luxembourg where she attended a meeting of the Foreign Affairs Council (FAC). During the joint session of Foreign Affairs Ministers and Defence Ministers, Braže stated that the EU must "take action immediately" so that assistance to Ukraine would not decrease and also said that it was important to "align EU sanctions on Belarus with the regime of sanctions against Russia." She also called on the EU to take "resolute action" to expand Iran's drone sanctions regime to "include ballistic missiles."

On 27 May, Braže attended the FAC which focused on support to Ukraine and also the situation in the middle east. Braže said that Ukraine must receive "all necessary support" which included the EU's "14th package of sanctions of Russia" as well as stating that Latvia remained "friends of Georgia on its path to the EU."

On 24 June, Braže attended the EU FAC in Luxembourg where she said that "significant progress" had been made on "restricting Russia's capabilities" and that the sanctions package contained "vital decisions." She additionally stated that the "new round of sanctions" against Russia was in the "security interests of the EU as a whole."

=== NATO ===
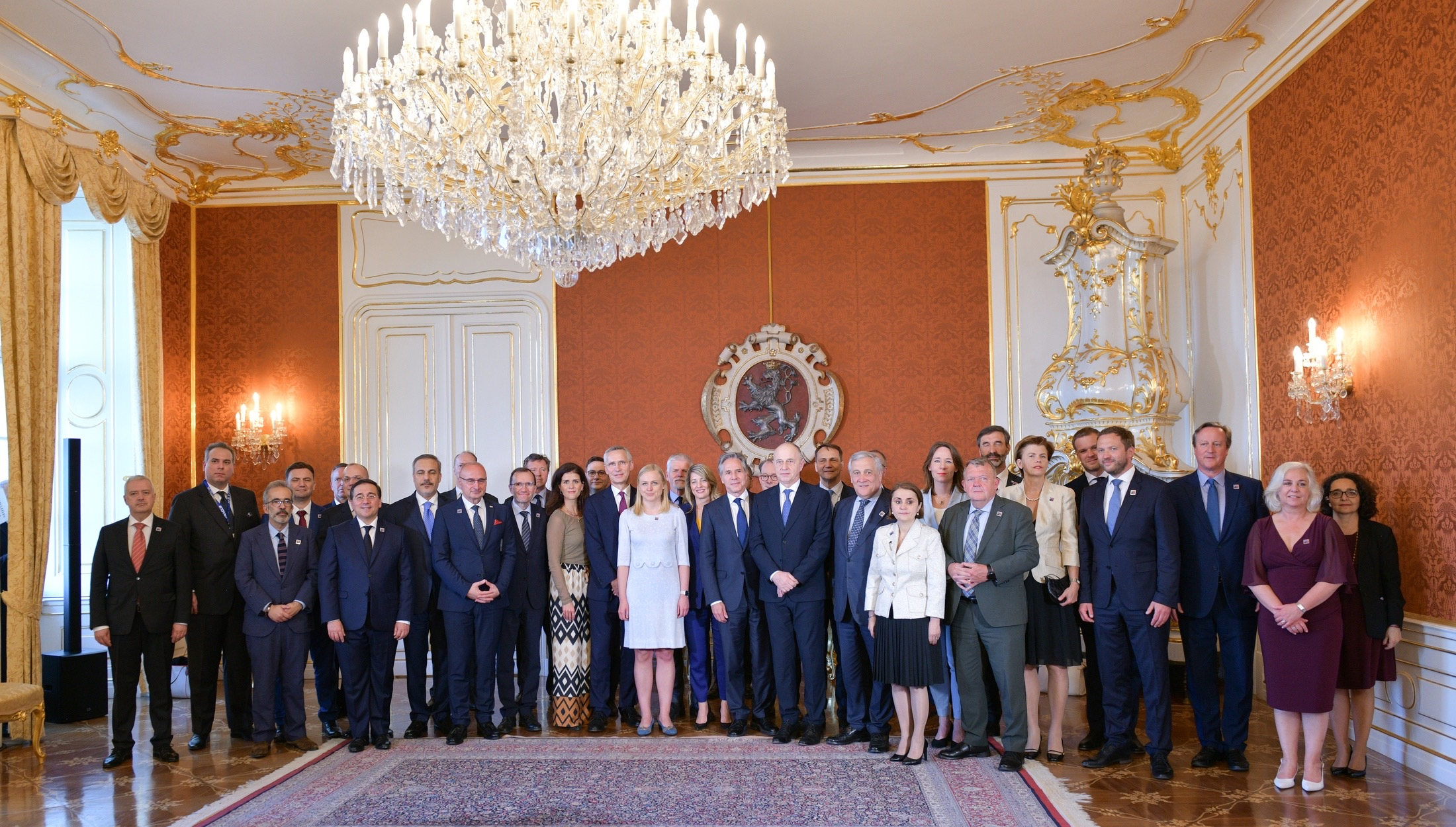
Braže (standing 6th from the right) at the NATO Foreign Ministers meeting on 31 May 2024

On 23 May 2024, Braže met with NATO Secretary General, Jens Stoltenberg in Brussels. During their meeting, Stoltenberg and Braže focused on the priorities of NATO for the July Washington summit and also the development of the defence capabilities of NATO, as well as support for Ukraine and developing a strategy to counteract Russia. Braže stated that she expected "practical results" regarding NATO "deterrence and defence" and also boosting of the capabilities of NATO's defence industry. She also underlined the importance of all member states contributing 2% of GDP to the alliance, and also described sufficient support for Ukraine as of "critical importance." Braže also met with Assistant Secretaries General David van Weel and Angus Lapsley, and then took part in a meeting of ambassadors to NATO from the Eastern flank of the alliance, and later met with officials from the Public Diplomacy division of NATO.

Braže attended the informal meeting of NATO Foreign Ministers on 30 and 31 May, during which she secured a package of support for Ukraine at the Washington summit as a "strategic priority and goal." She also advocated for the strengthening of NATO's defence capabilities, stating that deterrence and defence were "consistent" with NATO's "readiness to respond immediately" and to protect "every square centimetre of the alliance." She also said that by the time of the Washington summit, an "absolute majority" of NATO allies would have reached the target of at least 2% GDP on their defence.

=== Europe ===
==== Russia-Ukraine war ====
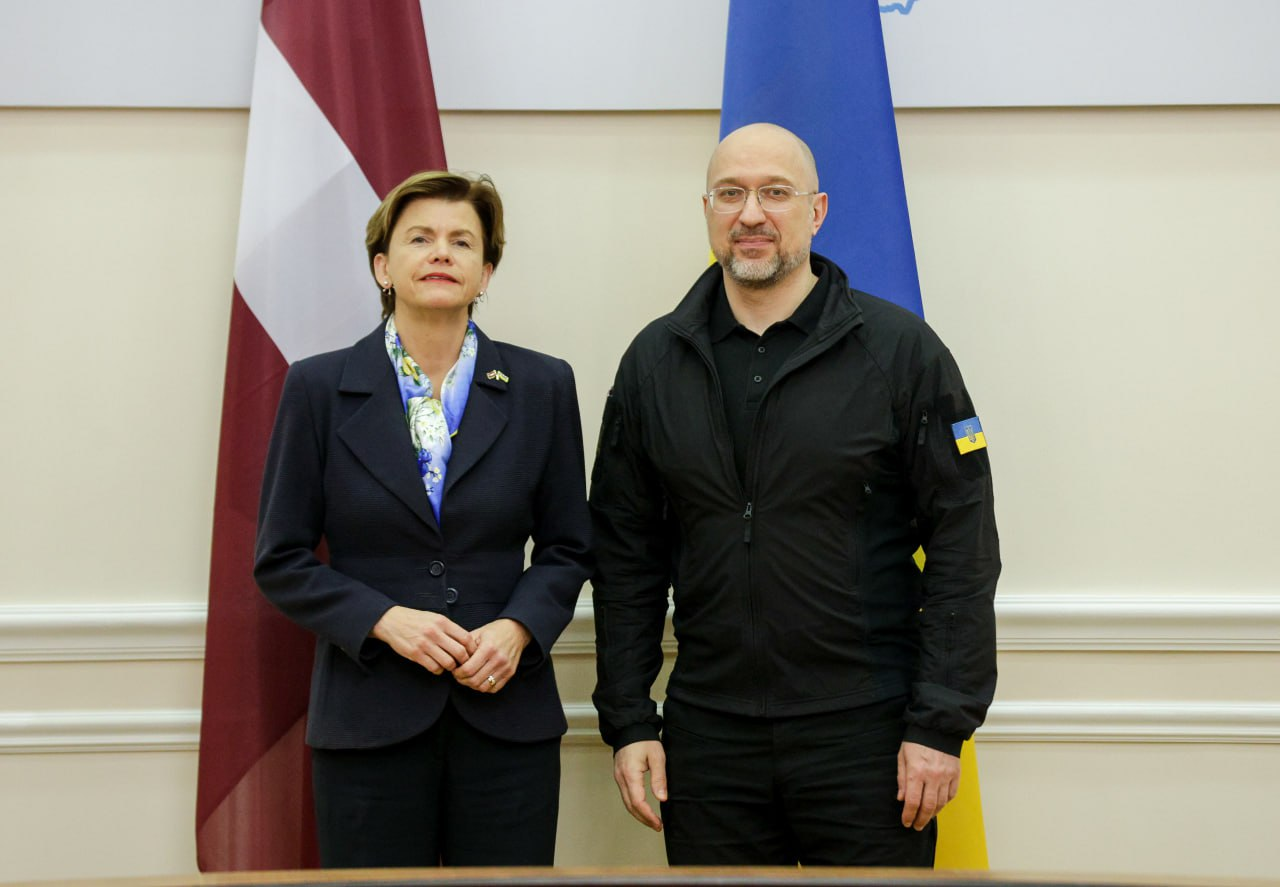
Braže with Ukrainian Prime Minister Denys Shmyhal on 26 April 2024

On 26 April 2024, Braže undertook her visit bilateral visit as Foreign Minister which was to Ukraine. She met with the Ukrainian Minister of Foreign Affairs, Dmytro Kuleba, where she confirmed Latvia's intention to advocate for EU sanctions on Russia. Braže also laid flowers with Kuleba at the Wall of Remembrance in honour of Ukrainian soldiers who had died during the war. She also met with Chairman of the Verkhovna Rada, Ruslan Stefanchuk, where she reaffirmed the intention of Latvia to support the reconstruction of Ukraine. Braže met with Prime Minister Denys Shmyhal and they discussed the practical steps for Euro-Atlantic integration for Ukraine, as well as meeting the Deputy Prime Minister for European and Euro-Atlantic Integration, Olha Stefanishyna, and they discussed the integration of Ukraine into the EU. During her visit, she also met with Oleksandr Lytvynenko and visited a restored thermal power plant that had previously damaged in 2022 with Deputy Minister Mykola Kolisnyk.

On 10 May, during her visit to Lithuania, she said that Ukraine was a "priority for all the Baltic states," and the victory of Ukraine was a "common goal" for all of them. On 23 May, after meeting Secretary General Stoltenberg, Braže said that providing "sufficient support" to Ukraine was of "critical importance" and also stated that Ukraine had the right to also "use weapons supplied by the West for strikes at military facilities in the Russian territory from where Russia attacks Ukraine." On 27 May, at the FAC in Brussels, Braže called on countries that were blocking help to Ukraine to "relent" so the "necessary military aid" could be provided to Ukraine. She also stated that the situation in Ukraine "directly correlates" with "security situation in Latvia and also in the European Union," and also said "we will not be safe until Ukraine prevails."

=== North America ===
==== United States ====
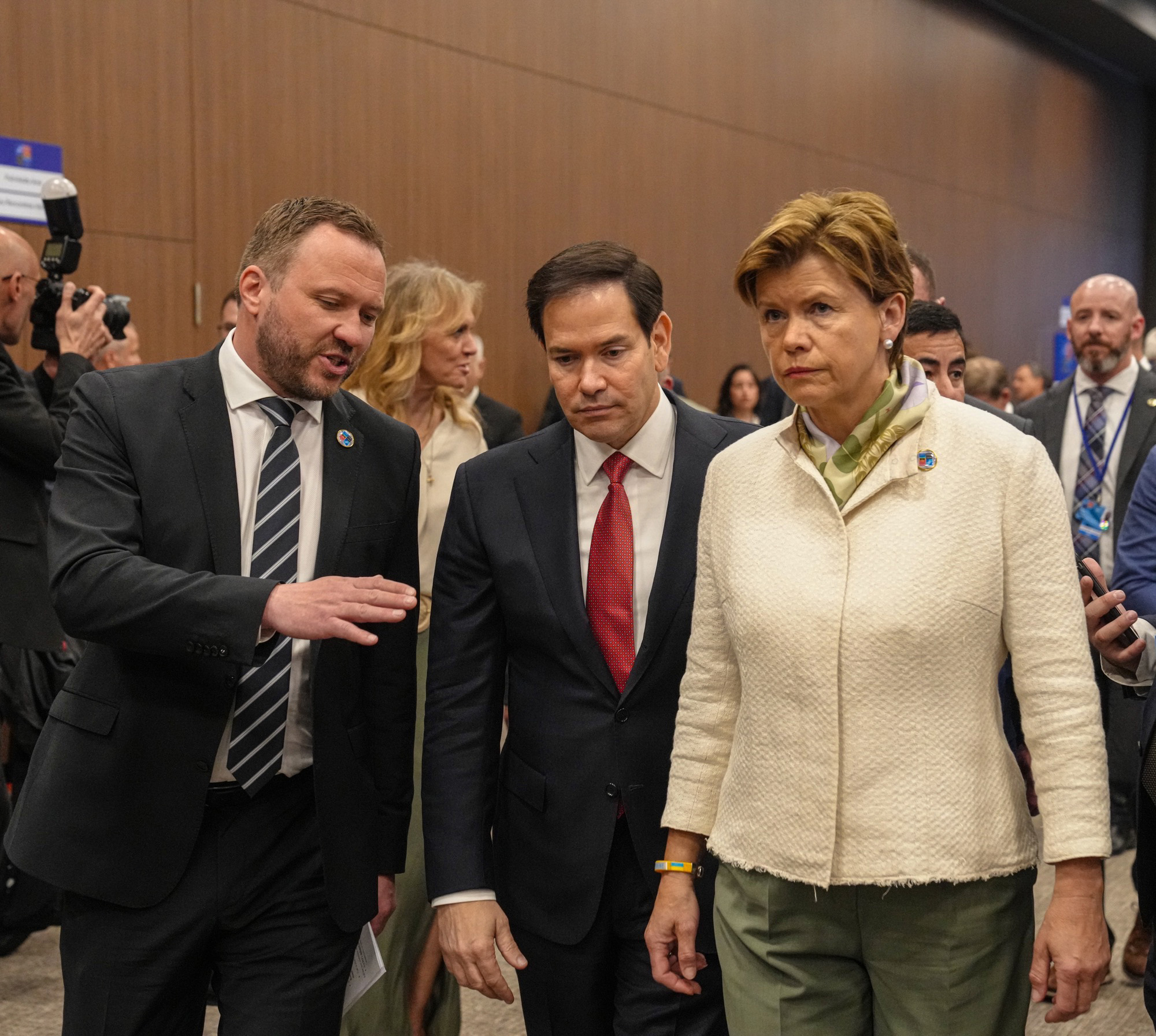
Braze with Secretary of State Marco Rubio (centre) and Margus Tsahkna (left) in May 2025.

On 21 June 2024, Braže met with the United States Ambassador to Latvia, Christopher T. Robinson, and they discussed holding Russia to account for the War in Ukraine and also the cooperation between Latvia and the United States. Braže thanked the United States for its presence in Latvia and its contribution to strengthening security in the region, as well as calling for further cooperation in defence and deterrence through the increase in NATO forces in the region. Braže and Robinson also discussed the potential for economic cooperation between the two countries and they both agreed to deepen cooperation on trade, amongst other issues.

==== Canada ====
On 31 May 2024, at the meeting of NATO Foreign Ministers, Braže had her first meeting with the Canadian Minister of Foreign Affairs, Mélanie Joly, in Prague. They discussed the bilateral cooperation between the two countries and support for Ukraine, with Braže thanking Canada for its contribution to the security and defence of Latvia. As they exchanged views on bilateral cooperation, Braže stated that Canada had "always been a strong friend an ally of Latvia" and she thanked Canada for being the "guarantor" of Latvia's security. Braže also welcomed the establishment of the Latvia-Canada cooperation group in the Parliament of Canada and also said that she had "high regard" for Canada's "considerable political, military, humanitarian and financial support" to Ukraine. Braže and Joly also discussed the potential for economic cooperation in various fields including renewable energy, with Braže welcoming the economic policy dialogue established between Canada and Latvia in January earlier the same year.

On 7 June, Braže met with the Canadian Ambassador to NATO, David Angell, Ambassador Brian Szwarc and other military officials including Vice Admiral Scott Bishop in Riga to discuss bilateral security cooperation. She described the Canadian presence in Latvia as a "strong political statement" of the "solidarity" of the Allies and of "NATO's unity." During her meeting with Angell, she reiterated the need to support Ukraine and said that there would not be a long term guarantee of peace in the region without the victory of Ukraine in the region.

== Personal life ==
Braže is fluent in Latvian, English, Russian and Dutch. She has said that she used to play tennis and do pilates, and that she enjoys horse riding.

Braže is married to Tjaco van den Hout, a former Dutch Ambassador and visiting professorial fellow at the Riga Graduate School of Law. She marks the time when she was ambassador to the Netherlands, driving her car, opening the window and waving to van den Hout, who was on a bicycle, as the beginning of their relationship, despite having met before. They have one daughter together, Brigita, born in August 2005 during Braže's tenure as Ambassador to the Netherlands. When her husband became the Dutch ambassador to Thailand, Laos, Cambodia and Myanmar, she lived in Thailand, where she studied Buddhism, language and regional studies from 2008 to 2010 at Chulalongkorn University. Her husband recalls an anecdote whereby at a garden party at Buckingham Palace during Braže's tenure as Ambassador to the UK, Prince Philip Duke of Edinburgh spoke to them both and once he understood that they were both ambassadors, he remarked that it "must make for interesting pillow talk."

On 20 May 2024, Braže participated in a half marathon fundraiser which collected over 14000 euros in order to purchase military drones for the defence of Ukraine.

== Honours ==
- Officer of the Legion of Honour, 2001
- Grand Officer of the Order of Prince Henry, 2003
- Grand Officer of the Order of Orange-Nassau, 2006
- Cross of Recognition, 2nd class, 2008
- Certificate of Recognition, Ministry of Foreign Affairs, 2012
- Certificate of Appreciation, Minister of Foreign Affairs, 2015
- Certificate of Recognition, Ministry of Defence, 2018

== See also ==
- List of current foreign ministers
- List of ministers for foreign affairs of Latvia
- List of female foreign ministers
- Lists of Légion d'honneur recipients
