= Ray MacSharry =

Irish former politician (born 1938)

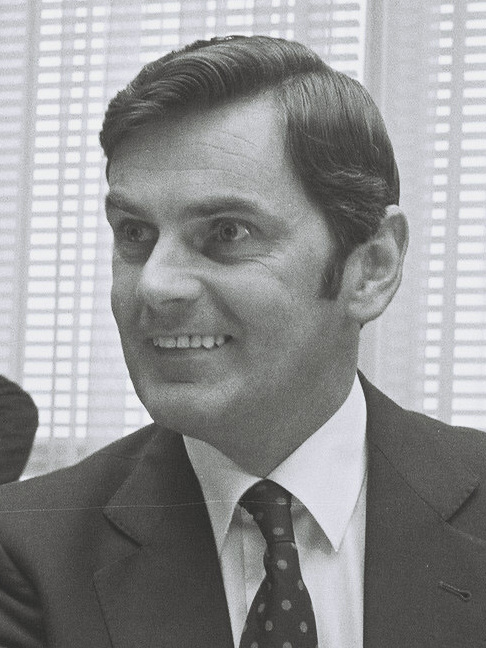
- MacSharry in 1980

European Commissioner for Agriculture and Rural Development
- In office 6 January 1989 – 4 January 1993
- President: Jacques Delors
- Preceded by: Frans Andriessen
- Succeeded by: René Steichen

Minister for Finance
- In office 10 March 1987 – 24 November 1988
- Taoiseach: Charles Haughey
- Preceded by: John Bruton
- Succeeded by: Albert Reynolds
- In office 9 March 1982 – 14 December 1982
- Taoiseach: Charles Haughey
- Preceded by: John Bruton
- Succeeded by: Alan Dukes

Tánaiste
- In office 9 March 1982 – 14 December 1982
- Taoiseach: Charles Haughey
- Preceded by: Michael O'Leary
- Succeeded by: Dick Spring

Minister for Agriculture
- In office 12 December 1979 – 30 June 1981
- Taoiseach: Charles Haughey
- Preceded by: Jim Gibbons
- Succeeded by: Alan Dukes

Minister of State
- 1978–1979: Public Service

Teachta Dála
- In office July 1969 – 24 November 1988
- Constituency: Sligo–Leitrim

Member of the European Parliament
- In office 14 June 1984 – 10 March 1987
- Constituency: Connacht–Ulster

Personal details
- Born: Raymond MacSharry; 29 April 1938 (age 88) Sligo, Ireland
- Party: Fianna Fáil
- Spouse: Elaine Neilan (m. 1960; died 2008)
- Children: 6, including Marc
- Education: University College Galway

Ray MacSharry (born 29 April 1938) is an Irish former Fianna Fáil politician who served as Tánaiste from March 1982 to December 1982, European Commissioner for Agriculture and Rural Development from 1989 to 1993, Minister for Finance from March 1982 to December 1982 and 1987 to 1988, Minister for Agriculture from 1979 to 1981, Minister of State at the Department of the Public Service from 1978 to 1979. He served as a Teachta Dála (TD) for the Sligo–Leitrim constituency from 1969 to 1988. He also served as Member of the European Parliament (MEP) for the Connacht–Ulster constituency.

== Early life ==
Born in Sligo, MacSharry was educated at the local national school before later briefly attending Summerhill College. After leaving school he worked as a livestock dealer throughout County Sligo and County Mayo, before becoming involved in the Meat Exporters Factory in his native town. MacSharry also owned his haulage firm.

== Political career ==
=== Beginnings ===
MacSharry came from a non-political family; however, he became an active member of Fianna Fáil in Sligo. In 1967, he made his first move into politics when he secured election to both Sligo Borough Council and Sligo County Council.

MacSharry was first elected to Dáil Éireann as a Fianna Fáil TD for the Sligo–Leitrim constituency at the 1969 general election. MacSharry was re-elected to the Dáil at the 1973 general election; however, Fianna Fáil went into opposition as a Fine Gael–Labour Party government came to office. In Jack Lynch's subsequent front bench reshuffle, MacSharry was appointed Opposition Spokesperson on the Office of Public Works.

Following the 1977 general election, Fianna Fáil returned to government with a twenty-seat Dáil majority. In January 1978, with the introduction of the new Minister of State positions, he secured a junior ministerial post for the first time, as Minister of State at the Department of the Public Service.

=== Cabinet minister ===
In December 1979, Lynch announced his resignation as Taoiseach and as Fianna Fáil leader. The subsequent leadership contest was a straight battle between George Colley and Charles Haughey. Colley was the favoured choice of the outgoing leadership and the majority of the cabinet while Haughey had the backing of a large rump of backbench TDs who had become disillusioned with the party leadership. Although MacSharry was serving as junior minister to Colley, he was one of the strongest supporters of Haughey and nominated him for the position of party leader. Haughey succeeded in becoming party leader, albeit by a narrow margin of just six votes, and soon after was appointed as Taoiseach. MacSharry's support for Haughey was rewarded when he was appointed Minister for Agriculture in the new government. Agriculture was viewed as a key portfolio in Haughey's new cabinet and MacSharry was regarded as an effective Minister at a time when farm prices were falling. He was also successful in agricultural negotiations with the EEC.

Following the 1981 general election, Fianna Fáil returned to opposition. In the new Fianna Fáil front bench, MacSharry was retained as Spokesperson for Agriculture, but a later reshuffle saw him move to fisheries.

Fianna Fáil returned to government following the February 1982 general election and MacSharry was appointed as Tánaiste and Minister for Finance. At a time when Ireland was going through a recession, MacSharry introduced a budget which increased income tax at all levels. It was his only budget as the government fell after just nine months in office and a new coalition government of Fine Gael and the Labour Party took office.

=== 1983 bugging scandal ===
In 1983, MacSharry resigned from the Fianna Fáil front bench due to the phone tapping scandal, when it was revealed that as Tánaiste and Minister for Finance, he had borrowed police tape recorders to secretly record conversations with a cabinet colleague. He defended his action by saying that rumours were sweeping the party that he could be "bought" to support efforts to depose Haughey; he claimed he used the equipment to record any attempts made to offer bribes. The scandal was however primarily focused on the decision by the Minister for Justice, Seán Doherty, to bug the phones of two leading political journalists to discover their anti-Haughey sources. MacSharry was a secondary but high-profile casualty of the scandal, as the equipment he had used had been supplied by Doherty, who had requested it from Assistant Garda Commissioner Joseph Ainsworth. Ainsworth was also forced to resign when the scandal reached the headlines.

=== Political comeback and European Commissioner ===
MacSharry spent several years in the political wilderness following the phone-tapping scandal. He was elected to the European Parliament as an MEP for Connacht–Ulster at the 1984 election.

Following the 1987 general election, MacSharry was returned to the Dáil. He resigned his European Parliament seat when he was appointed again as Minister for Finance in Haughey's new government. During his second tenure in charge of finance, MacSharry committed himself to bringing order to the public finances and the poor economic situation. His ruthless cutting of state spending earned him the nickname "Mack the Knife".

During this time he came to be identified as Haughey's heir apparent as Taoiseach and Fianna Fáil leader. MacSharry, however, had no such aspirations and had wanted to leave politics by the time he was forty-five. He was now fifty and had achieved some of the highest offices in the government of Ireland. In 1988, MacSharry's loyalty to Haughey was rewarded when he was appointed European Commissioner. As a result of this he resigned his Dáil seat, ending his domestic political career.

MacSharry was the first European Commissioner for Agriculture to work out a meaningful compromise on reform of the Common Agricultural Policy in 1992. The MacSharry reforms marked the turning point between the old CAP policy, and the new, although many other reforms followed his.

== Retirement from politics ==
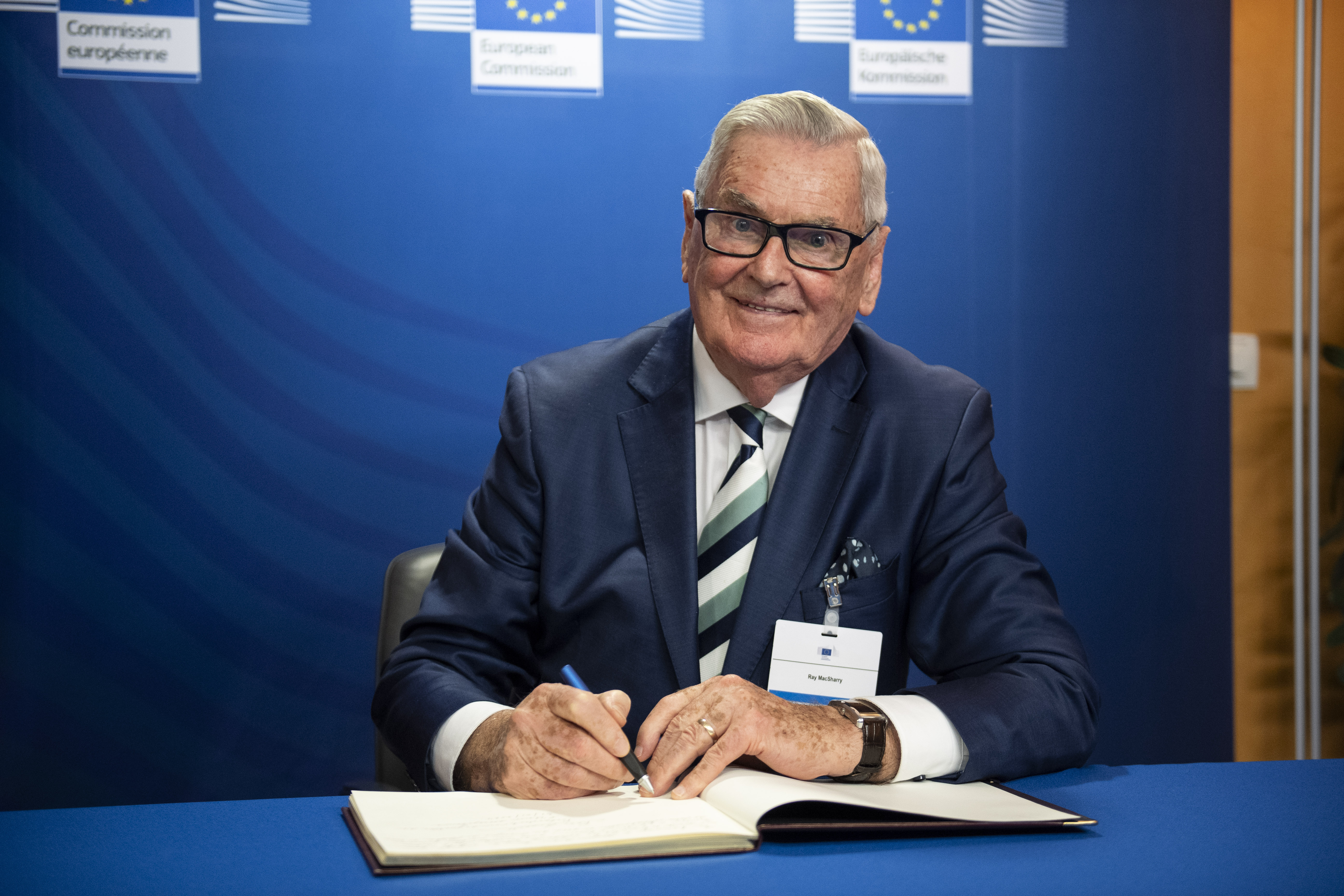
Ray MacSharry in 2024 signing Jacques Delors's book of condolences.

Following the completion of his term as European Commissioner, MacSharry retired from politics to pursue business interests. He is currently a director on the boards of a variety of companies including Bank of Ireland and Ryanair Holdings. In 1999, he was appointed chairman of Eircom plc. MacSharry is also a member of the Comite d'Honneur of the Institute of European Affairs.

MacSharry is a non-executive director of Irish Life and Permanent and receives pension payments of €88,936 every year.

== Private life ==
MacSharry was married to Elaine and the couple had six children. One of his sons, Marc MacSharry, has served as a Councillor on Sligo County Council, as a Senator in Seanad Éireann representing the Industrial and Commercial Panel from 2002 to 2016, and as a TD for the constituency of Sligo–Leitrim since 2016. His nephew Tom MacSharry was a Councillor on Sligo Borough Council, 2004–09, and served as Mayor in 2006–07.

== See also ==
- Families in the Oireachtas

Political offices
New office	Minister of State at the Department of the Public Service; 1978–1979	Succeeded by Seán Calleary
Preceded by Jim Gibbons	Minister for Agriculture; 1979–1981	Succeeded by Alan Dukes
Preceded by Michael O'Leary	Tánaiste; 1982	Succeeded by Dick Spring
Preceded by John Bruton	Minister for Finance; 1982	Succeeded by Alan Dukes
Preceded by John Bruton	Minister for Finance; 1987–1988	Succeeded by Albert Reynolds
Preceded by Peter Sutherland	Irish European Commissioner; 1989–1993	Succeeded by Pádraig Flynn
Preceded by Frans Andriessen	European Commissioner for Agriculture and Rural Development; 1989–1993	Succeeded by René Steichen
Party political offices
Preceded by George Colley	Deputy leader of Fianna Fáil; 1982–1983	Succeeded by Brian Lenihan Snr

Dáil	Election	Deputy (Party)	Deputy (Party)	Deputy (Party)	Deputy (Party)	Deputy (Party)
13th	1948	Eugene Gilbride (FF)	Stephen Flynn (FF)	Bernard Maguire (Ind.)	Mary Reynolds (FG)	Joseph Roddy (FG)
14th	1951	Eugene Gilbride (FF)	Stephen Flynn (FF)	Patrick Rogers (FG)	Mary Reynolds (FG)	Joseph Roddy (FG)
15th	1954	Eugene Gilbride (FF)	Stephen Flynn (FF)	Bernard Maguire (Ind.)	Mary Reynolds (FG)	Joseph Roddy (FG)
16th	1957	Eugene Gilbride (FF)	Stephen Flynn (FF)	John Joe McGirl (SF)	Mary Reynolds (FG)	Patrick Rogers (FG)
16th	1961 by-election	Eugene Gilbride (FF)	Joseph McLoughlin (FG)	John Joe McGirl (SF)	Mary Reynolds (FG)	Patrick Rogers (FG)
17th	1961	Eugene Gilbride (FF)	Joseph McLoughlin (FG)	James Gallagher (FF)	Eugene Gilhawley (FG)	4 seats 1961–1969
18th	1965	Eugene Gilbride (FF)	Joseph McLoughlin (FG)	James Gallagher (FF)	Eugene Gilhawley (FG)	4 seats 1961–1969
19th	1969	Ray MacSharry (FF)	Joseph McLoughlin (FG)	James Gallagher (FF)	3 seats 1969–1981	
20th	1973	Ray MacSharry (FF)	Joseph McLoughlin (FG)	Eugene Gilhawley (FG)	3 seats 1969–1981	
21st	1977	Ray MacSharry (FF)	James Gallagher (FF)	Eugene Gilhawley (FG)	3 seats 1969–1981	
22nd	1981	Ray MacSharry (FF)	John Ellis (FF)	Joe McCartin (FG)	Ted Nealon (FG)	4 seats 1981–2007
23rd	1982 (Feb)	Ray MacSharry (FF)	John Ellis (FF)	Matt Brennan (FF)	Ted Nealon (FG)	4 seats 1981–2007
24th	1982 (Nov)	Ray MacSharry (FF)	Joe McCartin (FG)	Matt Brennan (FF)	Ted Nealon (FG)	4 seats 1981–2007
25th	1987	Ray MacSharry (FF)	John Ellis (FF)	Matt Brennan (FF)	Ted Nealon (FG)	4 seats 1981–2007
26th	1989	Gerry Reynolds (FG)	John Ellis (FF)	Matt Brennan (FF)	Ted Nealon (FG)	4 seats 1981–2007
27th	1992	Declan Bree (Lab)	John Ellis (FF)	Matt Brennan (FF)	Ted Nealon (FG)	4 seats 1981–2007
28th	1997	Gerry Reynolds (FG)	John Ellis (FF)	Matt Brennan (FF)	John Perry (FG)	4 seats 1981–2007
29th	2002	Marian Harkin (Ind.)	John Ellis (FF)	Jimmy Devins (FF)	John Perry (FG)	4 seats 1981–2007
30th	2007	Constituency abolished. See Sligo–North Leitrim and Roscommon–South Leitrim				

Dáil	Election	Deputy (Party)	Deputy (Party)	Deputy (Party)	Deputy (Party)
32nd	2016	Martin Kenny (SF)	Marc MacSharry (FF)	Eamon Scanlon (FF)	Tony McLoughlin (FG)
33rd	2020	Martin Kenny (SF)	Marc MacSharry (FF)	Marian Harkin (Ind.)	Frank Feighan (FG)
34th	2024	Martin Kenny (SF)	Eamon Scanlon (FF)	Marian Harkin (Ind.)	Frank Feighan (FG)
