= Cristina Gutiérrez-Cortines =

Spanish politician (born 1939)

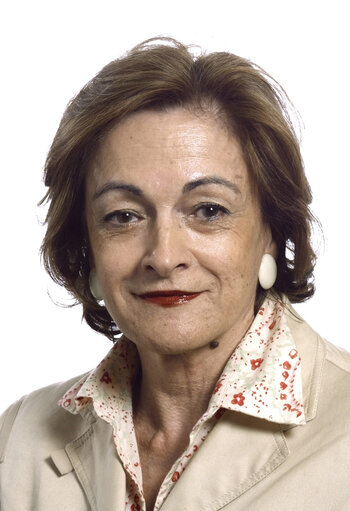

Member of the European Parliament for Spain
- In office 1999–2014

Personal details
- Born: 17 December 1939 (age 86) Madrid, Spain
- Party: People's Party

Cristina Gutiérrez-Cortines (born 17 December 1939 in Madrid) is a Spanish politician and Member of the European Parliament with the People's Party, part of the European People's Party and sits on the European Parliament's Committee on the Environment, Public Health and Food Safety.

She is a substitute for the Committee on Budgetary Control and the Committee on Industry, Research and Energy. She is also substitute for the Delegation to the EU-Turkey Joint Parliamentary Committee, and a member of the Reconciliation of European Histories Group.

== Education ==
- Doctor of art history
- Professor of art history
- Researcher in art and architecture, urban planning and the history of urban development as well as in the use of new technologies in the field of art history

== Career ==
- 1978-1993: Director of cultural events and evening courses, University of Murcia
- 1989-1995: Director of the cultural events of La Verdad newspaper (Murcia)
- 1995-1999: Minister of Education and Culture, Murcia regional government
- 1995-2003: Director of the Botín Foundation course on "sustainable development and conservation of the historical and natural heritage"
- since 1999: Member of the European Parliament

== See also ==
- 2004 European Parliament election in Spain
- Universidad Popular de Cartagena
