= Resistance Fighting Day =

Public holiday of Estonia

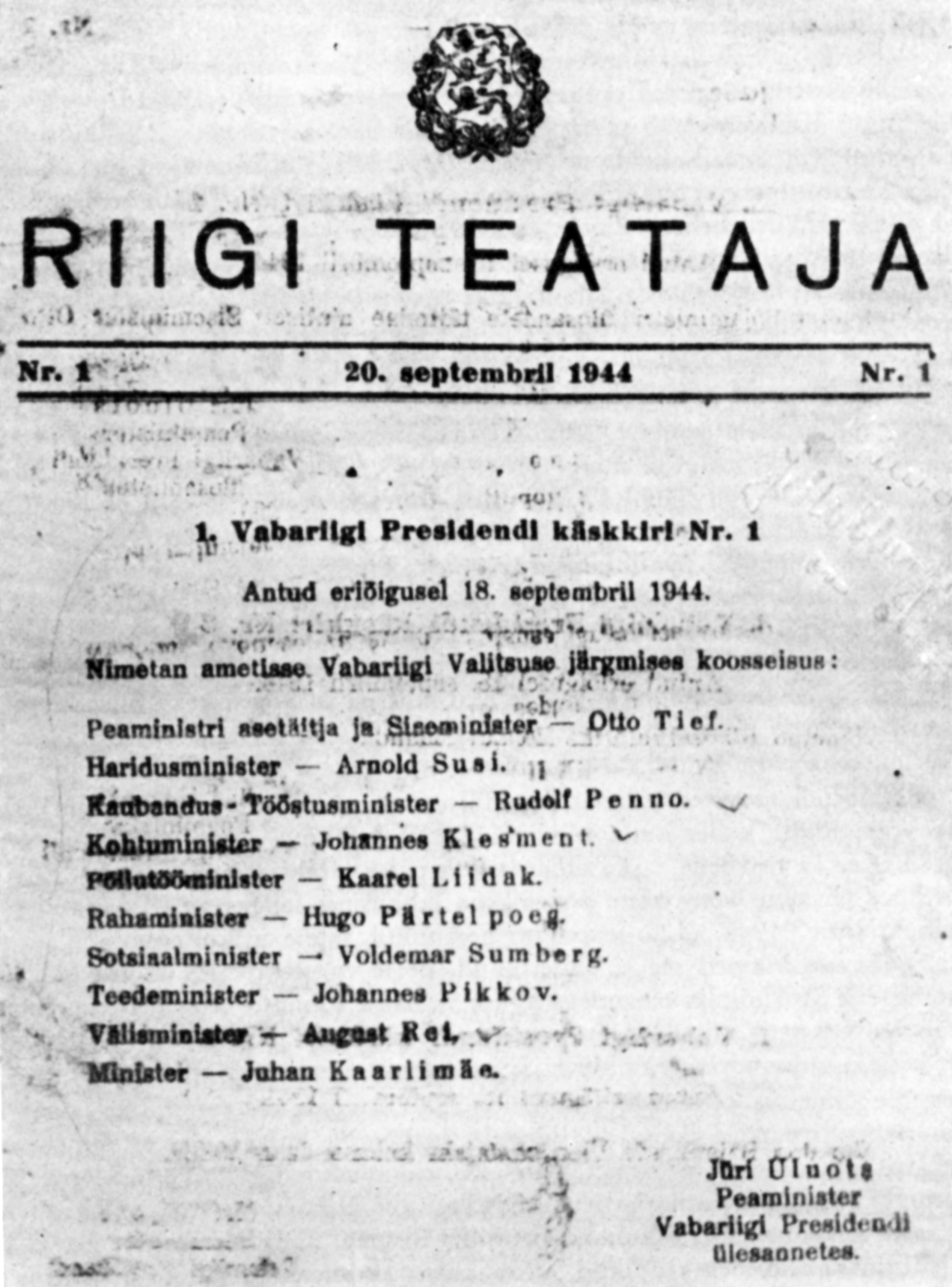
The appointed Government of Estonia in Riigi Teataja

Resistance Fighting Day (Estonian: Vastupanuvõitluse päev) also known as Otto Tief Government Day (Estonian: Otto Tiefi valitsuse päev) is a national holiday in Estonia which takes on 22 September. It honors the Estonian commander Otto Tief's attempt to restore Estonian independence in 1944. The holiday is a date of remembrance, commemorating the victims of the subsequent re-establishment of Soviet rule in Estonia following the Nazi rule, and the resulting sovietisation of the republic from 1944 to 1950. It falls under the cultural symbols designed to recognize the Occupation of the Baltic states until 1991. It was known in the former Estonian SSR, as well as today by the Russian Federation and pro-Russian forces in Estonia as the Day of the Liberation of Tallinn from Nazi Invaders (Russian: День освобождения Таллина от немецко-фашистских захватчиков), celebrating the Soviet Tallinn Offensive by the Red Army's 2nd Shock and 8th Armies and the Baltic Fleet against the Wehrmacht.

== Observances ==
The proposal to mark 22 September as a national holiday was launched in 2005 by the Pro Patria Union and the Res Publica Party The holiday was renamed from Day of the Resistance to Resistance Fighting Day by order of the Riigikogu on 15 February 2007. The day was first officially celebrated that year. The main ceremony is held at the Freedom Square in the capital city of Tallinn. Official solemnities begin at sunrise when students from a local school raise the flag of Estonia at the Pikk Hermann. On Resistance Day, the Vabamu Museum of Occupations and Freedom opened an exhibit about the meeting of exiled Estonians and Soviet Estonians. during the Expo 67 in Montreal. The museum is open for free on the holiday.

=== Soviet Liberation Day ===
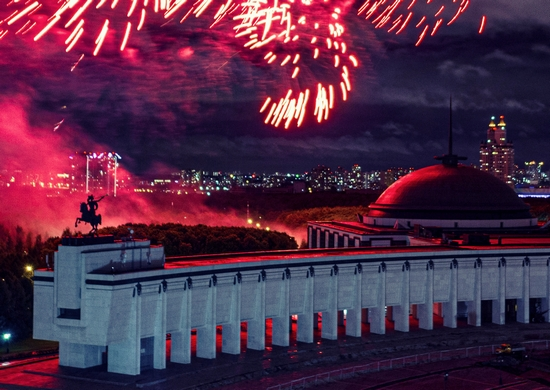
Fireworks in Moscow in the occasion of Liberation Day in 2019.

Veterans of the 8th Estonian Rifle Corps often lead solemn ceremonies in the capital. On the third anniversary in 1947, the Bronze Soldier of Tallinn was created. In 2019, the Ministry of Foreign Affairs rebutted claims by Russian foreign ministry spokesperson Maria Zakharova that the Tallinn Offensive was a liberation, saying that it was a false presentation of the "liberation of European peoples from fascist enslavement". That year, a fireworks celebration marking the 75th anniversary of the offensive took place in Moscow.

== See also ==
- Independence Day (Estonia)
- Võidupüha
- Estonia in World War II
- Liberation Day (Moldova)
- Liberation Day (Ukraine)
