= Franz Fischler =

Austrian politician

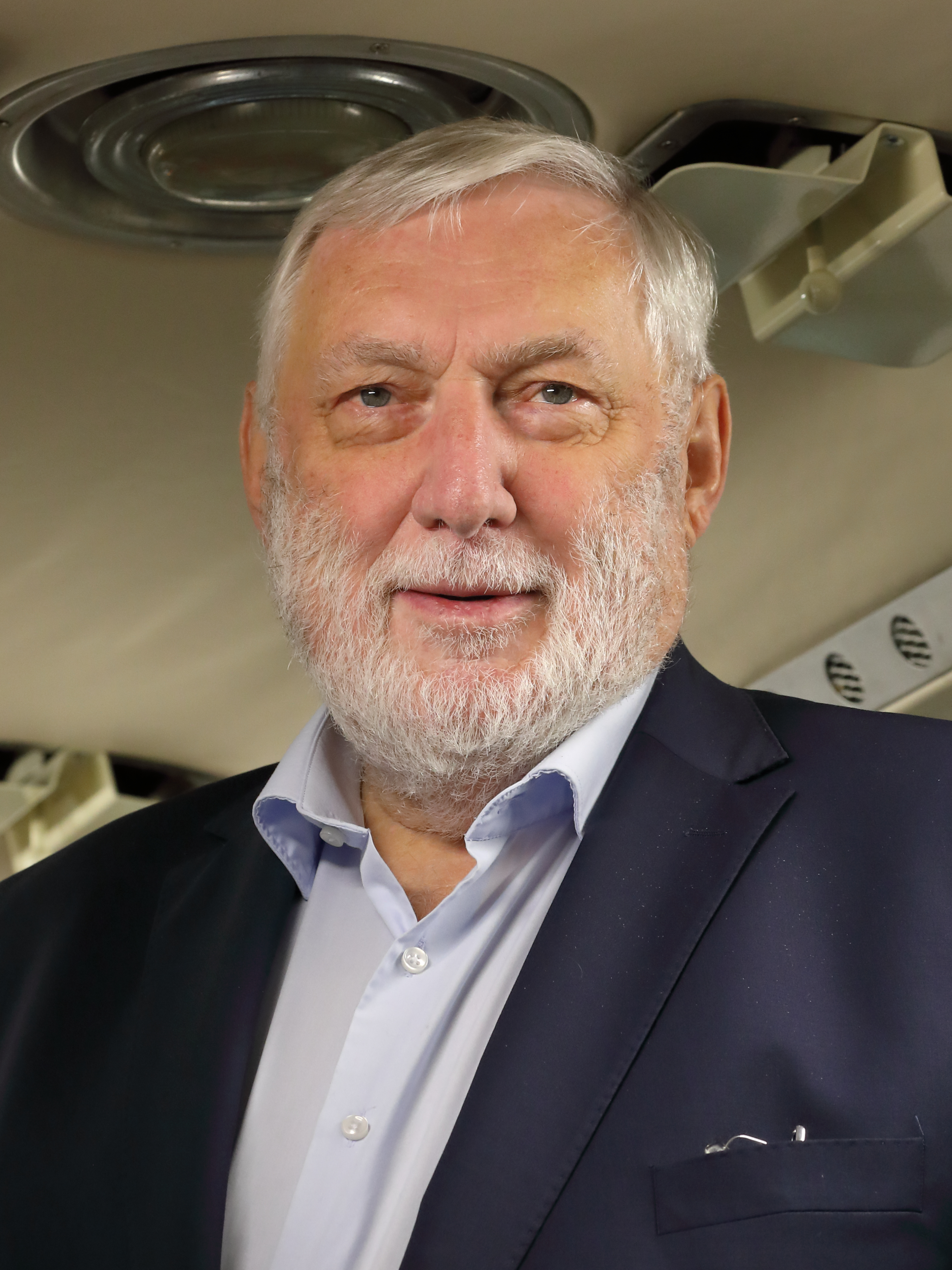
- Fischler in 2024

European Commission for Agriculture and Rural Development
- In office 1995–2004
- President: Jacques Santer; Romano Prodi
- Preceded by: René Steichen
- Succeeded by: Sandra Kalniete

Personal details
- Born: 23 September 1946 (age 80) Absam, Tyrol, Austria
- Party: Austrian People's Party
- Education: University of Natural Resources and Applied Life Sciences Vienna
- Occupation: Politician

Franz Fischler (born 23 September 1946) is an Austrian politician from the Austrian People's Party (ÖVP). He was the European Union's Commissioner for Agriculture, Rural Development and Fisheries (1995–2004). He also was President of the European Forum Alpbach.

Franz Fischler is married with Adelheid (Heidi) Hausmann in 1973. They have two sons, Klaus and Georg and two daughters, Bernadette and Ursula.

== Education and early career ==
Born in Absam, Tyrol Fischler studied agriculture at the University of Natural Resources and Applied Life Sciences Vienna, and finished as Dr rer.nat.oec. in 1978. He worked as University assistant from 1973 to 1979, then for the Tyrol Chamber of Agriculture, finally as its director from 1985 to 1989.

== Political career ==
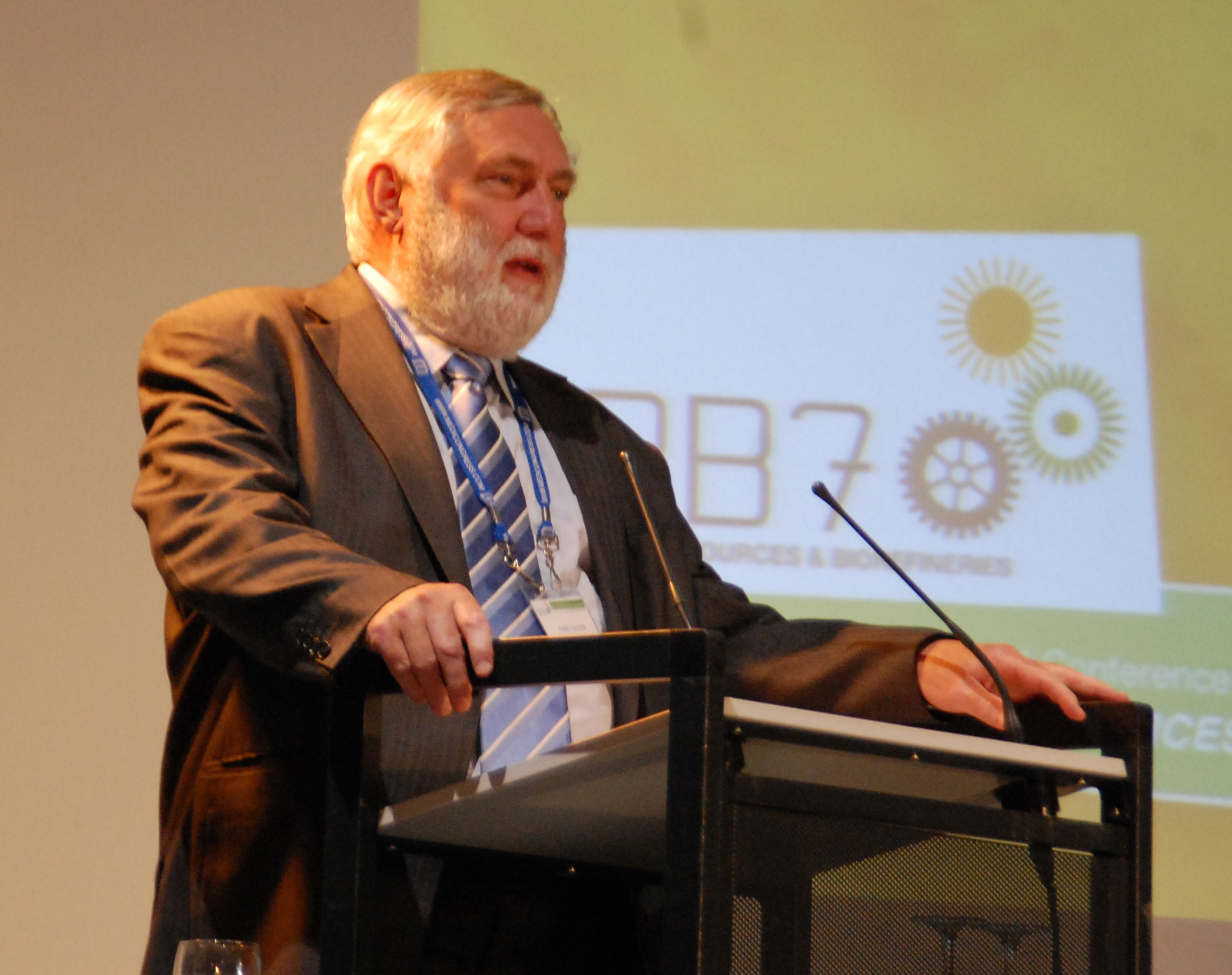
Fischler at the 7th International Conference on Renewable Resources & Biorefineries in 2011

Between 1989 and 1994 Fischler was Federal Minister for Agriculture and Forestry, and since 1990 elected Member of National Council. In 1995 he became European Commissioner in Brussels, responsible for agriculture and rural development. In 1999 fisheries also became part of his responsibilities.

At the 1999 Berlin summit, Fischler had significant influence on the Agenda 2000.

In 2011 Austria has decided to nominate Fischler as a candidate for the position of director general of FAO; the position went to José Graziano da Silva instead.

== Other activities ==
- Trilateral Commission, Member of the European Group.
- Institute for Advanced Studies (IHS), Chair of the Board of Trustees

== Notes and references ==
Political offices
Preceded by Josef Riegler	Agriculture Minister of Austria; 1989– 1994	Succeeded by Wilhelm Molterer
First	Austrian European Commissioner; 1995– 2004	Succeeded by Benita Ferrero-Waldner
