= Reconciliation of European Histories Group =

- Type: All-party group in the European Parliament
- Purpose: Promote public awareness of the crimes of totalitarian regimes at the EU level, develop cultural and educational projects, provide support for European and national research and education projects.
- Members: 40 MEPs
- Chair: Sandra Kalniete
- Parent organization: European Parliament

The Reconciliation of European Histories Group is an informal all-party group in the European Parliament involved in promoting the Prague Process in all of Europe, aimed at coming to terms with the totalitarian past in many countries of Europe. The group is chaired by former European Commissioner Sandra Kalniete and comprises members of the European People's Party, the Alliance of Liberals and Democrats, The Greens–European Free Alliance, the Progressive Alliance of Socialists and Democrats, Europe of Freedom and Democracy, and the European Conservatives and Reformists. As of 2011, the group had 40 members, including Sandra Kalniete, Hans-Gert Pöttering (Chairman of the Konrad Adenauer Foundation and former President of the European Parliament), László Tőkés (Vice President of the European Parliament), Heidi Hautala (former Chair of the Subcommittee on Human Rights), and Gunnar Hökmark (Chairman of the European Friends of Israel). The group has co-hosted a number of public hearings and other meetings in the European Parliament on totalitarianism and communist crimes in Eastern and Central Europe. The Reconciliation of European Histories Group also cooperates closely with the Working Group on the Platform of European Memory and Conscience.

According to historian Mano Toth, "in practice the informal group has become completely dominated by the agenda of the anti‐communist group" and subscribes to the theory that Nazi and Communist crimes are morally equivalent. Toth also states that most of the participants of the group are right-wing politicians from Eastern Europe who are known for anti-Communist stance.

== Members ==
- Bastiaan Belder, EFD
- Kinga Gál, PPE
- Cristina Gutierrez-Cortines, PPE
- Ágnes Hankiss, PPE
- Heidi Hautala, Greens/EFA
- Gunnar Hökmark, PPE
- Anneli Jäätteenmäki, ALDE
- Philippe Juvin, PPE
- Sandra Kalniete, PPE
- Arturs Krišjānis Kariņš, PPE
- Tunne Kelam, PPE
- Andrey Kovatchev, PPE
- Alain Lamassoure, PPE
- Vytautas Landsbergis, PPE
- Monica Luisa Macovei, PPE
- Iosif Matula, PPE
- Marek Migalski, ECR
- Radvilė Morkūnaitė, PPE
- Mariya Ivanova Nedelcheva, PPE
- Kristiina Ojuland, ALDE
- Ivari Padar, S&D
- Bernd Posselt, PPE
- Hans-Gert Pöttering, PPE
- Cristian Dan Preda, PPE
- Zuzana Roithová, PPE
- Jacek Saryusz-Wolski, PPE
- György Schöpflin, PPE
- Sógor Csaba, PPE
- Peter Šťastný, PPE
- Theodor Stolojan, PPE
- László Surján, PPE
- József Szájer, PPE
- Csaba Tabajdi, S&D
- László Tőkés, PPE
- Traian Ungureanu, PPE
- Viktor Uspaskich, ALDE
- Inese Vaidere, PPE
- Anna Záborská, PPE
- Paweł Zalewski, PPE
- Milan Zver, PPE
