= René Steichen =

Luxembourgish politician and jurist

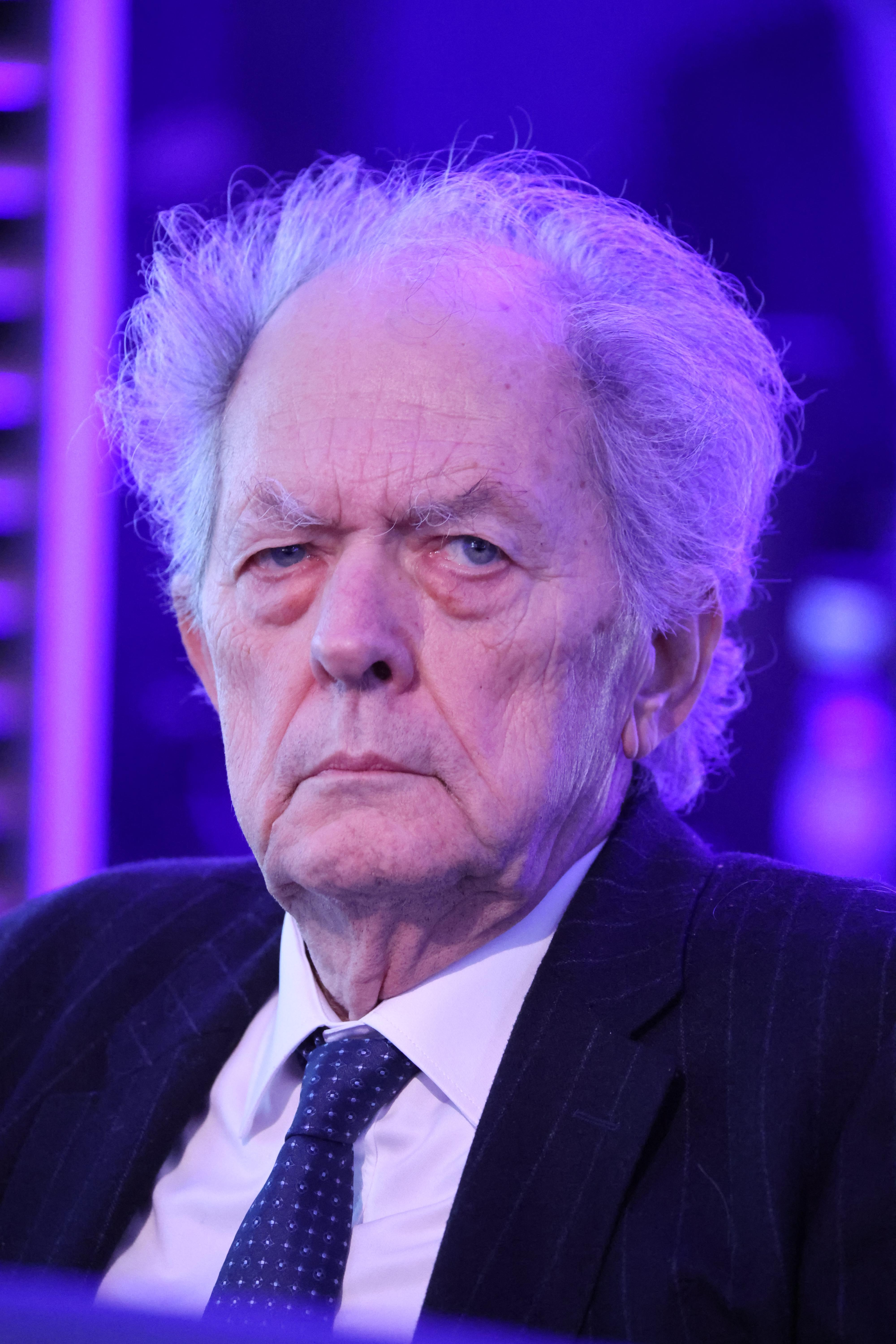
- Steichen in 2024

European Commission for Agriculture and Rural Development
- In office 1992–1995
- President: Jacques Delors
- Preceded by: Ray MacSharry
- Succeeded by: Franz Fischler

Personal details
- Born: 27 November 1942 (age 82)
- Political party: Christian Social People's Party

René Steichen (Luxembourgish: [ˈʃtɑɪ̯ɕən]; born 27 November 1942) is a Luxembourgish politician and jurist.

A member of the Christian Social People's Party (CSV), Steichen first held office as Mayor of Diekirch (1974–1984). He entered the Chamber of Deputies in 1979. In 1984, he entered the government as a Secretary of State, in which capacity he served until 1989, when he was promoted to Minister for Agriculture, Viticulture, and Rural Development. In 1992, he became Luxembourg's European Commissioner, responsible for Agriculture and Rural Development. Steichen remained in this capacity until 1995, when he was replaced as Luxembourg's European Commissioner by Jacques Santer, who was named President of the European Commission.

He has served as the chairman of SES, the world's largest satellite operator and the largest component of Luxembourg Stock Exchange's premier LuxX index.

Political offices
Preceded by Ray MacSharry	European Commissioner for Agriculture & Rural Development; 1992 – 1995	Succeeded by Franz Fischler
Preceded by Jean Dondelinger	Luxembourgish European Commissioner; 1992 – 1995	Succeeded by Jacques Santer
