= Indulis Bērziņš =

Latvian politician (born 1957)

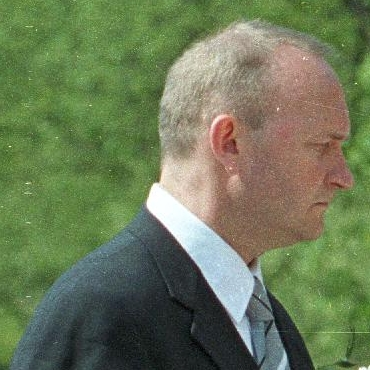
- Bērziņš in 2002

Minister of Foreign Affairs of Latvia
- In office 16 July 1999 – 7 November 2002
- President: Vaira Vīķe-Freiberga
- Prime Minister: Andris Šķēle
- Preceded by: Valdis Birkavs
- Succeeded by: Sandra Kalniete

Personal details
- Born: 4 December 1957 (age 68) Madona, Latvian SSR, Soviet Union
- Party: Popular Front of Latvia
- Other political affiliations: Latvian Way
- Education: University of Latvia
- Profession: Historian

Indulis Bērziņš (born 4 December 1957) is a Latvian historian and diplomat who served as Minister of Foreign Affairs of Latvia from 1999 to 2002.

== Biography ==
He was born in the town Madona.

In 1981, Indulis Bērziņš graduated with a degree in history from University of Latvia. From 1981 to 1990, he was a history lecturer at the University of Latvia and Latvian University of Agriculture. Bērziņš was an active member of the social political organization Popular Front of Latvia, and he was actively involved in the restoration of independence of the Republic of Latvia. As an elected member of the Supreme Council of the Republic of Latvia Bērziņš voted twice in favour of restoration of Latvia’s independence, on 4 May 1990 and 21 August 1991. From 1990 to 1999, he served as Member of Parliament representing Latvia’s Way political party. In his career as a Member of the Latvian Parliament (MP), Bērziņš has served in several key positions, including as Deputy Speaker of the Parliament, chairman of the Foreign Affairs Committee, head of the delegation to the North Atlantic Alliance, and head of the delegation to the Inter-Parliamentary Union.

From 16 July 1999 to 7 November 2002, Bērziņš was Latvia’s minister of foreign affairs. This period was of significant importance to Latvia in reaching several crucial milestones in the process of accession to the European Union and NATO. Bērziņš was Head of Delegation of Latvia to the EU accession. Since 2002, he has served as Ambassador Extraordinary and Plenipotentiary of the Republic of Latvia to the Kingdom of Denmark (2002-2003), the United Kingdom (2004-2009), and the Republic of Austria (2009-2013). In this period, he has served as Latvia’s non-residing ambassador to Australia, New Zealand, Switzerland, Liechtenstein and Slovenia. Beginning in September 2015, Bērziņš served as Ambassador Extraordinary and Plenipotentiary of the Republic of Latvia to NATO in Brussels, Belgium.

Bērziņš is Commander of the Three Stars Order of the Republic of Latvia and Grand Officer of the Cross of Recognition of the Republic of Latvia. In 1997, he was decorated as Commander of the Ordre National du Merit of France. In 2013, he received a Decoration of Honour for Services to the Republic of Austria.

Political offices
Preceded by Valdis Birkavs	Minister for Foreign Affairs of Latvia; 16 July 1999 – 7 November 2002	Succeeded by Sandra Kalniete
