= Georgs Andrejevs =

Latvian politician (1932–2022)

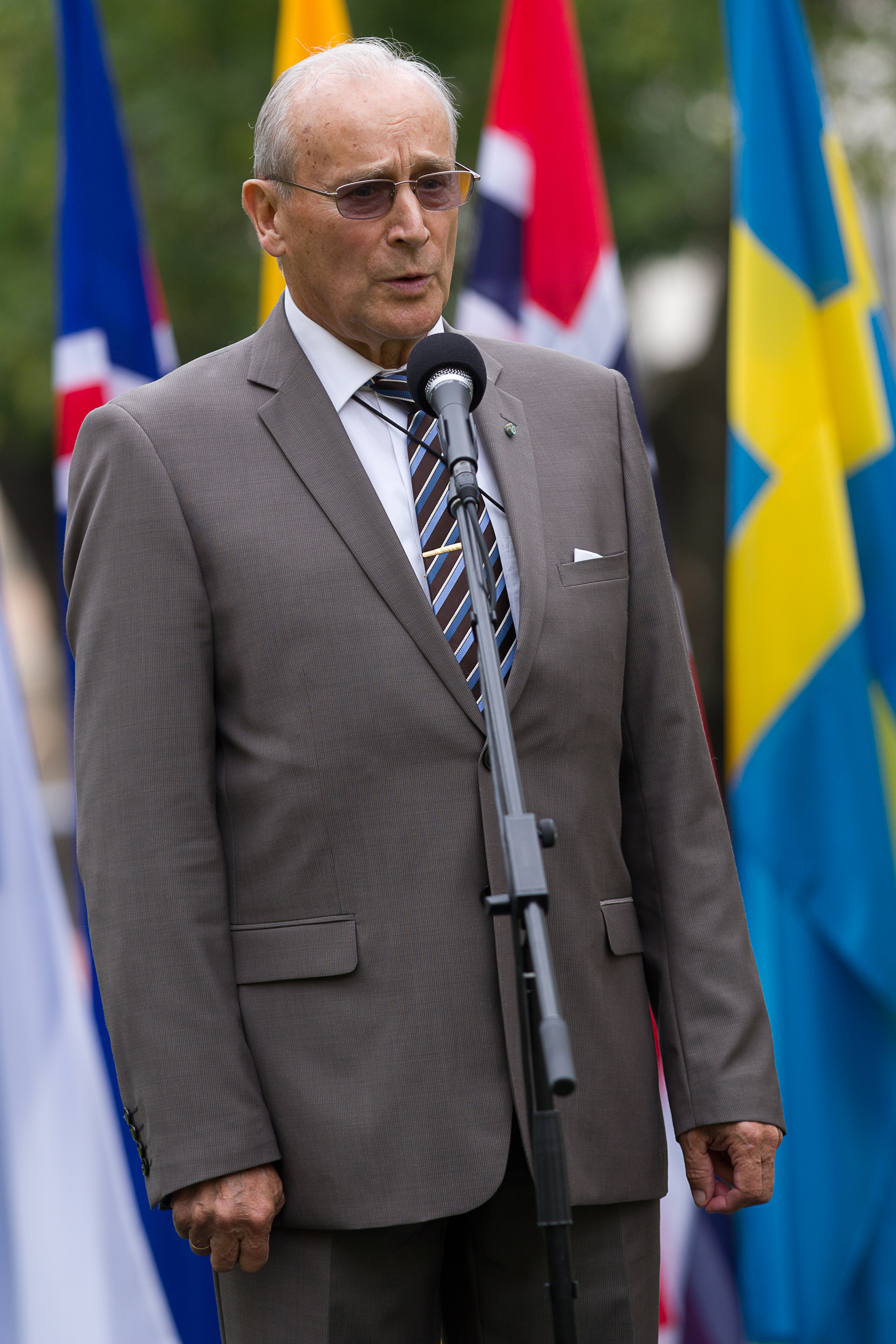
- Andrejevs in 2011

Member of the European Parliament
- In office 2004–2009
- Constituency: Latvia

Minister of Foreign Affairs of Latvia
- In office 10 November 1992 – 7 June 1994
- President: Guntis Ulmanis
- Prime Minister: Valdis Birkavs
- Preceded by: Jānis Jurkāns
- Succeeded by: Valdis Birkavs

Personal details
- Born: 30 October 1932
- Died: 16 July 2022 (aged 89) Riga, Latvia
- Party: Latvian Way
- Other political affiliations: ALDE

Georgs Andrejevs (30 October 1932 – 16 July 2022) was a Latvian politician and Member of the European Parliament for the Latvian Way party; part of the European Liberal Democrat and Reform Party. He was the Foreign Minister of Latvia from 1992 to 1994.

Andrejevs died on 16 July 2022 in Riga, Latvia at the age of 89.
