= European Network Remembrance and Solidarity =

European Network Remembrance and Solidarity (ENRS) was created in 2005 as a joint initiative by German, Hungarian, Polish, and Slovak ministers of culture. In 2014 Romania joined the structure.

The purpose of the ENRS is to document and promote the study of European 20th-century history and how it is remembered. Its fields of interest evolve around times of dictatorial regimes, wars, and resistance to oppression. The organization supports academic research, educational projects and promotional events, through a network of international scholars and ENRS partner institutions. All program decisions are made by assemblies, the ENRS' international supervisory bodies.

Since 2010, its projects are coordinated by the Secretariat of European Network Remembrance and Solidarity, which has its seat in Warsaw. From 2010 to 2014 the Secretariat was affiliated with Poland's National Centre for Culture. In early 2015, the Polish Minister of Culture and National Heritage, Professor Małgorzata Omilanowska appointed a new independent cultural institution called the Institute of European Network Remembrance and Solidarity.

== Activities & selected projects ==
ENRS implements its own projects, as well as supports, in terms of content and financing, actions of institutions, non-governmental organizations and research centers, which concentrate on memory studies. ENRS’ activities include: organizing conferences, symposiums e.g. European Remembrance Symposium, seminars and academic workshops; organizing events such as exhibitions, film screenings and reviews; publishing of academic works, scientific publications, and translated editions of existing books; supporting academic research; promoting study of history in media.

=== European Remembrance Symposium ===
The European Remembrance Symposium is an annual meeting organized by European Network Remembrance and Solidarity. Its goal is to exchange experiences and establish methods and forms of cooperation between institutions from different countries. Representatives of European historical institutions are invited to discuss the challenges facing Europe's idea of culture of remembrance and promotion of 20th-century history, with particular focus on Dictatorship. The first symposium took place in Gdańsk in 2012. Subsequent editions were organized in Berlin (2013), Prague (2014), Vienna (2015), Budapest (2016), Brussels (2017), and Bucharest (2018).

=== Genealogies of Memory in Central and Eastern Europe ===
The Genealogies of Memory programme was initiated by the ENRS in 2011, based on a concept developed by Dr Joanna Wawrzyniak and Dr Małgorzata Pakier. Its aim is to facilitate academic exchange among Central and Eastern European scholars by organizing annual international conferences and workshops.

=== In Between? ===
'In Between?' is an interdisciplinary educational project which began in April 2016. The participants, aged 18-26, conduct oral history research in the European borderlands. By the year 2018, 18 border regions had been visited.

In 2018, the 'In Between?' project received a special mention of the European Union Prize for Cultural Heritage / Europa Nostra Awards 2018.

== Assemblies of ENRS ==
=== Steering Committee ===
The Steering Committee is ENRS’s top decision-making body. Its members, ENRS coordinators, are appointed by member countries’ ministers of culture, or by their counterparts. Each member country is represented by one person. The Steering Committee makes decisions regarding ENRS’s strategy and projects.

Members:

- Prof. Jan Rydel, Poland (chairman of the Steering Committee)
- Réka Földváryné Kiss, Hungary
- Dr Andrea Kluknavská, Slovakia
- Prof. Matthias Weber, Germany
- Dr Florin Abraham, Romania

=== Advisory board ===
The Advisory Board draws its members from among representatives of the worlds of learning, culture, and politics in ENRS member countries and in countries that are not yet full members but are interested in participating. The board’s principal responsibilities are commenting on the overall directions of ENRS’s medium- and long-term development and representing the Network in its member countries and elsewhere.

Members:

- Markus Meckel, Germany (chairman of the Advisory Board)
- Ján Budaj, Slovakia
- Dr Stephan Eisel, Germany
- Prof. Josef Höchtl, Austria
- Prof. Gen. Mihail E. Ionescu, Romania
- Sandra Kalniete, Latvia
- Dr Zoltán Maruzsa, Hungary
- Robert Kostro, Poland
- Prof. Marcela Sălăgean, Romania
- Gentjana Sula, Albania
- Prof. László Szarka, Hungary
- Prof. Kazimierz Michał Ujazdowski, Poland

=== Academic Council ===
The Academic Council is made up of historians and social scientists. Its principal tasks include suggesting areas of ENRS research and research activities, reviewing proposals for scholarly projects, representing ENRS at conferences, congresses and scholarly meetings and evaluating ENRS’s scholarly activities.

Members:

- Prof. Attila Pók, Hungary (chairman of the Academic Council)
- Prof. Peter Haslinger, Germany
- Prof. Constantin Hlihor, Romania
- Viliam Jablonický, Slovakia
- Prof. Csaba Gy. Kiss, Hungary
- Prof. Róbert Letz, Slovakia
- Prof. Andrzej Nowak, Poland
- Prof. Dariusz Stola, Poland
- Acad. Răzvan Theodorescu, Romania
- Prof. Stefan Troebst, Germany
- Dr Oldřich Tůma, Czech Republic
