= Sandra Kalniete =

Latvian politician and author

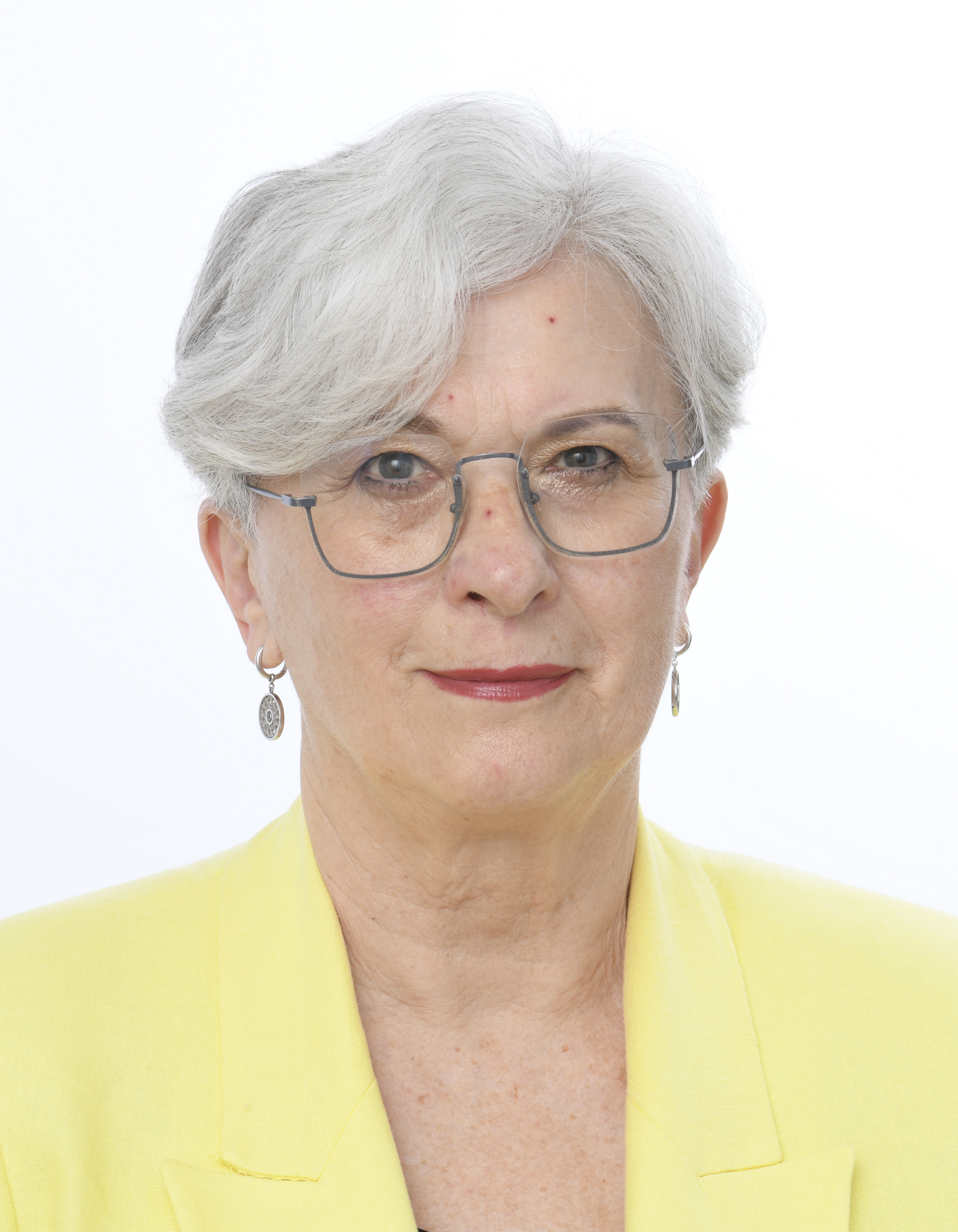
- Kalniete in 2024

Member of the European Parliament for Latvia
- Incumbent
- Assumed office 14 July 2009

European Commissioner for Agriculture and Fisheries
- In office 1 May 2004 – 11 November 2004
- President: Romano Prodi
- Preceded by: Franz Fischler
- Succeeded by: Mariann Fischer Boel (Agriculture and Rural Development); Joe Borg (Fisheries and Maritime Affairs)

Minister of Foreign Affairs
- In office 7 November 2002 – 9 March 2004
- Prime Minister: Einars Repše
- Preceded by: Indulis Bērziņš
- Succeeded by: Rihards Pīks

Personal details
- Born: 22 December 1952 (age 73) Togur, Tomsk Oblast, Russian SFSR, Soviet Union
- Party: Popular Front (Before 1993); New Era Party (2002–2008); Civic Union (2008–2011); Unity (2011–present)
- Education: Art Academy of Latvia; University of Leeds; University of Geneva
- Website: kalniete.lv
- Sandra Kalniete's voice Kalniete discussing the European Union Fisheries Fund and rural development Recorded 15 July 2004

Sandra Kalniete (born 22 December 1952) is a Latvian politician, author and diplomat. She served as Minister for Foreign Affairs of Latvia from 2002 to 2004 and as European Commissioner for Agriculture, Rural Development and Fisheries in 2004. Since 2009, she has served as Member of the European Parliament (MEP) for the European People's Party.

She is currently a member of the Committee on Foreign Affairs (AFET) and a substitute member of the Committee on Agriculture and Rural Development (AGRI). Additionally she is a member on the Delegation for relations with the countries of Southeast Asia and the Association of Southeast Asian Nations (ASEAN) and a substitute member on the Delegation to the EU-Ukraine Parliamentary Cooperation Committee and on the Delegation to the Euronest Parliamentary Assembly.

After her reelection in 2014, she became Vice-Chair of the Group of the European People's Party in the European Parliament.

Kalniete is also the chairperson of the Reconciliation of European Histories Group, an all-party group in the European Parliament involved in promoting the Prague Process. The group includes 40 MEPs from across the political spectrum including the European People's Party, the Alliance of Liberals and Democrats, the Greens, and the Progressive Alliance of Socialists and Democrats.

She has previously served as Ambassador to the United Nations (1993–97), France (1997–2000) and UNESCO (2000–02). Beside her native Latvian language, she is also fluent in English, French and Russian.

== Early life and education ==
Kalniete was born in Togur, in Tomsk Oblast, Russia, where her family had been deported by the NKVD during the country's occupation, for use as forced labour. Her mother Ligita Kalniete (née Dreifelde, 1926-2006) was first deported together with her mother and father in 1941, after which Ligita returned in 1948, before being deported again in 1949 as part of Operation Priboi. Her father Aivars Kalnietis (born 1931) was deported together with his mother in 1949 as well. Kalniete would remain in Russia until returning to Latvia at the age of five, when the family was allowed to return in 1957.

She studied art at the Latvian Academy of Art from 1977 to 1981 and worked as an art historian, publishing a book, Latvian Textile Art, in 1989.

== Early career ==
She entered politics in 1988, during Latvia's independence movement, and was a deputy chairwoman and one of the founders of Popular Front of Latvia, the main pro-independence political organization. Kalniete graduated from the Department of Art History and Art Theory at the Art Academy of Latvia (1981), the Institute for International Studies at the University of Leeds (1992), The Graduate Institute of International and Development Studies — now Geneva Graduate Institute — (1995), and has a Master of Arts from the Art Academy of Latvia (1996). The Geneva Graduate Institute later dedicated to her a place in its Hall of Inspiring Stories.

After Latvia declared independence, Kalniete worked in Latvia's Ministry of Foreign Affairs and served as Latvia's ambassador to the UN (from 1993 to 1997), France (from 1997 to 2000) and UNESCO (from 2000 to 2002).

== Political career ==
Kalniete became Foreign Minister of Latvia in November 2002 and served in this position until in 2004 when she was appointed the first Latvian Commissioner of the European Union in charge of Agriculture and Fisheries.

She was not re-nominated as Latvia's EU Commissioner.

At the beginning of 2006, Kalniete joined the New Era Party. In October 2006, she was elected to the Latvian parliament. She was the 2007 candidate of the New Era Party for the post of Latvian president, before withdrawing in favor of Aivars Endziņš on 24 May 2007.

Between 2006 and 2007, Kalniete served as member of the Amato Group, a group of high-level European politicians unofficially working on rewriting the Treaty establishing a Constitution for Europe into what became known as the Treaty of Lisbon following its rejection by French and Dutch voters.

In 2008, Kalniete announced she was leaving the New Era Party. She joined the newly founded Civic Union and became the party's leader. In the 2009 European Parliament election she was elected as a Member of the European Parliament and reelected in the 2014 European Parliament election in Latvia. She put herself forward as a potential candidate to succeed Andris Bērziņš as President of Latvia after his decision to step down in 2015.

She was reelected as a Member of the European Parliament and in the 2019 European Parliament election in Latvia.

She was mentioned as a possible candidate for the 2023 Latvian presidential election.

She was reelected once again as a Member of the European Parliament and in the 2024 European Parliament election in Latvia.

== Human rights activism ==
Kalniete is involved in many human rights causes pertaining to totalitarian crimes. She is the chair of the Reconciliation of European Histories Group, an all-party group in the European Parliament aimed at coming to terms with the totalitarian past in many countries of Europe.

In 2004, she argued that "behind the Iron Curtain the Soviet regime continued to commit genocide against the peoples of Eastern Europe and, indeed, against its own people [...] the two totalitarian regimes—Nazism and Communism—were equally criminal." She elaborated on this in 2006 when she came up with death counts for the two regimes, pointing out that the Soviet Union killed around 94.5 million people.

== Publications ==
She is an author of four books:

- Latviešu tekstilmāksla (Latvian Textile Art), 1989.
- Es lauzu, tu lauzi, mēs lauzām. Viņi lūza (I Broke, You Broke, We Broke. They Fell Apart), a book about Latvia's independence movement, published in 2000.
- Ar balles kurpēm Sibīrijas sniegos (With Dancing Shoes in Siberian Snows), a book about the deportation of her family to Siberia during the Joseph Stalin era and her family's efforts to return to their home country, first published in 2001.
- "Prjaņiks. Debesmannā. Tiramisū." (Pryanik. Semolina mousse. Tiramisu), Rīga, Zelta grauds, 2012.

The French translation of With Dancing Shoes in Siberian Snows published in 2003 by Editions des Syrtes as En escarpins dans les neiges de Sibérie was nominated for the Documentary Book of the Month for December by the readers of Elle magazine. Since its publishing it has been translated into more than ten languages.

== Translations ==
The book Ar balles kurpēm Sibīrijas sniegos, Riga, Latvia: Atēna, 2001 (ISBN 9984-635-78-3) has been translated into several languages:

- Albanian: "Këpucë balerine mbi dëborën siberiane". Transl.: Durim Taçe. Skopje, Macedonia: Shkupi (2010). ISBN 978-608-216-022-1
- French: En escarpins dans les neiges de Sibérie. Transl.: Velta Skujina. Paris, France: Editions des Syrtes, 2003. ISBN 2-84545-079-6
- German: Mit Ballschuhen im sibirischen Schnee. Transl.: Matthias Knoll. München, Germany: Herbig Verlag, 2005. ISBN 3-7766-2424-8
- Italian: Scarpette da ballo nelle nevi di Siberia. Transl.: G. Weiss. Milano, Italy: Libri Scheiwiller, 2005. ISBN 88-7644-445-9
- Japanese: Dansu shûzu de yuki no Shiberia e. Transl.: Ayumi Kurosawa. Tôkyô: Shinhyôron, 2014. ISBN 978-4-7948-0947-6
- Czech: V plesových střevíčkách sibiřským sněhem. Transl.: Michal Škrabal. Praha, Czech Republic: Lubor Kasal, 2005. ISBN 80-903465-5-3
- Swedish: Med högklackade skor i Sibiriens snö. Transl.: Juris Kronbergs. Stockholm, Sweden: Atlantis, 2005. ISBN 91-7353-066-2
- English: With Dance Shoes in Siberian Snows. Transl.: Margita Gailītis. Riga, Latvia: The Latvian Occupation Museum Association, 2006. ISBN 9984-9613-7-0
- Russian: В бальных туфельках по сибирским снегам. Riga, Latvia: Atēna, 2006. ISBN 9984-34-183-6
- Finnish: Tanssikengissä Siperiaan. Transl.: Hilkka Koskela. Helsinki, Finland: Werner Söderström Osakeyhtiö, 2007. ISBN 978-951-0-32096-9
- Dutch: Op dansschoenen in de Siberische sneeuw. Transl.: Marijke Koekoek. Amsterdam: Uitgeverij van Gennep, 2006. ISBN 978-90-5515-702-0
- Arabic: Cairo, Egypt: Sphinx Agency for Arts and Literature, 2009.
- Spanish: Con zapatos de fiesta en las nieves de Siberia. Transl.: Jānis Kleinbergs; text editor: María Maestro; iluustrator: Agnese Čemme, Lasītava, 2019
- Tamil: ஸைபீரியப் பனியில் நடனக் காலணியுடன். Transl: C. S. Lakshmi (Ambai), Kalachuvadu Publications, 2019. ISBN 978-93-8982-065-2

Hungarian: Báli cipőben Szibériába, Transl. Béla Jávorszky, Magyar Napló Kiadó, Budapest,2021, ISBN 978-963-541-041-5

== Career experience and political activities ==
- June 2014 – Member of the European Parliament (Committee on Foreign Affairs, Agricultural un Rural Development committee)
- June 2009 – Member of the European Parliament (Internal Market and Consumer Protection committee, Agricultural un Rural Development committee, Women's Rights and Gender Equality committee)
- April 2008 – Leader of the "Civic Union" party
- January 2008 – Left party "New Era"
- October 2006 – Member of Parliament of Republic of Latvia (Foreign Affairs commission and European Affairs commission)
- January 2006 – Member of right conservative party "New Era"
- March 2005 – Ambassador, Special Adviser to EU Commissioner for Energy
- March 2005 – Member of the Board of Trustees of the independent think tank Friends of Europe, Member of Editorial Board of Europe's World
- December 2004 – Member of the Administrative Board of Robert Schuman Fondation (France)
- 1 May – 20 November 2004 – the European Commissioner
- 7 November 2002 – 9 March 2004 – Minister of Foreign Affairs
- 2000 – 2002 Ambassador Extraordinary and Plenipotentiary and Permanent Representative of the Republic of Latvia to UNESCO
- 1997 – 2002 Ambassador Extraordinary and Plenipotentiary of the Republic of Latvia to France
- 1993 – 1997 Ambassador Extraordinary and Plenipotentiary of the Republic of Latvia to the United Nations in Geneva
- 1990 – 1993 Ministry of Foreign Affairs: Chief of Protocol, Deputy Foreign Minister
- 1988 – 1990 Latvian Popular Front (LPF): General Secretary of the LPF Coordinating Council, Deputy Chairman
- 1987 – 1988 Latvian Artists' Union: General Secretary

== Awards ==
- 1995 – Commander of the Order of the Three Stars (Latvia)
- 2000 – Cabinet of Ministers Award (Latvia)
- 2001 – Commander of the Legion of Honor (France)
- 2002 – Commander of the Ordre des Palmes académiques (France)
- 2004 – Commander's Grand Cross of the Order of the Lithuanian Grand Duke Gediminas (Lithuania)
- 2005 – Commander of the Great Cross of the Cross of Recognition (Latvia)
- 2009 – Order "Mérite Européen" in Gold (Fondation du Mérite Européen, Luxembourg): for promoting a stronger and more united Europe
- 2009 – Medal of the Baltic Assembly: for organizing and coordinating the Baltic Way manifestation, for developing and strengthening unity among the Baltic Nations, and for the support and work lent to the people of the Baltic Nations
- 2012 – Order of the Cross of Terra Mariana, 2nd degree (Estonia)
- 2018 – Truman-Reagan Medal of Freedom
- 2020 – Order of Princess Olga, 1st Class (Ukraine)

== Board-member/affiliations ==
- La Fondation pour l’innovation politique
- Rural Investment Support for Europe (RISE) Foundation
- Friends of Europe
- Fondation Robert-Schuman
- Koknese Fund (Kokneses Fonds)
- Notre Europe
- European Movement – Latvia
- Baltic - Black Sea Alliance (Baltijas-Melnās jūras alianse)
- Board of the Friends of EUROCLIO Foundation
- Advisory board member of the European Network Remembrance and Solidarity

Political offices
Preceded by Indulis Bērziņš	Minister of Foreign Affairs; 2002–2004	Succeeded by Rihards Pīks
New office	Latvian European Commissioner; 2004	Succeeded by Andris Piebalgs
Preceded by Franz Fischler	European Commissioner for Agriculture and Fisheries; 2004; Served alongside: Franz Fischler	Succeeded by Mariann Fischer Boel as European Commissioner for Agriculture and Rural Development
Preceded by Franz Fischler	European Commissioner for Agriculture and Fisheries; 2004; Served alongside: Franz Fischler	Succeeded by Joe Borg as European Commissioner for Fisheries and Maritime Affairs
Party political offices
New office	Leader of the Civic Union; 2008–2011	Position abolished
