= David Angell (diplomat) =

Canadian diplomat

Permanent Representative of Canada to NATO
- In office 12 February 2019 – 24 September 2024
- Succeeded by: Heidi Hulan

Ambassador to Kenya
- In office 2012–2016

Personal details
- Born: Canada

David Jonathan Robin Angell is a Canadian diplomat, currently serving as the Foreign and Defence Policy Advisor to the Prime Minister. He was the Canadian ambassador to NATO from 2019 to 2024. He was the Canadian High Commissioner to Kenya from 2012 until 2016, cross-posted as High Commissioner to Rwanda and Uganda; as Ambassador designate to Burundi, Somalia and South Sudan, and as Canada's representative to the United Nations Environment Program (UNEP) and the United Nations Human Settlements Programme (UN-Habitat) in Nairobi.

== Education ==
- BA, Political Science, Yale University, 1986
- MA, International Relations, University of Toronto, 1987
- MPhil, International Relations, University of Cambridge [Commonwealth Scholar], 1988

== Career ==
Angell joined External Affairs and International Trade Canada in 1989. He was posted to Washington, D.C. from 1991 to 1993. From 1995 to 1996, he was posted to Northern Ireland to act as adviser to Gen. John de Chastelain in the peace process there. From 1996 to 2001, he worked at the Permanent Mission to the United Nations in New York (1996 to 2001), From 2004 to 2012, he was High Commissioner in Nigeria. During that time, from 2004 to 2007, he was also Ambassador to the Economic Community of West African States. He has also been Director General for the International Organizations of the Canadian Foreign Affairs and International Trade.

Angell has served in the following Head of Mission posts:

- Permanent Representative to the North Atlantic Treaty Organization (2019 - 2024)
- High Commissioner to Kenya (2012 - 2016)
- High Commissioner to Rwanda (2012 - 2016)
- High Commissioner to Uganda (2012 - 2016)
- Ambassador to Somalia (2012 - 2016)
- Ambassador to Burundi (2012 - 2016)
- Ambassador to South Sudan (2012 - 2016)
- Permanent Representative to the United Nations Environmental Programme (2012 - 2016)
- High Commissioner to Nigeria (2004 - 2012)
- Permanent Representative to the Economic Community of West African States (2004 - 2007)

Angell is a recipient of the Queen Elizabeth II Diamond Jubilee Medal (2013).

In March 2014, along with the High Commissioners from Australia and the UK, and Ambassadors from the EU and several other countries, he co-signed, in his capacity of Canadian High Commissioner to Uganda, a "Statement From European Union Diplomats On The Anti-Homosexuality Law" expressing concern and disappointment over Uganda's Anti-Homosexuality Bill.

In May 2022, while the Russian invasion of Ukraine raged, Angell spearheaded the Canadian diplomatic push for a NATO Climate Change and Security Centre of Excellence, a signature policy of Minister of National Defence Anita Anand.

In March 2025, Angell was appointed Foreign and Defence Policy Advisor to the Prime Minister at the Privy Council Office.

== Personal ==
David grew up in Westmount, Montreal, Quebec, the son of Sylvia and Harold Angell. He married Katherine Mary (Kate) Raybould in October 1990; they have two children, Alexandra and Jonathan.

Diplomatic posts
Preceded by Howard Strauss	Ambassador Extraordinary and Plenipotentiary to Nigeria; 2004-2012	Succeeded by Perry Calderwood
