= Rihards Pīks =

Latvian politician and film director (1941–2026)

- Official portrait, 2004

Minister of Foreign Affairs
- In office 9 March 2004 – 19 July 2004
- Preceded by: Sandra Kalniete
- Succeeded by: Artis Pabriks

Member of the European Parliament for Latvia
- In office 20 July 2004 – 13 July 2009

Personal details
- Born: 31 December 1941 Riga, Reichskommissariat Ostland
- Died: 7 September 2026 (aged 84) Riga, Latvia
- Party: Latvian; TP; EU; EPP

Rihards Pīks (31 December 1941 – 7 September 2026) was a Latvian politician and film director. He was a Member of the European Parliament for the People's Party; part of the European People's Party. He served as the Foreign Minister of Latvia in 2004.

== Life and career ==
Pīks was born in Riga on 31 December 1941.

He was a Member of the European Parliament from 2004 to 2009 for the People's Party; part of the European People's Party. He served as the Foreign Minister of Latvia in 2004. He also served as a member of the Saeima from 1998 until 2004.

Pīks died in Riga on 7 September 2026, at the age of 84.
