= Ministry of Foreign Affairs (Latvia) =

Government ministry of Latvia

Coordinates: 56.954427°N 24.107876°E

Republic of Latvia Ministry of Foreign Affairs
- Latvijas Republikas Ārlietu ministrija
- Coat of arms of Latvia

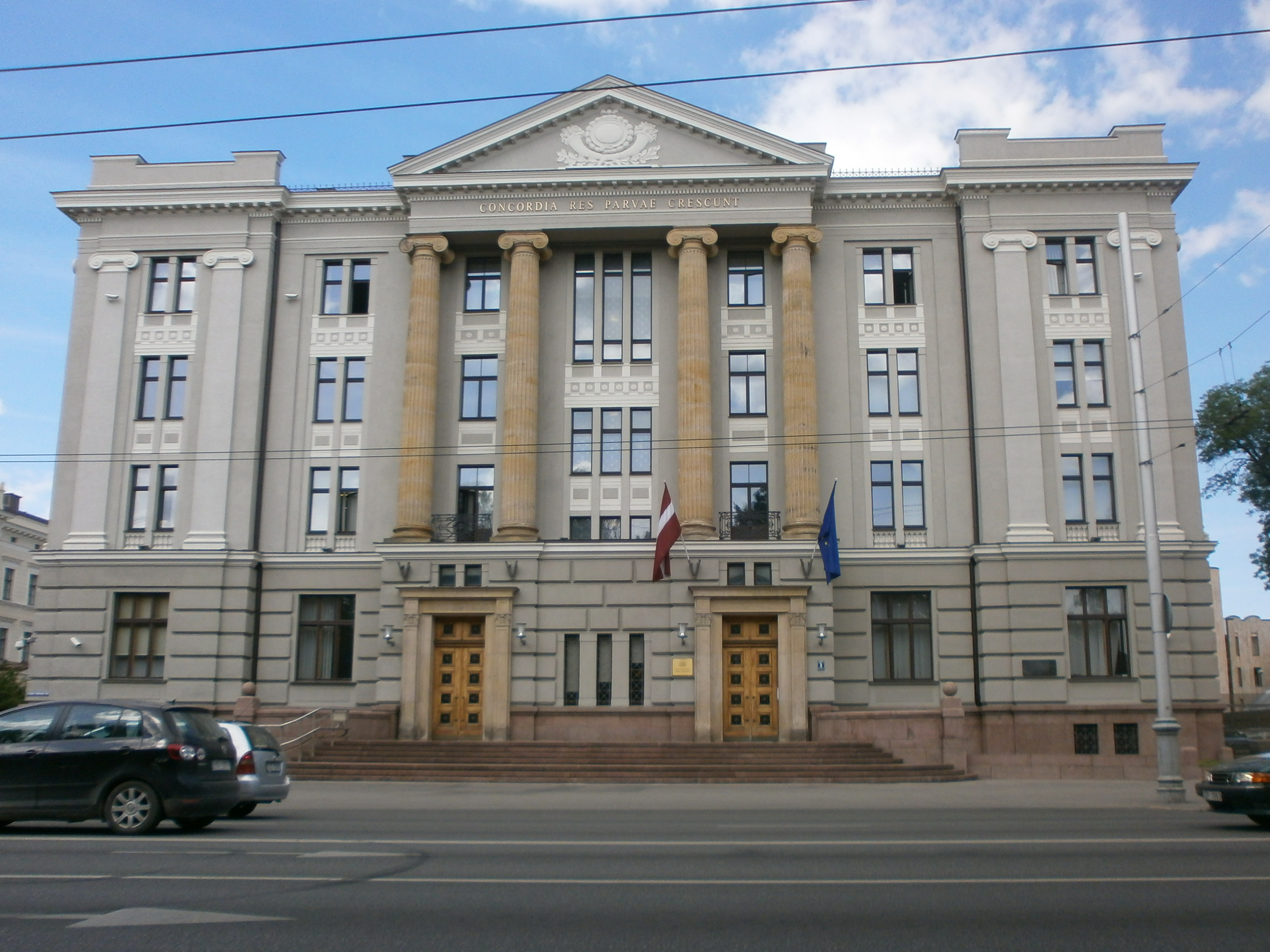
- Latvian Ministry of Foreign Affairs, Riga

Agency overview
- Formed: 1918 (Suspended operations between 1940 and 1991, though not in UK, USA and Sweden)
- Jurisdiction: Government of Latvia
- Headquarters: K. Valdemara street 3, Riga
- Agency executives: Baiba Braže, Minister of Foreign Affairs; Andžejs Viļumsons, State Secretary; Artjoms Uršuļskis, Parliamentary Secretary
- Child agency: Latvijas Institūts
- Website: www.mfa.gov.lv

The Ministry of Foreign Affairs (Latvian: Latvijas Republikas Ārlietu ministrija) is responsible for maintaining the Republic of Latvia's external relations and the management of its international diplomatic missions. The current Minister of Foreign Affairs is Baiba Braže.

== Diplomacy ==
The ministry directs Latvia's affairs with foreign entities, including bilateral relations with individual nations and its representation in international organizations, including the United Nations, European Union, Council of Europe, NATO, the Organization for Security and Co-operation in Europe, the International Monetary Fund, the World Trade Organization, and its participation in the Schengen Area. It oversees visas, cooperation with expatriates, international human rights policy, transatlantic defense policy and various global trade concerns. The ministry also contributes to Latvia's international trade and economic development, in collaboration with the Ministry of Economics (Latvia) and the Investment and Development Agency of Latvia.

== Inspector General ==
The Inspector General for the Ministry of Foreign Affairs of Latvia is appointed by the Minister of Foreign Affairs. The current Inspector General for the Ministry of Foreign Affairs of Latvia is Normans Penke.

Inspector General	Dates served
Indulis Bērziņš	2013 – 2015
Māris Riekstiņš	2015 – 2017
Normans Penke	2017 – Incumbent

== List of ministers ==
- Jānis Jurkāns (22 May 1990 – 10 November 1992)
- Georgs Andrejevs (10 November 1992 – 7 June 1994)
- Valdis Birkavs (19 September 1994 – 6 July 1999)
- Indulis Bērziņš (16 July 1999 – 7 November 2002)
- Sandra Kalniete (7 November 2002 – 9 March 2004)
- Rihards Pīks (9 March 2004 – 19 July 2004)
- Artis Pabriks (21 July 2004 – 28 October 2007)
- Māris Riekstiņš (8 November 2007 – 28 April 2010)
- Aivis Ronis (29 April 2010 – 3 November 2010)
- Ģirts Valdis Kristovskis (3 November 2010 – 25 October 2011)
- Edgars Rinkēvičs (25 October 2011 – 8 July 2023)
- Krišjānis Kariņš (8 July 2023 – 10 April 2024)
- Baiba Braže (19 April 2024 – present)

== See also ==
- Foreign relations of Latvia
- List of diplomatic missions of Latvia
