= New musick =

Music genre and series of articles by Sounds magazine

- Sounds magazine's front cover of "New Musick" issue published in November 1977.
- Stylistic origins: Krautrock; experimental rock; kosmische Musik; electronic; punk rock; reggae; art rock; glam rock; disco; jazz; dub
- Cultural origins: c. 1977, United Kingdom, United States and Germany
- Derivative forms: Post-punk; cold wave

Other topics
- Punk-funk; industrial; new wave; power pop; synth-pop; motorik; minimal wave; New Romantic; progressive rock; art punk; new pop; gothic rock; no wave; garage rock; post-disco; mutant disco

New musick is a loosely defined style of music and series of articles published in the late 1970s by the British magazine Sounds. New musick was originally coined after a meeting organized by Sounds editor Alan Lewis involving music journalists Jane Suck, Sandy Robertson and Jon Savage in October 1977. The meeting resulted in the group deciding to use "New Musick" as a marketing term for issues in November and December 1977, similar to "new wave", which had previously been used for a series of Sounds articles entitled "Images of the New Wave". The term has been described by Savage as an early label for "post-punk" as well as a subsection of the genre.

New musick was used as a term to describe several experimental, avant-garde and progressive developments being made in punk rock. Drawing influences from disco, dub, reggae, krautrock and electronic music, particularly the use of synthesizers. In November 1977, Sounds published their first issue on new musick which included editorials by Jane Suck and Jon Savage. Writers Simon Reynolds, David Buckley, David Wilkinson, Mimi Haddon and Theo Cateforis retrospectively cited Savage's editorial as the starting point for "post-punk" as a musical genre. The editorial was followed by several new musick articles by other Sounds writers, including Suck, Robertson, Vivien Goldman, Davitt Sigerson, Dave Fudger and Steven Lavers.

The British press quickly adopted the label which sparked ideological conflicts among music critics and the British punk scene regarding new musick undermining the authenticity of the punk ideology. Much of the pushback was rooted in the strong hostility the punk scene held toward electronic music, disco, art and progressive rock, resulting in the scene fracturing into several distinct categories such as "power pop", "mod renewal", "futurist", and "new punk" (or "real punk"). By the end of the decade, new musick was replaced by "new wave" and "post-punk" interchangeably in the UK.

== Etymology ==
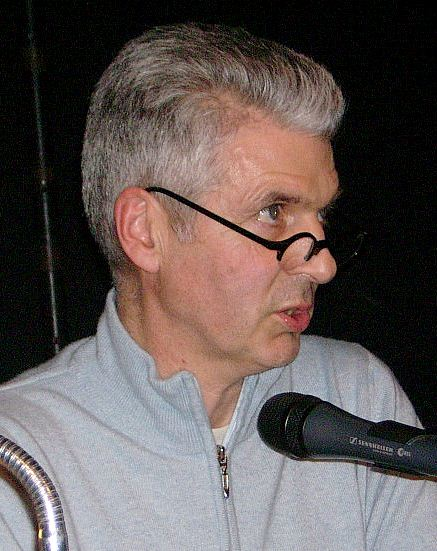
Jon Savage's 1977 Sounds editorial "New Musick" outlined a new experimental direction in punk.

On 26 November 1977, Sounds magazine published an issue entitled "New Musick", the front cover was done by Steven Lavers with editorials by music journalists Jane Suck and Jon Savage. Savage wrote a piece on an emerging scene and style of music known as "new musick", suggesting that punk rock was becoming stagnant and evolving into new, more experimental forms, which he noted as "post punk projections". His editorial stated "New Musick is too many cigarettes, too much depression and too little heart." Savage then remarked:

It probably all began with Jazz or in the BBC Workshop, but I prefer to think it all stemmed from the mesmerising Farfisa organ sound of ? and the Mysterians '96 Tears'. 'That' was pure heartbreak, 'this' — Kraftwerk, Bowie, Eno, Space — is hearts stuck together with sellotape. It's the white equivalent of dub (obligatory hallucogenic reggae record: Althea & Donna's 'Up Town Top Ranking')

Furthermore, this music’s purportedly “ice cold” character, and [Simon] Reynolds’ references to technology evoke the imagined bleakness that lay beyond the Iron Curtain, and reinforces stereotypes about people from Germany and their alleged rigid, robotic disposition. This would also explain the inclusion of the German group Kraftwerk in Savage’s New Musick editorial, alongside Throbbing Gristle and Siouxsie and the Banshees, who were both from the UK. The Nazi iconography used by Siouxsie and the Banshees in particular may too have justified Savage’s decision to include them in the New Musick section.

— Mimi Haddon (March 30, 2020)

He described the style as exhibiting "more overt reggae/dub influence", sounding "the same/manufactured in a factory," and characterized Subway Sect, the Prefects, Siouxsie and the Banshees, the Slits, and Wire as exploring "harsh urban scrapings/controlled white noise/massively accented drumming". He mentioned acts such as Pere Ubu, Throbbing Gristle and Devo, and stated new musick to be thought of as "texture". He clarified "[new] musick isn't muzak", while citing Robert Fripp and Brian Eno's "Swastika Girls" (1973). The Velvet Underground along with Lou Reed, John Cale and Nico were noted as precursors and influences accompanied by a verse from "Gideon's Bible" (1970). He described the movement as "Clean teen beat groups cleaning up and minting millions from where the Groovies' left off and starting where the Jam got boring. Synthemesc nouveau pop".

Music journalists Simon Reynolds, David Buckley, David Wilkinson, and Theo Cateforis retrospectively cited Savage's editorial as the starting point for post-punk as a musical genre. During the late 1970s, the terms "new musick", "new wave" and "post-punk" would all be used interchangeably by British music publications. Additionally, the subgenre "cold wave" would also be coined in the November 1977 Sounds "New Musick" article, with members of Kraftwerk, Ralf Hütter and Florian Schneider, being displayed on the front cover.

Writer Mimi Haddon suggested the term "New Musick" may have referred to the division of Germany into East and West and that the emphasis on "all things German in opposition to “American and rock ‘n’ roll,” that Reynolds identifies may also have inspired the quasi-Germanic spelling of “Musick,” which resembles the German word Musik, as well as the quasi-Germanic capitalization of the words."

== Characteristics and influences ==
=== Musical style ===
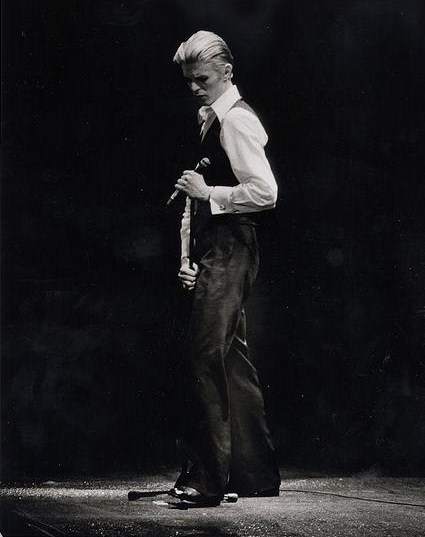
David Bowie performing as "The Thin White Duke" at Maple Leaf Gardens, Toronto, 26 February 1976

Music critic Simon Reynolds regarded "new musick" as denoting its own musical style, which he defined as the "industrial/dystopian science-fiction side of post-punk". While Savage suggested new musick could be thought of as a subsection of post-punk. Writer Matthew Worley labelled new musick a soundtrack to "the transition from mid-1970s anger to late '70s alienation". Mimi Haddon describes the term as encompassing the early British punk scene’s interest in Europe along with contemporary German music genres and aesthetics, stating:

New Musick in 1977, then, seems to have signified a messy, slightly xenophobic amalgam of the Third Reich, Eastern Bloc chic and Kosmische Musik, united under an image of clichéd Germanic severity, austerity, and technophilia. Importantly, some of the kinds of associations conjured by the term New Musick have endured and become part of post-punk’s often unspoken criteria, especially those of coldness, harshness, and darkness.

New musick is primarily defined by an emphasis on electronic music, particularly the use of synthesizers. Along with influences lifted from krautrock, kosmische Musik, reggae, dub and disco, as well as Giorgio Moroder, David Bowie's Berlin Trilogy and Brian Eno's solo albums, both artists who would briefly be labelled "new musick". Buckley stated new musick was "the first wave of music influenced by Kraftwerk", and regarded "The Model" as being "New Musick, music for a post-industrial computer age, music for the future".

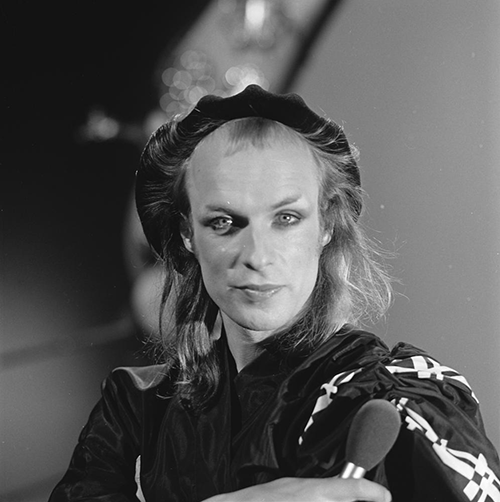
Brian Eno on AVRO's television program TopPop, April 1974

Writers Sean Albiez and David Pattie stated new musick encompassed "the experimenters, avant-garde stylists and post-punk progressives", as well as "Despite the undoubted physicality and emotional content of many New Musick artists, Sounds presented its chosen artists as somehow 'colder' than punk". The style was primarily characterized by "cold" and "bleakness". In January 1978, Kris Needs of ZigZag magazine interviewed Brian Eno and noted "this new Ice Cold Music of the Future craze in Sounds" to describe his music, Eno replied:

I know. I didn't agree with that. I didn't think it was ice cold [laughs]. You see, it doesn't derive from that bluesy feel, and people are so used to that, you know, the whole tradition of The Stones, that kind of it's-all-felt kind of movement, and I don't drive from that very much but nonetheless I don't think that what results is therefore cold, it doesn't have that particular kind of warmth...

Needs would state "Bowie's lumped in it too, and you've linked with Bowie after the last two albums..." (referring to the Berlin Trilogy), with Eno replying "Yes, I'm a bit fed up of it... I'm a bit annoyed at the moment, well not annoyed, just... I'm fed up with myself a bit, that's what it is really." In his 2014 book, Future Days: Krautrock and the Birth of a Revolutionary New Music, writer David Stubbs states:

The New Musick was the stirring of a new aesthetic, a new pop ice age, drawing on the activities of groups who had been around for a few years, such as Kraftwerk and Can in Germany and Throbbing Gristle and Cabaret Voltaire in the UK. It also prefigured groups who were only just coming into being, such as Joy Division, who were still at that point barely out of their punk nappies, still trading Warsaw that year

Stubbs further cites David Bowie as "the precursor of all this".

== History ==
=== Origins ===
Around the summer of 1977, according to Simon Reynolds, "punk had become a parody of itself". By October, writers and editors at Sounds echoed similar sentiments, with Savage noting the release of the Sex Pistols' "Holidays in the Sun" signaled that the "death knells were already there", he stated: "We came up with this idea of doing a couple of issues of Sounds around tribal electronic synthetic cut-up music. I think Vivien Goldman had a lot to do with it, and so did Dave Fudger, who were both senior editors on Sounds at the time". Savage stated, "July/August 1977 was exactly the point when UK punk became over-exposed, assimilated and superseded in real time, so the New Musick issue was an important step in our recognition". He remarked:

In late October, Sounds editor Alan Lewis brought Sandy, Jane and myself into a meeting [...] The result was 'New Musick', two weeks of features at the end of October and the beginning of November 1977. Vivien Goldman wrote about Siouxsie and dub reggae. Davitt Sigerson wrote about disco. Steven Lavers wrote about Kraftwerk. Sandy wrote about Throbbing Gristle. Jane and I wrote the editorials, and I cobbled together a couple of short articles about Devo and The Residents, mostly taken from Search And Destroy.

Savage stated Lewis had requested them to come up with an "Images of the New Wave" part 3, which had been a previous series of Sounds articles that used the term "new wave" as a marketing trend. He cited "Magic Fly" by Space (1977) and "I Feel Love" by Donna Summer (produced by Giorgio Moroder and Pete Bellotte) as singles both him and Jane Suck were "obsessed" with. He stated they "made all of us punk rock snobs say 'Oh, my god, disco is fantastic', you know, electronics are the way forward". Savage noted that "punk was old hat" and Sounds writers collectively came up with the idea to celebrate "the new electronic and futuristic music that seemed much more interesting than old pub rockers banging out three chords".

In September 1977, Jon Savage would be attacked by bassist Jean-Jacques Burnel of the Stranglers following the release of his negative review of the band's studio album No More Heroes. In which Savage wrote, "Oh, you guessed: I don't like the album. I've tried very hard [really: for all the 'right' reasons] but I still think it sucks." He later remarked:

I didn't have much of a sense of my gay identity at the time, nor did Jane, but it dictated our response to the increased laddism of punk, which we abhorred. There were endless arguments in Sounds editorial meetings about their objectification of Debbie Harry. I hated and still do the bully-boy aspect of punk, which began to emerge later in 1977. The Clash fell victim to it in a big way.

In England's Dreaming, Savage writes the UK punk scene was divided into "arties" and "social realists", stating "The arties had a continued interest in experimentation; the social realists talked about building a 'brick wall' and extolled the virtues of Punk's latest sensation, the ur-Punk Sham 69". Reynolds' 2005 book Rip It Up and Start Again echoed this sentiment, stating:

[...] the fragile unity that punk had forged between working class kids and arty, middle-class bohemians began to fracture. On the one side were the populist 'real punks' (later to evolve into the Oi! and hardcore movements) who believed that the music needed to stay accessible and unpretentious... the angry voice of the street. On the other side was the vanguard that came to be known as postpunk, who saw [the early days of punk in] 1977 not as a return to raw rock 'n' roll but as the chance to make a break with tradition.

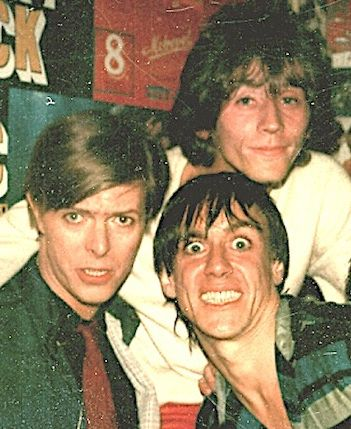
David Bowie and Iggy Pop, while in Berlin, recorded art rock albums, inspired by German krautrock

Writer David Buckley states that synthesizers and electronics were initially seen as "punk rock nightmares", with Joe Strummer of the Clash stating on television that the band had no synthesizers. However, this idea later changed, with Buckley arguing that it was Bowie's Berlin Trilogy, particularly the albums Low and "Heroes", that altered the punk scene's negative perception of electronic music. He added, "Sounds was the first British music weekly to realize that punk was exhausted and a dead end". Reynolds argued Bowie's Berlin Trilogy along with Iggy Pop's The Idiot, "signaled a shift away from America and rock 'n' roll toward Europe and a cool, controlled sound modelled on the Teutonic "motorik" rhythms of Kraftwerk and Neu!—a sound in which synthesizers played as much of a role as guitars". He would also describe Brian Eno's solo albums as "proto-New Wave", and that he became "one of the defining producers" of the post-punk era. Reynolds cited punk rock in the UK as splintering into several different subgenres between 1977 and 1978, with writer Matthew Worley stating that the scene had fractured into various "often competing versions of punk’s creation myth and alternate visions of 'where to now.'" Followed by, "The music press looked to determine new categorizations, some now all but forgotten: 'new musick,' 'power pop,' 'mod renewal,' 'futurist,' and 'new punk.'"

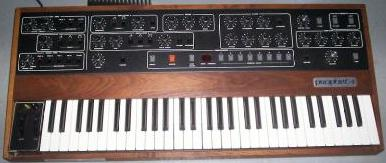
The Prophet-5, one of the first polyphonic synthesizers. It was widely used in 1980s synth-pop, along with the Roland Jupiter and Yamaha DX7.

At the time, there was a feeling of renewed excitement regarding what "new musick" or "post-punk" would entail, with Sounds publishing numerous preemptive editorials on the topic. Bands such as Wire would be labelled "New musick", with writer Clinton Heylin retrospectively stating, "They were, for now, England's arch-exponents of New Musick". In March 1978, ZigZag's Kris Needs would interview the band, stating:

WHEN WIRE came out of the Punk No-man's-land with their strikingly different debut album Pink Flag they seemed one of the hottest hopes for lifting rock out of the latrine it was rapidly digging itself into. Rave reviews and predictions for a bright future (with prospects) were very apparent in the Rock Press.

Guitarist Graham Lewis would state, "We've been called a Punk band, a New Wave band, and now we're a New Musick band". On 20 May 1978, writer Chris Westwood satirized the growing rise of "new musick" and "cold wave" while reviewing a Wire live concert in Record Mirror: "All adjectives have grown stale: cold, weird, psychotic, so have the labels – New Musick, New Schmusic. Cold Wave, blah blah blah, etc. In fact, writing about Wire is almost a cliché in itself these days, so let's just say that Wire are Wire and leave it at that, eh?". He later parodies Savage's 1977 "New Musick" editorial in the review. Additionally, American groups such as the Residents, Devo and MX-80 Sound would also be embraced as "new musick".

Several other British publications such as Smash Hits, Record Mirror, Melody Maker and NME began to use the term "new musick". Some journalists opted for the term "art punk" to describe artists "too sophisticated" and out of step with punk's dogma, though it was sometimes used by critics as a pejorative. Additionally, there were concerns over the authenticity of such bands in relation to a perceived punk ideology.

==== Criticism and decline ====
Between 1978-79, the British punk scene, particularly in London, was divided by ideological conflicts over whether the progressive and artistic influences being explored in new musick would undermine the authenticity of the punk movement. On 11 February 1978, British music journalist Chas de Whalley published an article in Sounds criticizing the term "new musick". Mimi Haddon notes his article argued that new musick mirrored the elitism of late-1960s and early-1970s progressive rock, where avoiding commercial songwriting led to rock music that was inaccessible for amateur musicians. De Whalley regarded the "art rock" era as "ten years of snobbery", and offered the term "power pop" as an opposition:

Power Pop is all down to the hooks and the excitement. In that respect even the New Musickites can join the party, providing they promise to leave their library books by the door and laugh and joke with the rest of us lesser mortals at least a time or two. And, you see, it is most ESSENTIAL that they do. No I'm not asking your MX 80 Sounds, your Devos, Pere Ubus, Siouxsie and the Banshees, the Pop Group or whoever/whatever to iron out their idiosyncracies, prostitute their art or compromise their ideals particularly. I'm just saying that if they refuse to move near kids, country and the world of hit singles, then they'll only be fostering the same kind-of musical elitism that deprived the people of their own medium of expression back in 1967. And, whether you approve of Power Pop terminology or not, you must agree that ten years of snobbery was ten years too many.

Savage retrospectively stated "Chas was not very happy with me, because I was striving ahead with new musick at the time while he was trying to promote power pop, which I thought was shit, and I also hated The Jam."

Haddon stated that the "New Musick category did not go without rebuff", citing ZigZag's Kris Needs stating a few months later that "It was around the time would-be trendsetters were trying to poleaxe Punk/New Wave with a New Musick elbow – a craze which kept its momentum for about a week before the much more accessible Power Pop wimped in". Similarly, Sounds writer Garry Bushell argued "New Punk" artists (later known as "Oi!") such as the Angelic Upstarts had more relevance than any of the "New Musick". Bushell would be an early supporter of Oi! as a reaction to the artistic intellectualization of punk, with "new punk" followers expressing appreciation for his support of "real kids" bands and his refusal to be an "intellectual snob". Labels such as "real punk" would be used interchangeably with "new punk" and later "Oi!".

Writers Sean Albiez and David Pattie retrospectively stated that new musick brought into question "enduring critical debates over authenticity and originality" in rock music. They cited the 1960s British Invasion as previously having explored similar debates in the media in regards to "originality in presenting a creative response to the blues that did not seek to be 'authentic'".

By the 1980s, "new musick" fell out of prominence and was replaced by the broad umbrella of "new wave" and "post-punk" interchangeably. Subsequently, "post-punk" became differentiated from "new wave" after their styles perceptibly narrowed.

== Legacy ==
A Sheffield fanzine named "New Musickal Excess" (NMX), produced by Martin Russian and established in March 1979, was named as a parody of "new musick" and the New Musical Express (NME).

== Related genres ==
=== Futurist ===
Futurist (also known as futurist pop) is a style of music originally coined by Sounds magazine in the early 1980s to denote artists in the Leeds and Manchester new wave scenes who made use of synthesizers. Artists such as Orchestral Manoeuvres in the Dark, Soft Cell and Simple Minds would be labelled "futurist". In 1981, Sounds published several top futurist singles charts.

== See also ==
- The Thin White Duke – David Bowie persona from 1975 to 1976
- Neo-psychedelia – Music genre based on 1960s psychedelic music
- Rip It Up and Start Again – 2005 book about post-punk by Simon Reynolds
- New pop – Music genre
- Authenticity in art – Concept concerning the genuineness and originality of artworks
- Rock Against Racism – Music festival and campaign (1976–1982)
- No wave – Music scene
- Art pop – Style of pop music
- Synthedelia – 1960s psychedelic rock and electronic music fusion genre
- Frippertronics – Recording techniques used by Robert Fripp
- Synth-pop – Music genre in which the synthesizer is the main instrument
- Electropop – Form of electronic songs/music
- Proto-punk – Music that foreshadowed the punk rock genre
- Garage rock – Genre of rock music
- Nazi chic – Fashion trend
- Hardcore punk – Aggressive and fast subgenre of punk rock
- Positive Punk – 1980s music subculture linked to the early gothic rock scene
- Rockism and poptimism – Ideological arguments in music journalism
- Sex Pistols at the Lesser Free Trade Hall – Sex Pistols' Manchester performances in 1976

== Bibliography ==
- Haddon, Mimi (2020). What Is Post-Punk?: Genre and Identity in Avant-Garde Popular Music, 1977–82. University of Michigan Press. ISBN 978-0-472-03921-0.
- Reynolds, Simon (2005). Rip It Up and Start Again: Postpunk 1978–1984. London: Faber and Faber. ISBN 978-0-14-303672-2.
- Gittins, Ian (2004). Talking Heads: Once in a Lifetime: the Stories Behind Every Song. Hal Leonard. ISBN 978-0-634-08033-3.
- Wilkinson, David (2016). Post-Punk, Politics and Pleasure in Britain. Springer. ISBN 978-1-137-49780-2.
- Cateforis, Theodore (2011-06-15). Are We Not New Wave?: Modern Pop at the Turn of the 1980s (Illustrated ed.). Ann Arbor: University of Michigan Press. ISBN 978-0-472-03470-3.
- Buckley, David (16 August 2012). Kraftwerk: Publikation (1st ed.). Omnibus Press. ISBN 978-1847729316.
- Worley, Matthew (2024). Zerox Machine: Punk, Post-Punk and Fanzines in Britain, 1976–88. Reaktion Books. ISBN 978-1789148596.
- Worley, Matthew (2017). No Future: Punk, Politics and British Youth Culture, 1976–1984. Cambridge University Press. ISBN 978-1316625606.
- Gorman, Paul (2022). Totally Wired: The Rise and Fall of the Music Press. Thames and Hudson Ltd. ISBN 978-0500022634.
- Lester, Paul (2009). Lowdown: The Story of Wire. Omnibus Press. ISBN 978-1847727107.
- Bennett, Andy; Stratton, Jon (2025). Pub Rock in the UK and Australia: From the 1970s to the Twenty-First Century. Routledge. ISBN 978-1032194622.
- Stubbs, David (2014). Future Days: Krautrock and the Building of Modern Germany (Main ed.). Faber & Faber. ISBN 978-0571346639.
- Joch, Markus; Jürgensen, Christoph; Kaiser, Gerhard (2024). Protestpop und Krautrock (in German). J.B. Metzler. ISBN 978-3662689776.
- Stubbs, David (2018). Mars by 1980: The Story of Electronic Music. Faber & Faber. ISBN 978-0571323975.
- Lonkin, Claudia (2024). Neue Deutsche Welle (Kindle ed.). Bloomsbury Academic. ISBN 979-8765103340.
- Heylin, Clinton (2007). Babylon's Burning: From Punk to Grunge. Canongate Books Ltd. ISBN 978-1841958798.
- Trowell, Ian (2023). Throbbing Gristle: An Endless Discontent. Intellect Books. ISBN 978-1789388268.
- Albiez, Sean; Pattie, David (2016). Brian Eno: Oblique Music. Bloomsbury Academic. ISBN 978-1441129123.
- Völker, Florian (2023). Kälte‑Pop: Die Geschichte des erfolgreichsten deutschen Popmusik-Exports (in German). De Gruyter Oldenbourg. ISBN 978-3111245157.
- Wodtke, Larissa (2023). Dance-Punk: 33 1/3 Genre Series. Bloomsbury Academic. ISBN 978-1501381867.
- Gorman, Paul (2001). In Their Own Write: Adventures in the Music Press. Sanctuary Publishing Ltd. ISBN 978-1860743412.
- Buckley, David (2005). Strange Fascination: David Bowie: The Definitive Story. Virgin Books. ISBN 978-0753510025.
- Savage, Jon (1996). Time Travel: Pop, Media and Sexuality, 1976-96. Chatto & Windus. ISBN 978-0701163600.
- Borthwick, Stuart; Moy, Ron (2004). Popular Music Genres: An Introduction. Edinburgh University Press. ISBN 978-0748617456.
- Savage, Jon (1991). England's Dreaming. Faber & Faber. ISBN 978-0571227204.
- Buckley, Jonathan (2003). The Rough Guide to Rock (3rd ed.). Rough Guides. ISBN 978-1843531050.
