= Astrophysics (band) =

Astrophysics is a band from Rio de Janeiro Brazil mainly consisting of André Luiz and his wife Min Tsgono (aka MINTTT).

Their music often combines elements of Coldwave, Gothic Rock, Synthpop, Atmospheric Drum and Bass and Breakbeat, among others.

== Discography ==
- Sunny Land (2016)
- Tomorrow Will Be Worse (2018)
- Revolutionary Girl (2018)
- Sweetness (Or How Other People's Music Are More Interesting) (2019)
- Bitterness (2019)
- Time Is Laughing At Me (2019)
- Astro's Bizarre Discoteque (2020)
- Synthetic Magic (2020)
- Bittersweet Reality (2020)
- Apathy (2020)
- Vacuum Noises (Or Synthgaze to Make You Cry and Wither) (2020)
- Selected & (A)pathetic (2021)
- Cute Tragedies (2021)
- Someday I'll See You Again (2021)
- The First Sound of the Future Past (2022)
- Selected & Tragic (2022)
- Hope Left Me (2022)
- The Second Summoning (2023)
- The Unending Need for Perpetual Motion (2024)
- Homeostasis (2024)
- Vanilla Deathwish (2025)
