= New pop =

Music genre

- Stylistic origins: Pop; post-punk; glam rock; synth-pop; progressive pop; dance-punk
- Cultural origins: Early 1980s, United Kingdom

Other topics
- MTV; New Romanticism; New wave; Rockism; Second British Invasion; Synth-pop; New musick

New pop is a British-centric pop music movement consisting of ambitious, DIY-minded artists who achieved commercial success in the early 1980s, aided by platforms like MTV. Rooted in the post-punk movement of the late 1970s, the movement encompassed a wide variety of styles and artists, including acts such as Orange Juice, the Human League, and ABC.

The term "rockist", a pejorative aimed at those who rejected this type of music, became associated with new pop.

"New Music" is a similar but slightly more expansive umbrella term referring to pop music and a cultural phenomenon in the US tied to the Second British Invasion. The term was popularized by the music industry and American journalists during the 1980s to describe emerging movements such as new pop and New Romanticism.

== Characteristics ==
Many new pop artists created music that blended less commercial and experimental elements with a pop appeal. The concept of entryism became popular among groups of the time, reflecting their attempts to infiltrate mainstream culture with unconventional styles.

New Music acts were characterized by danceable rhythms, an androgynous aesthetic, heavy use of synthesizers and drum machines, and lyrical themes exploring the darker side of romance. These acts were predominantly British and drew inspiration from rockabilly, Motown, ska, and reggae, incorporating African rhythms to create what was described as a "fertile, stylistic cross-pollination."

Author Simon Reynolds observed that the new pop movement represented "a conscious and brave attempt to bridge the separation between 'progressive' pop and mass/chart pop – a divide which has existed since 1967, and is also, broadly, one between boys and girls, middle-class and working-class."

The terms "New Music" or "new pop" were used loosely to describe various styles and artists, including synth-pop groups such as the Human League, soul-disco acts such as ABC, new wave performers like Elvis Costello and the Pretenders, and jangle pop bands like Orange Juice. American MTV stars, including Michael Jackson, were also associated with the movement.

Stephen Holden of The New York Times wrote that New Music was more about the artists themselves than their specific sound. It attracted teenage girls and males disillusioned with traditional, "phallic" guitar-driven rock. New Music was a singles-oriented phenomenon, emphasizing both 7-inch and the then-new 12-inch formats, in contrast to the 1970s emphasis on album-oriented rock.

== History ==
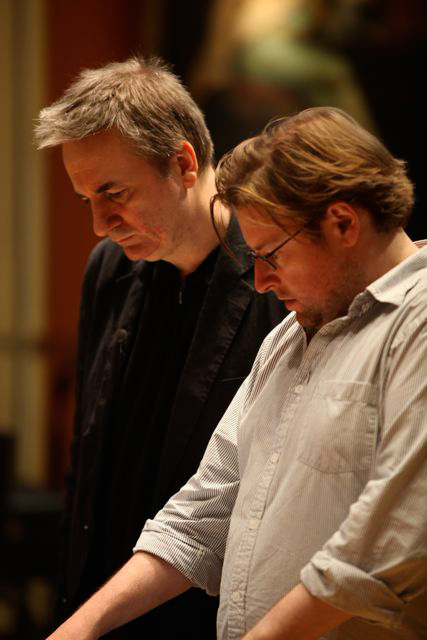
Producer and New Musical Express writer Paul Morley (left), a pivotal figure in new pop

In the wake of the punk rock explosion of the late 1970s, the new wave and post-punk genres emerged, driven by a desire for experimentation, creativity, and forward momentum. Music journalist Paul Morley, whose writing in the British music magazine NME championed the post-punk movement, has been credited as an influential voice in the development of new pop. Following the decline of post-punk, Morley advocated for "overground brightness" rather than underground sensibilities. Around this time, the term "rockist" gained popularity as a disparaging label for music that favored traditionalist rock styles. According to Pitchfork's Jess Harvel, "If new pop had an architect, it was [the writer] Paul Morley."

As the 1980s began, many musicians sought to broaden these movements to appeal to a more mainstream audience. In 1980, the New Music Seminar debuted as a platform designed to help young new wave artists break into the American music industry. The event grew rapidly in popularity and encouraged the shift from using the term "new wave" to "New Music" in the United States. Unlike in Great Britain, early attempts to introduce new wave and music videos to American audiences had achieved mixed results. By 1982, New Music acts were appearing on the U.S. charts, and clubs that played their songs were consistently packed.

"I hated the phrase 'new wave'. It sounded too trendy and could be gone in a year."

— Dennis McNamara, program director who oversaw Long Island, New York radio station WLIR's 1982 shift to a New Music format.

In response to New Music's rising popularity, album-oriented rock (AOR) radio stations increased their rotation of new acts, and the "Hot Hits" format emerged. By 1983, with half of the new artists emerging from the New Music movement, acts such as Duran Duran, Culture Club, and Men at Work were dominating the charts, creating an alternative musical and cultural mainstream. Annie Lennox and Boy George were among the figures most closely associated with New Music.

In a 1983 interview with CBS News about the Second British Invasion of new pop acts in America, singer Martin Fry of ABC described the phenomenon as "an explosion that came out after punk rock swung through Britain – a whole generation that was kind of interested in making music that was more polished. That obviously led to a golden age with Duran Duran, Spandau Ballet, the Human League, ABC, Depeche Mode, many bands like that. We were all a little bit flamboyant."

== Criticism and decline ==
Criticism of new pop emerged from supporters of both traditional rock and newer experimental rock. Critics viewed new pop as overly corporate, prioritizing commercial success at the expense of rock music's anti-authoritarian tradition. They argued that new pop's embrace of synthesizers and music videos often masked a lack of musical talent. For example, the heavy metal magazine Hit Parader frequently used the homophobic slur "faggot" to disparage New Music musicians. Similarly, the 1985 Dire Straits song "Money for Nothing", which reached number one in the United States, included the line "the little faggot with the earring and the make-up" and used the term multiple times. According to lead singer Mark Knopfler, the lyrics were inspired by the language of a New York appliance store worker he overheard while watching MTV. Assistant professor, author, and musician Theo Cateforis cites these examples as manifestations of homophobia used to defend "real rock" against New Music.

In the mid-1980s, a reaction against European synthpop and "haircut bands" began to emerge in the United States, marked by the rise of heartland rock and roots rock. Richard Blade, a disc jockey at Los Angeles radio station KROQ-FM, reflected on this period, stating, "You felt there was a winding-down of music. Thomas Dolby's album had bombed, Duran Duran had gone through a series of breakups, the Smiths had broken up, Spandau Ballet had gone away, and people were just shaking their heads going, 'What happened to all this new music?'"

Theo Cateforis argues that New Music eventually evolved into modern rock, which retained its uptempo feel while diverging stylistically. This evolution continued to draw influence from the rock disco/club scene.

In the UK, indie bands adopted the jangling guitar work that had typified new wave music. The arrival of the Smiths was characterized by the music press as a "reaction against the opulence and corpulence of nouveau riche New Pop" and a "return to a different vision of 'new pop,' the Postcard ideal."

== Bibliography ==
- Cateforis, Theo (2011). Are We Not New Wave?: Modern Pop at the Turn of the 1980s. University of Michigan Press. ISBN 978-0-472-03470-3.
- Reynolds, Simon (2005). Rip it Up and Start Again: Postpunk 1978-1984. Penguin Books. ISBN 978-0-14-303672-2.
- Reynolds, Simon (2006), "New Pop and its Aftermath", On Record: Rock, Pop and the Written Word, Routledge, ISBN 978-1-134-93951-0
