= Cold wave (disambiguation) =

Cold wave may refer to:

- Cold wave, a weather phenomenon in Winter that brings colder weather
- Cold wave (music), a style of post-punk originating in France
- Coldwave (USA), a style of industrial metal originating in the United States
