= Trisomie 21 =

French band

- Origin: Denain, France
- Genres: Cold wave, minimal wave, darkwave, synthpop, Post Punk
- Years active: 1980–present
- Labels: Play It Again Sam, Le Maquis, Alfa Matrix, Scarface, Stechak, Himalaya

Trisomie 21 is a French cold wave group, formed in Denain, in the north of France, near Valenciennes in 1980 by brothers Philippe and Hervé Lomprez.

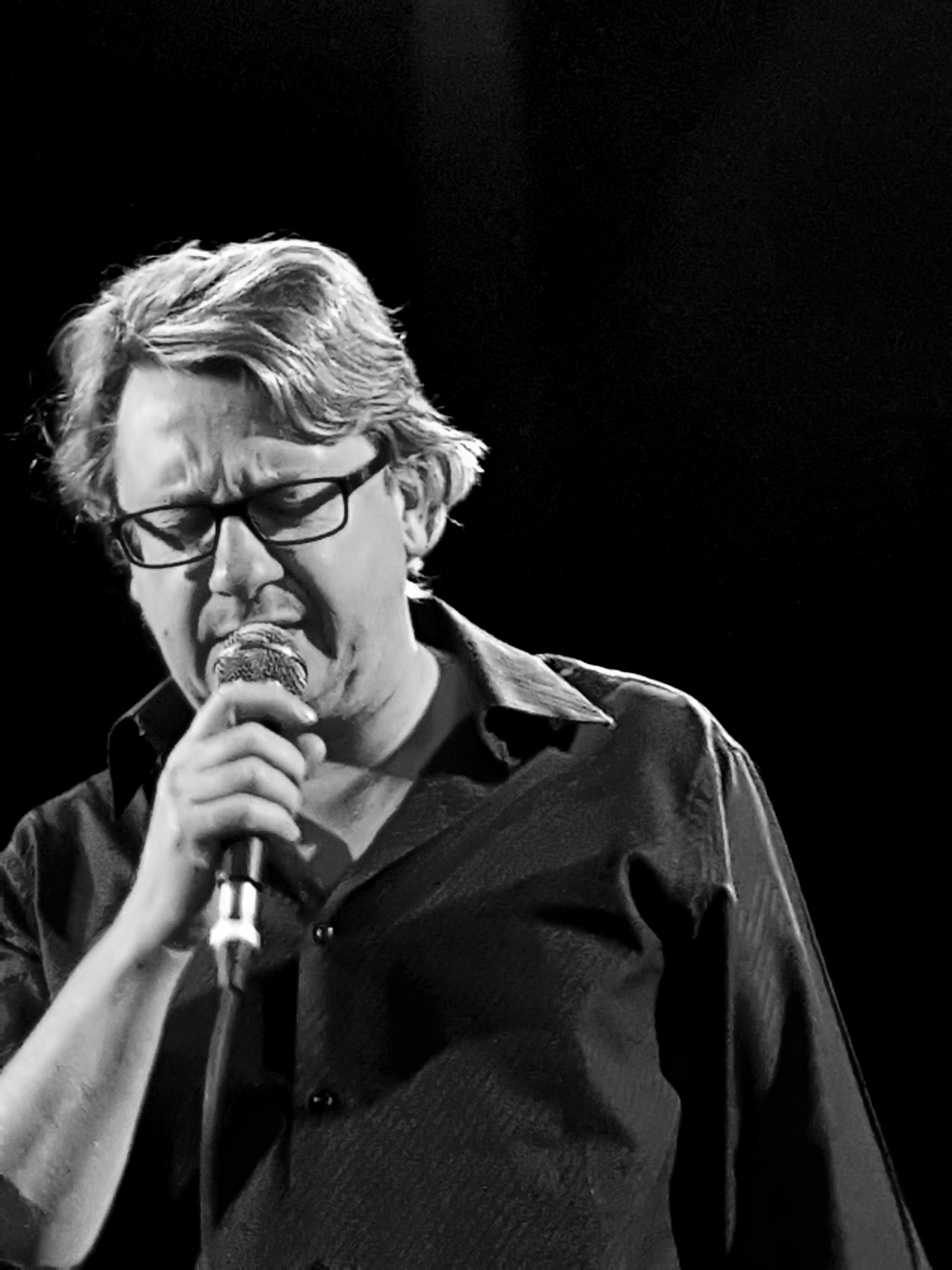
Philippe Lomprez, 2017

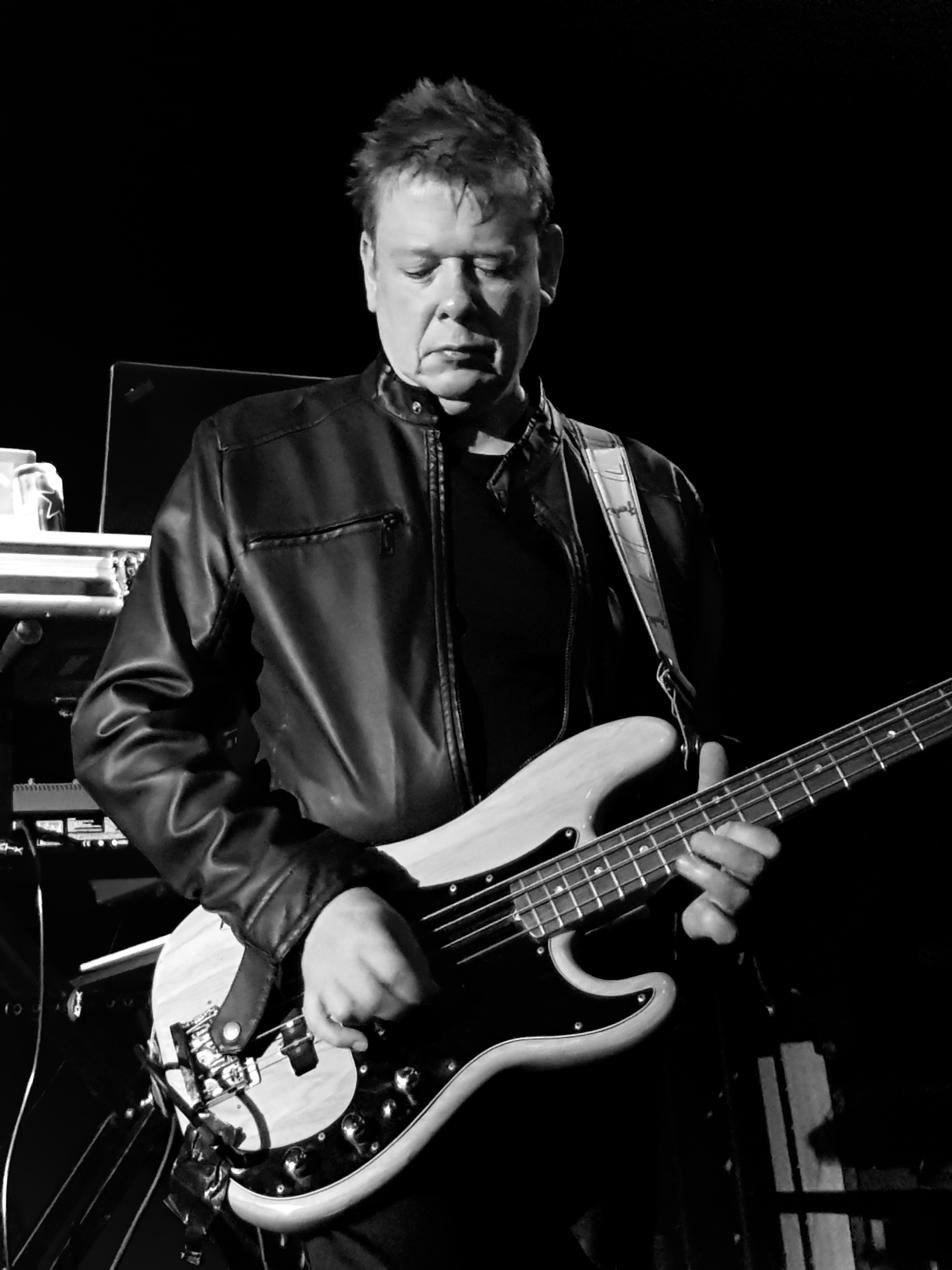
Hervé Lomprez, 2017

== History ==
Throughout the 1980s and '90s, Trisomie 21 was signed to Play It Again Sam.

In September 2007, Trisomie 21 were signed to Belgian label Alfa Matrix where they joined acts such as Front 242, Leaether Strip, Anne Clark and Mentallo and the Fixer.

== Discography ==
Studio albums

- Passions Divisées (1984)
- Chapter IV – Le Je-Ne-Sais-Quoi Et Le Presque Rien (1986)
- Million Lights – A Collection of Songs by Trisomie 21 (1987)
- T21 Plays the Pictures (1989)
- Works (1989)
- Raw Material. (1990)
- Distant Voices (1992)
- Gohohako (1997)
- Happy Mystery Child (2004)
- Black Label (2009)
- ELEGANCE NEVER DIES (2017)

EPs

- Le Repos Des Enfants Heureux (1983)
- Wait & Dance (1985)
- Final Work (1989)

Remix albums/EPs

- Chapter IV Remix – Le Je-Ne-Sais-Quoi Et Le Presque Rien (1987)
- The Man Is a Mix (2004)
- The Woman Is a Mix (2006)
- Happy Mystery Club – Lady B Remixes (2006)
- 3700426905961 (EP; 2008)
- The Camp – Black Label Remix (2009)
- Happy E.N.D. (2018)

Live albums

- The Official Bootlet (Million Lights Tour) (1988)
- Rendez-vous En France (2007)

Compilation albums

- The First Songs (1988)
- Side by Side (1991)
- The Songs by T21 Vol. 1 (1994)
- The Songs by T21 Vol. 2 (1995)
- 25 Years (2007)

Singles

- "Joh Burg" (1986)
- "Shift Away ° Jakarta ° Ravishing Delight" (1987)
- "Works in Progress" (1989)
- "La Fete Triste" (1995)
- "Red or Green (Remixes)" (2005)
- "Midnight of My Life (Remixes)" (2005)
- "Red or Green / She Died for Love" (2005)
