= Rockism and poptimism =

Ideological arguments in music journalism

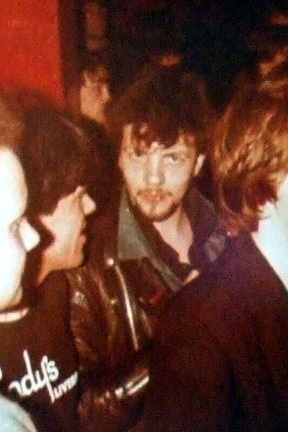
Rock musician Pete Wylie is credited with coining "rockism" in 1981.

Rockism and poptimism are ideological arguments about popular music prevalent in mainstream music journalism. Rockism is the belief that rock music depends on values such as authenticity and artfulness, which elevate it over other forms of popular music.

The term "rockism" was coined in 1981 by English rock musician Pete Wylie. It soon became a pejorative used humorously by self-described "anti-rockist" music journalists. The term was not generally used beyond the music press until the mid-2000s, and its emergence then was partly attributable to bloggers using it more seriously in analytical debate. In the 2000s, a critical reassessment of pop music was underway, and by the next decade, poptimism supplanted rockism as the prevailing ideology in popular music criticism.

While poptimism was envisioned and encouraged as a corrective to rockist attitudes, opponents of its discourse argue that it has resulted in certain pop stars being shielded from negative reviews as part of an effort to maintain a consensus of uncritical excitement. Others argue that the two ideologies have similar flaws.

== History ==
=== Early rock criticism ===
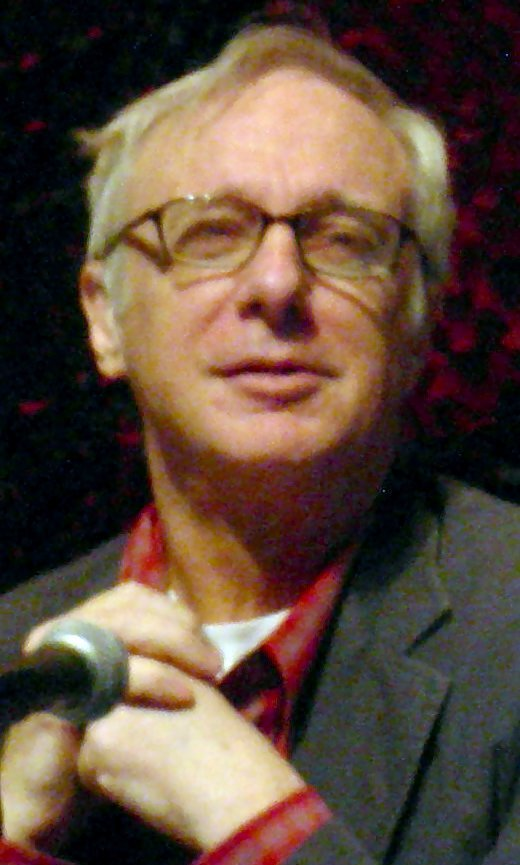
Robert Christgau, pictured in 2005, became one of the first professional rock and pop critics. He later criticised Rolling Stone for promoting the "boring rock-as-idealism myth".

Until the late 1960s, "pop" was synonymous with "rock" or "rock and roll". From the 1960s to the 1970s, music magazines such as Rolling Stone and Creem laid the foundation for popular music criticism in an attempt to make popular music worthy of study. Following the release of the Beatles' 1967 album Sgt. Pepper's Lonely Hearts Club Band, such magazines began drawing a contrast between "pop" and "rock" (with "rock and roll" now referring to the 1950s style), creating a division that gave generic significance to both terms.

"Pop" became associated with music that was more commercial, ephemeral, and accessible. "Rock" became associated with a style that was usually heavier and centered on the electric guitar. Besides general differences in style, the two words became associated with differing values. Many early rock reporters believed that rock embodied a particular set of values, such as rebelliousness, innovation, seriousness and sociopolitical intent.

Not all critics supported the integration of high culture values into rock music, or the importance of personal expression. Some believed that such values were merely impositions of the cultural establishment. Nonetheless, a widespread belief among music critics in the 1960s and 1970s was that truly artistic music was made by singer-songwriters using traditional rock instruments on long-playing albums, and that pop was on a lower aesthetic plane, a "guilty pleasure".

In an essay published in Ulrich Beck's Global America?: The Cultural Consequences of Globalization (2004), the sociologist Motti Regev says the canonizing of rock music among professional critics had created a status structure and orthodoxy that carried over into other developments in popular music through the next century. As examples of this "continuous canonization", Regev cites Robert Christgau's decade-end "Consumer Guide" collections (for the 1970s, 1980s, and 1990s) and Colin Larkin's All Time Top 1000 Albums book. (Note: Regev elaborates on this in "'Rockization': Diversity within Similarity in World Popular Music" (2004): "The artistic and cultural status of rock pushed other actors in contemporary popular music to adopt the stylistic and sonic innovations explored by rock musicians and turn them into the conventional way of making music. In other words, the canonization of rock triggered the emergence of (in Bourdieu's terminology) an artistic field of popular music structured around a hierarchy of prestige. In this field, the dominant positions are occupied by the already canonized 'avant-garde' of earlier periods and by the upcoming styles and musicians hailed as the new 'avant-garde' by power-holding critics and reviewers in the field.")

=== New pop ===
Following the rise of punk rock in the late 1970s, the new wave and post-punk genres emerged informed by a desire for experimentation, creativity and forward movement. Paul Morley, whose writing in the British music magazine NME championed the post-punk movement in the late 1970s, is credited as an influential voice in the development of new pop following the dissipation of post-punk, advocating "overground brightness" over underground sensibilities. Around this time, the term "rockist" gained popularity to disparagingly describe music that privileged traditionalist rock styles. According to Pitchfork's Jess Harvel: "If new pop had an architect, it was Paul Morley."

== Definitions and etymology ==
=== Rockism ===
"Rockism" was coined in 1981 when the English rock musician Pete Wylie announced his Race Against Rockism campaign, an inversion of Rock Against Racism. The term was immediately repurposed as a polemical label to identify and critique a cluster of beliefs and assumptions in music criticism. Morley recalled:

... one or two music journalists writing in the one or two music magazines that existed then were very pleased. I was one of them, and was using the term "rockist" the minute after I read Wylie say it. ... If the idea of rockism confused you, and you lazily thought Pink Floyd were automatically better than Gang of Four, and that good music had stopped with punk, you were a rockist and you were wrong. ... Anti-rockism was always violently pro-pop, largely because we original campaigning anti-rockists had been given such a tough time at school for liking [David] Bowie and [Marc] Bolan and not ELP and Led Zep.

There is no consensus for the definition of "rockism". During the 1990s, rockism was defined as demanding a perception of authenticity in pop music despite whatever artifice is needed. In 2004, the critic Kelefa Sanneh offered a definition of rockists: "Someone who reduces rock 'n' roll to a caricature, then uses that caricature as a weapon. Rockism means idolizing the authentic old legend (or underground hero) while mocking the latest pop star; lionizing punk while barely tolerating disco; loving the live show and hating the music video; extolling the growling performer while hating the lip-syncher." He accused rockists of sexism, racism and homophobia.

Seattle Weekly's Douglas Wolk acknowledged the loose definition of rockism and proposed: "Rockism, let's say, is treating rock as normative. In the rockist view, rock is the standard state of popular music: the kind to which everything else is compared, explicitly or implicitly." PopMatters' Robert Loss wrote that "traditionalism" describes the policing of the present with the past, making it a better word for "rockism". The design critic and indie pop musician Nick Currie compared rockism to the international art movement Stuckism, which holds that artists who do not paint or sculpt are not true artists.

=== Poptimism ===
There is a name for this new critical paradigm, "popism"—or, more evocatively (and goofily), "poptimism"—and it sets the old assumptions on their ear: pop (and, especially, hip-hop) producers are as important as rock auteurs, Beyoncé is as worthy of serious consideration as Bruce Springsteen, and ascribing shame to pop pleasure is itself a shameful act.

— Jody Rosen, May 2006

Poptimism (also called popism), a portmanteau of pop and optimism, holds that pop music deserves the same respect as rock music and is as authentic and as worthy of professional critique and interest. It positions itself as an antidote to rockism and developed following Carl Wilson's book about Celine Dion's album Let's Talk About Love and Sanneh's 2004 article against rockism in The New York Times. In the essay, Sanneh asks music listeners to "stop pretending that serious rock songs will last forever, as if anything could, and that shiny pop songs are inherently disposable, as if that were necessarily a bad thing. Van Morrison's Into the Music was released the same year as the Sugarhill Gang's 'Rapper's Delight'; which do you hear more often?" Loss cited Sanneh's article as "a sort of ur-text on poptimism", writing:

By its impoverished terms, the rockist represents traditional values of authenticity while the poptimist is progressive, inclusive, and sees through the myths of authenticity. The rockist is nostalgic—the old fart who says they don't make any good music anymore—while the poptimist looks forward and values the new. The rockist makes Art out of popular music, insists on serious meaning, and demands artists who sing their own songs and play instruments, preferably guitars; the poptimist lets pop be fun and, if not meaningless, slight. The rockist is a purist, the poptimist a pluralist; the rockist is old, the popist is young; the rockist is anti-commercialist, the poptimist could care less. [sic]

After Sanneh's article was published, an argument about rockism developed in web circles. In 2006, the music journalist Jody Rosen noted the growing backlash against rock's traditional acclaim and the new poptimism ideology. The online music publication Pitchfork, which initially focused on indie and alternative music, expanded to cover mainstream acts such as Taylor Swift and began to publish fewer critical reviews. The Pitchfork founder, Ryan Schreiber, found Swift "extremely bland and uninteresting" and out of Pitchfork's scope, but his colleagues disagreed. He later said Pitchfork had been suffering an "identity crisis".

By 2015, Washington Post writer Chris Richards wrote that, after a decade of "righteously vanquishing [rockism's] nagging falsehood", poptimism had become "the prevailing ideology for today's most influential music critics. Few would drop this word in conversation at a house party or a nightclub, but in music-journo circles, the idea of poptimism itself is holy writ." In 2025, Sanneh wrote that poptimism "bled into a broader belief that it was bad manners to criticize any cultural product that people liked, whether it be a pop song or a superhero movie or a romance novel".

== Criticism of poptimism ==
=== Overlap with rockism ===
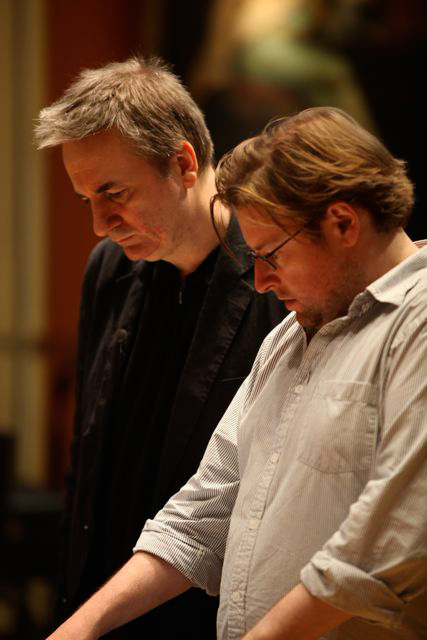
Paul Morley (left), a longtime critic of rockism, argued that many of poptimism's traits were indistinguishable from rockism.

In 2006, Morley derided the seriousness of contemporary music writers: "Many of the self-proclaimed American anti-rockists—or popists, or poptimists, or pop pricks—actually write with a kind of fussy, self-important rockist sheen. And for all their studious over-analysis, any definition of rockism is the same today as it's always been." That same year, Rosen spoke positively of the new movement but forewarned of possible excesses; that a hierarchy of music biased toward pop is no better than one biased toward rock because both genres have respectable qualities that cannot be ignored.

A week later, PopMatters' Rob Horning responded to Rosen's writing with a more negative view of poptimism, writing that it is "sad to think the sharpest critics drowning in self-importance while believing they are shedding themselves of it. Basically by rejecting all that was once deemed important by a previous generation and embracing the opposite, you can make the case for your own importance. This is not optimism, it's reaction."

Writing for The Quietus in 2017, Michael Hann, the music editor for The Guardian, argued that "the poptimists are just as proscriptive as the rockists". He listed the following as poptimist "sacred cows, which are beyond challenge":

- "The solo release by the member of a manufactured group is no longer the sad addendum to the imperial years; it is a profound statement of artistic integrity."
- "The surprise release by the big-name act is in itself, a revolutionary act."
- "To not care about Taylor Swift or Beyoncé or Lady Gaga or Zayn Malik is in itself questionable. It reveals not your taste in music, but your prejudices. In the worst-case scenario, you may be revealing your unconscious racism and sexism. At best, you're trolling."
- "Commercial success, in and of itself, should be taken as at least one of the markers of quality. After all, 50m Elvis fans can't be wrong."
- "Just as 'authenticity' is worthless as a symbol of a music's worth, so contrivance and cynicism might be elevated and celebrated, as evidence of the maker's awareness of the game they are playing."

According to Loss, rockism and poptimism are ultimately the same thing, and both rockists and poptimists treat music as a social commodity while mystifying the conditions in which music occurs. He adds that, as is common in "a culture wherein history isn't valued much", poptimism neglects its historical precedents. As it presents itself as a radical break in the discourse of popular culture, older rock critics and journalists are usually depicted as "a bunch of bricklayers for the foundations of the Rock and Roll Hall of Fame", a notion that Loss disputes: "Like film studies, rock criticism of the late '60s and the '70s was an attempt to make popular music worthy of study; it was poptimism before its day. It's somehow become generally accepted that rock criticism before the new millennium was overwhelmingly rockist."

=== Commercial bias ===
After the 2000s, the effects of poptimism attracted a belief that once a pop star reaches a certain level of stardom, many critics will safeguard them from negative reviews. Richards argued that poptimism cheerleads the already successful while privileging consensus and smothering dissent. New York Times Magazine's Saul Austerlitz called poptimism a product of click-driven internet journalism that aspired to the lowest common denominator while being hostile to fans of genres and bands associated with rockism. He criticised it for allowing pop music fans to avoid expanding their taste and contrasted the types of music lauded by poptimists with the literature and film praised by book and film critics. "Should gainfully employed adults whose job is to listen to music thoughtfully really agree so regularly with the taste of 13-year-olds?"

Loss agreed with Austerlitz's text: "When [he] wrote that 'music criticism's former priority—telling consumers what to purchase—has been rendered null and void for most fans. In its stead, I believe, many critics have become cheerleaders for pop stars,' I imagined an editor and a record label exec swooping down on him saying, 'Don't tell them that!' We like to believe criticism is devoid of crass commercialism, but Austerlitz gives away that it never was in the first place." He also noted a minuscule number of low-rated albums in publications such as Rolling Stone, Pitchfork and PopMatters, and that "telling consumers what to purchase is still the point of a lot of music 'criticism'".

Hann says that when writers deal with "upmarket" readership, they "need to be able to justify your coverage, and that [means] thinkpieces hailing the cultural significance of the new pop stars. ... And once you've decided these subjects matter, it's hard to turn round and say: 'Actually, you know what? This isn't much cop.'" He describes his experience as music editor for The Guardian, where he has "been commissioning those pieces, knowing they will be read ... if no one wanted to read about Taylor Swift, you would never see another thinkpiece about her. Instead, we enter an arms race of hyperbole, as we credit her with forcing Apple to change its streaming terms, dismantling the musical patriarchy, creating new paradigms in music and society."

== Bibliography ==
- Reynolds, Simon (2005). Rip It Up and Start Again: Postpunk 1978–1984. London: Faber and Faber. ISBN 978-0-14-303672-2.
- Savage, Jon (1991). England's Dreaming. Faber & Faber. ISBN 978-0571227204.
