= Black Music (magazine) =

British music magazine

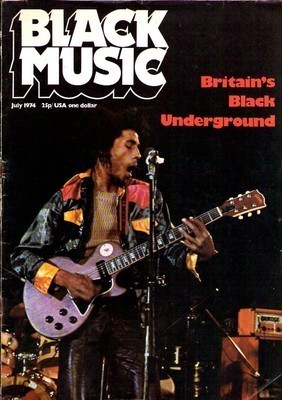
Issue cover dated July 1974, featuring Bob Marley

Black Music (Black Music & Jazz Review from April 1978) was a pioneering British music magazine, published monthly. The first issue, edited by Alan Lewis, came out in December 1973 and the last in April 1984. It was the first publication in the United Kingdom to write about reggae as a serious cultural phenomenon and also the first to cover African music.

Under the 1978–1984 editorship of Chris May, who succeeded, in chronological order, Alan Lewis, Tony Cummings and Geoff Brown, the magazine championed hip hop, rap, Two Tone, avant-garde jazz and electro music in the face of hostility from British black music's, at the time, socially reactionary and still mostly white-controlled power structure, and published writing by black creatives whose work had an explicitly political dimension (notably including Linton Kwesi Johnson, Archie Shepp, Fela Kuti, Miriam Makeba, Michael Thelwell, Gil Scott Heron, Thomas Mapfumo and Hugh Masekela). Under May's editorship, the magazine also maintained extensive coverage of African music, which May had introduced as a freelance contributor in the mid 1970s with his Afroheat column.

In April 1984, Chris May left the magazine to head up the UK office of Celluloid Records. Following his departure, the title Black Music & Jazz Review (though not the editorial perspective) was absorbed by sister magazine Blues & Soul and ceased to exist other than as a small-print add-on to the BS masthead.
