= Martin Dupont =

French band

- Origin: Marseille, France
- Genres: Electronic, new wave, cold wave
- Years active: 1980–1988, 2022–present
- Labels: Minimal Wave, Label Caravan
- Members: Alain Seghir; Beverley Jane Crew; Sandy Casado; Thierry Sintoni; Olivier Leroy
- Past members: Catherine Loy; Brigitte Balian

Martin Dupont is a French electro, new wave and cold wave band formed in Marseille in 1980. Best known for their synth-pop melodies, the original line-up consisted of Alain Seghir (vocals, bass, synthesizer, guitar), Brigitte Balian (vocals, synthesizer, guitar, bass) and Catherine Loy (vocals). Although Seghir remained the main songwriter, the line-up changed with additions, including the classically trained musician Beverley Jane Crew (clarinet, saxophone, synthesizer) in 1983, Sandy Casado (vocals and synthesizer) and Thierry Sintoni (guitar and synthesizer) of Rise and Fall of a Decade and Girls Like You, and Olivier Leroy (vocals and synthesizer).

The band released three critically acclaimed albums: "Just Because (Facteurs d’Ambiance)" (1984), "Sleep Is A Luxury" (1985) and "Hot Paradox" (1987). They broke up in 1988 but steadily developed a cult following over the following decades, and have been sampled by Kanye West, Tricky and Madlib. They reformed in 2022 and toured the following year. The song "Inside Out" from "Hot Paradox" (1987) was featured in the film Cuckoo (2024).

== History ==
Alain Seghir grew up in Marseille and had interest in music from a young age; his strict father, however, forbade him from taking music lessons and sent him to a Catholic boarding school. There, he joined the choir and was also able to further nurture his passion for music by playing bass and synthesizers. Alain began dating Catherine Loy, who, despite not having a musical background, was convinced to sing on Alain's compositions. Brigitte Balian, who had been playing in another band in a rehearsal room next door, was recruited into Martin Dupont as well. Beverley Jane Crew, who had moved to Marseille from London, also joined the group, playing clarinet and saxophone. According to Alain Seghir, their opening performance for The Lounge Lizards was their only performance as a four-piece band. Catherine Loy left the group after this brief period.

Alain has said that the artistic choice to sing in English rather than French stemmed from shyness but also because his father didn't speak English, so he could sing more openly without fear. While recording and playing as Martin Dupont, Alain was also studying to become an ENT surgeon. Once he had completed medical school, Alain became busy with his work, and "on a whim" sold all of his synthesizers; in the absence of an official break up, Martin Dupont became dormant.

In 2009, Alain Seghir was contacted by Veronica Vascika, the founder of the New York City-based music label Minimal Wave, who expressed interest in rereleasing Martin Dupont's discography. This, coupled with renewed interest in the band's music, led the band's classic lineup of Seghir, Balian, Crew, to reunite in 2022 and tour Europe, and for the first time, North America in 2023. For the 2023 tour, the band was accompanied by Thierry Sintoni and Sandy Casado of Rise and Fall of a Decade and Girls Like You, and Olivier Leroy. The album Kintsugi, a compilation of new recordings of some of the band's old songs, was released in 2023. During the band's renewed period of activity, the band's lineup underwent changes, including the band parting ways with Brigitte Balian. Sintoni, Casado, and Leroy subsequently became members of the band, joining Seghir and Crew. The band released their first studio album of new material since 1987, You Smile When It Hurts, on October 17, 2025, accompanied by a North American tour.

== Discography ==
=== Albums ===
- Just Because (1984)
- Sleep Is A Luxury (1985)
- Hot Paradox (1987)
- Kintsugi (2023) (Includes single "Your Passion")
- You Smile When It Hurts (2025)

=== Compilations ===
- Lost and Late (2008)
- The Complete Collection 1980-1988 (2022)
- New Paradox (2026)
