= Alan Lewis (music journalist) =

British music journalist and editor (1945–2021)

Alan Lewis (1945 – 23 June 2021) was a British music journalist and editor.

He began his career on local newspapers, before starting work as production editor at Melody Maker in 1969. From there, he helped found Black Music magazine in 1973, and in the late 1970s became the editor of Sounds magazine, where he encouraged such writers as Jon Savage, Sandy Robertson, Sylvie Simmons, Vivien Goldman and Geoff Barton. In 1979, he was responsible for coining the term "New Wave of British Heavy Metal" (NWOBHM), as a headline for an article by Barton.

In 1981, he founded Kerrang! magazine, initially as an offshoot of Sounds, with Barton as its editor. It later became a regular monthly, and then weekly, magazine. Lewis left journalism for some time to run a pub, but returned to edit pop music magazine No.1 in 1983, and then as editor of NME in 1987. There, he recruited journalist James Brown, who later became NME editor, as well as writers including Stuart Maconie and Steve Lamacq. Lewis became responsible for both NME and Melody Maker, and launched the magazines Vox and Muzik. He also assisted Brown in founding and establishing Loaded magazine in 1994. In 1997, Lewis oversaw the launch of Uncut, another music magazine, as editor-in-chief. He won the British Society of Magazine Editors' Lifetime Achievement Award in 1997. After leaving IPC, he became editor of Record Collector magazine from 2003 until retiring to his home in Buckinghamshire in 2011.

He died in 2021, aged 75, after suffering from Parkinson's disease and cancer.

Media offices
Preceded by Ian Pye	Editor of the NME; 1987–1990	Succeeded by Danny Kelly
