= Rip It Up and Start Again =

2005 book about post-punk by Simon Reynolds

Rip It Up and Start Again: Postpunk 1978–1984
- Author: Simon Reynolds
- Language: English
- Subject: Post-punk music
- Genre: Non-fiction
- Publisher: Faber & Faber
- Publication date: April 2005
- Publication place: England
- Media type: Print, e-book
- Pages: 607 (xxx, 577)
- ISBN: 0571252273

Rip It Up and Start Again: Postpunk 1978–1984 is a book by Simon Reynolds on the post-punk musical genre and era. It was first released in the UK in April 2005 by Faber & Faber. The US edition was published by Penguin Books and released in February 2006. It is a shorter version, with several chapters either removed or condensed, and without the large number of illustrations in the UK edition. Reynolds notes this was for space and cost reasons.

== Background ==
Simon Reynolds cites his article in the British magazine Uncut entitled "Post-Punk: Lubricate Your Living Room" published in December 2001 as being "the acorn out of which Rip It Up and Start Again grew".

== Reception ==
Writing for The Guardian, Nicholas Lezard described the book as "startlingly thoughtful, gracefully illuminating, in command of an anarchic subject," writing that "Reynolds has reilluminated the period for us, shown us how fascinating and rewarding it was." The Observer described the book as "a compelling reminder of a time when clever, mischievous, creative people formed bands". The New York Times called it "exhaustive and exhausting in equal measure."

== Criticism ==
Reynolds' Rip It Up and Start Again is widely referenced as post-punk doctrine, although he has stated that the book only covers aspects of post-punk that he had a personal inclination toward. Writer David Wilkinson noted contention over Reynolds’ interpretation of how post-punk cultural production was understood at the time, calling it "apparent revisionism and 'rebranding'". Author/musician Alex Ogg criticised the book stating that: "The problem is not with what Reynolds left out of Rip It Up ..., but, paradoxically, that too much was left in". Ogg suggested that post-punk pertains to a set of artistic sensibilities and approaches rather than any unifying style, and disputed the accuracy of the term's chronological prefix "post", as various groups commonly labelled "post-punk" predate the punk rock movement.

In 2006, it was also subject to criticism by writer Clinton Heylin in a book entitled Babylon's Burning: From Punk to Grunge: "Here [is] post-punk - at least before Simon Reynolds decided it was All The Music That I Liked When I Was Young, a somewhat broad not to say solipsistic, view of pop". Alex Ogg of The Quietus noted that Reynolds was frank in his musical choices: "Reynolds was honest enough in announcing his solipsism, in so far as Rip It Up addresses those elements of post-punk that appeal to him".

== Editions ==
- UK edition: Reynolds, Simon. Rip It Up and Start Again: Postpunk 1978–1984. London: Faber & Faber, 2005. ISBN 0571215696
- US edition: Reynolds, Simon. Rip It Up and Start Again: Postpunk 1978–1984. London: Penguin Books, 2006. ISBN 0143036726

== Bibliography ==
- Wilkinson, David (2016). Post-Punk, Politics and Pleasure in Britain. Springer. ISBN 978-1-137-49780-2.
- Heylin, Clinton (2007). Babylon's Burning: From Punk to Grunge. Canongate Books Ltd. ISBN 978-1841958798.
