= Cold wave (music) =

Music genre

- Other names: Coldwave
- Stylistic origins: Dark wave; punk rock; electronic music; new musick
- Cultural origins: Late 1970s – early 1980s, Europe
- Derivative forms: EBM; electronica

Other topics
- Gothic rock; minimal wave; post-punk; new wave

Cold wave (also known as coldwave) is a music genre that emerged during the late 1970s and early 1980s, particularly in France, Poland and Belgium. The genre was originally pioneered by post-punk and dark wave bands who drew influence from German electronic music group Kraftwerk and made use of affordable, portable synthesizers and electronic instruments.

== Etymology ==
The term "cold wave" was originally coined by Sounds magazine on their 26 November 1977 issue on "New Musick". The label is a loosely defined descriptor, derived from "new wave", that was originally reserved for a collection of punk and electronic styles from the 1970s. The scope of the genre has evolved continuously throughout its history.

According to The SAGE Handbook of Popular Music (2014), "cold wave" is an early synonym for music that was later termed "dark wave", "goth", and "deathrock". Treblezine's Jeff Terich remarked, "cold wave" was ultimately subsumed by retrospective labels such as "minimal wave" or "minimal synth".

Veronica Vasicka, who coined "minimal wave", did so with the intent of tying together terms such as "minimal electronics", "new wave", and "cold wave" which had frequently appeared in music magazines of the early 1980s.

== Characteristics ==
According to Tom Watson of Crack magazine, "the collective sound [of cold wave] was controlled yet 'colder' than that of their snotty predecessors – punk, with a depressive groove." Watson also identified "less guitar work, more analogue experimentation, militant rhythm sections and, above all else, a vehemently do-it-yourself attitude" as a part of cold wave's shared ideology.

The Guardian's Louis Pattison has stated that during the 1980s French cold wave bands such as Martin Dupont, Les Provisoires and Asylum Party "started playing gloomy post-punk in their native tongue, inspired by the icy guitars and studio-produced drum sounds pioneered by Factory Records producer Martin Hannett." The style is characterized by its detached lyrical tone, use of early electronic music instruments, as well as a minimalist approach and style. Artists made use of affordable, portable synthesizers such as the Korg MS-20.

== History ==
=== Origins: 1970s–1980s ===
The front cover of Sounds November 1977 issue on "New Musick" with the caption "The cold wave", with a picture of Ralf Hütter and Florian Schneider of Kraftwerk

The term "cold wave" appeared in the 26 November 1977 "New Musick" issue of UK weekly music paper Sounds. The caption of its cover picture, showing Kraftwerk's Ralf Hütter and Florian Schneider was "New musick: The cold wave". That year, Kraftwerk released Trans-Europe Express. The term was repeated the following week in Sounds by journalist Vivien Goldman, in an article about Siouxsie and the Banshees. in which she wrote: "the cold, cold wave breaking over your head, and for one second you don't know whether you're going to see daylight again". In 1977, Siouxsie and the Banshees described their music as "cold, machine-like and passionate at the same time", and Sounds magazine prophecised about the band: "[they] sound like a 21st century industrial plant [...] Listen to the cold wave roar from the '70s into the '80s".

A scene of French, Belgian and Polish musicians, dubbed "cold wave", emerged between the late 1970s and early 1980s. The French scene was also known as "la vague froide" (lit. 'the cold wave'), which was a term coined by the French music press to describe the sound of the band Marquis de Sade. According to Vice, the most notable acts were Marquis de Sade, Asylum Party, and Twilight Ritual. Brave Punk World author James Greene cited Marquis de Sade's 1979 album Dantzig Twist as "a classic" of the genre. He also referenced KaS Product as a group that "pushed cold wave to icier places in the early 1980s and ended up one of its preeminent voices." Other notable French groups include Opéra De Nuit and Trisomie 21.

Benelux cold wave artists and cassette labels communicated through an underground cassette culture; Alain Neffe's Insane Music label in Belgium was heavily active in European cassette culture. Schoolwerth also stated that Al Margolis of New York's Sound of Pig Tapes and Chris Phinney of Tennessee's Harsh Reality Music, who were active in the industrial/experimental music scene, were largely responsible from introducing minimal synth and cold wave artists to the United States.

=== 2000s–2010s: Revival ===
Wierd Records is credited with establishing interest in the style in the US, while The Liberty Snake Club did much to popularize it within the UK. The Tigersushi Records compilation So Young but So Cold, compiled by Ivan Smagghe, is one document of the scene. Crack journalist Tom Watson referenced Angular Recordings' Cold Waves and Minimal Electronics (2010) as a "crucial" compilation.

Wierd Records' weekly Wednesday night party in New York was described by The Guardian journalist Louis Pattinson as the locus of the cold wave and minimal synth revival of the early 2000s. Artists who performed at these parties included Blacklist and Xeno & Oaklander.

Bands like Linea Aspera, Lebanon Hanover, TR/ST, Austra and Cold Cave are considered as influential in the modern resurgence of the genre.

== Bibliography ==
- Mercer, Mick (1996). "France", "Belgium". Hex Files: The Goth Bible. Woodstock: The Overlook Press. pp. 20–23, 25–34.
