= Jon Savage =

English music journalist (born 1953)

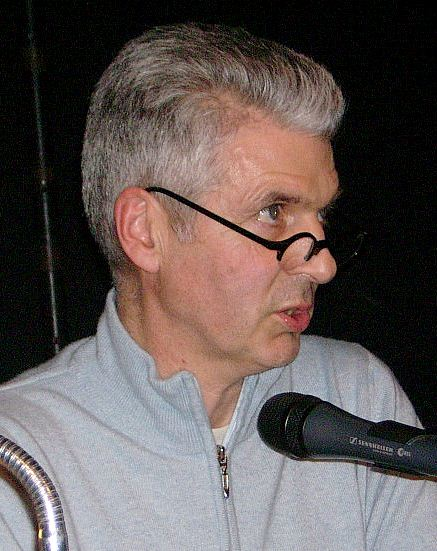
- Savage in 2009
- Born: Jonathan Malcolm Sage; 2 September 1953 (age 73); London, England
- Education: University of Cambridge
- Occupations: Music journalist, broadcaster, writer

Jon Savage (born Jonathan Malcolm Sage, 2 September 1953) is an English writer, broadcaster and music journalist, best known for his book about the Sex Pistols and punk music, England's Dreaming (1991). He contributed an editorial to Sounds magazine's 1977 series on "New Musick", which was later credited as the starting point for "post-punk".

== Early life and education ==
Savage was born in Paddington, London. He read classics at Magdalene College, Cambridge, graduating in 1975.

== Career ==
Becoming a music journalist at the dawn of British punk, he wrote articles on all of the major punk acts, publishing a fanzine called London's Outrage in 1976. A year later he began working as a journalist for the music paper Sounds. Savage interviewed punk, new wave and electronic music artists for Sounds. At that time, he also wrote for the West Coast fanzines Search & Destroy, Bomp! and Slash.

On 26th of November 1977, Sounds magazine published an issue entitled "New Musick" with editorials by Savage and Jane Suck. Savage's editorial on new musick would be cited by music critics Simon Reynolds, David Wilkinson, and Theo Cateforis as the starting point for post-punk as a musical genre. In 1979, Savage moved to Melody Maker, and a year later to the newly founded pop culture magazine The Face. Throughout the decade, Savage wrote for The Observer and the New Statesman, providing high-brow commentary on popular culture.

His book England's Dreaming, a history of the rise of punk rock in the UK and the US in the mid- to late 1970s, was published by Faber and Faber in 1991. It was used as the basis for a television programme, Punk and the Pistols, shown on BBC2 in 1995, and an updated edition in 2001 featured a new introduction which made mention of the Pistols' 1996 reunion and the release of the 2000 Pistols documentary film, The Filth and The Fury. A companion piece, The England's Dreaming Tapes, was published in 2009.

In July 1993, Kurt Cobain gave a dramatically candid interview to Savage for the Observer Magazine in which he freely discussed such controversial topics as Courtney Love, homosexuality, heroin and Cobain's relationship with his Nirvana bandmates.

Savage's book Teenage: The Prehistory of Youth Culture was published in 2007. It is a history of the concept of teenagers, which begins in the 1870s and ends in 1945 and aims to tell the story of youth culture's prehistory, and dates the advent of today's form of "teenagers" to 1945. The book was adapted into a film by Matt Wolf.

In 2015, he published 1966, recalling the popular music and cultural turmoil of that year. He also compiled and wrote the liner notes for a two-disc companion CD, Jon Savage's 1966: The Year the Decade Exploded (Ace Records). As of 2023, he continues to write on punk and other genres in a variety of publications, most notably Mojo magazine and The Observer Music Monthly. He wrote the introduction to Mitch Ikeda's Forever Delayed (2002), an official photobook of the Manic Street Preachers. Savage has appeared in the documentaries Live Forever and NewOrderStory.

Several compilation CDs based on his track lists have also been released, including England's Dreaming (2004) and Meridian 1970 (2005), the latter of which puts forward the argument that 1970 was a high-point for popular music, contrary to critical opinion. He curated the compilation Queer Noises 1961–1978 (2006), a collection of largely overlooked pop songs from that period that carried overt or coded gay messages. His compilations have included Fame, Jon Savage's Secret History Of Post-Punk 78–81 on Caroline True Records and Perfect Motion, Jon Savage's Secret History Of Second Wave Psychedelia 1988–1993. Also a limited double-vinyl release, this collection posited late eighties/early nineties "baggy" music as a slight return to the ethos of 60s psychedelia.

== Publications ==
=== Books ===
- Savage, Jon (1984). The Kinks: the official biography. London: Faber.
- England's Dreaming: Sex Pistols and Punk Rock. Faber and Faber, 1991. ISBN 978-0-571-13975-0.
- Picture Post Idols. London: Collins & Brown, 1992. ISBN 978-1-85585-083-5.
- The Hacienda Must Be Built. International Music Publications, 1992, ISBN 978-0-86359-857-9.
- The Faber Book of Pop. Edited with Hanif Kureishi. Faber and Faber, 1995. ISBN 978-0-571-17980-0.
- Time Travel: From the Sex Pistols to Nirvana – Pop, Media and Sexuality, 1977–96. London: Chatto & Windus, 1996. ISBN 978-0-7011-6360-0.
- Teenage: The Creation of Youth Culture. Viking Books, 2007. ISBN 978-0-670-03837-4.
- 1 Top Class Manager: The Notebooks of Joy Division's Manager, 1978–1980 (Anti-Archivists)
- The England's Dreaming Tapes (University of Minnesota Press, 2010)
- Jon Savage/Linder Sterling: The Secret Public (Boo-Hooray Gallery, 2010)
- Sex Pistols and Punk. Faber and Faber, 2012. ISBN 978-0-571-29654-5).
- Frohman, Jesse (2014). Kurt Cobain: The Last Session. Contributions by Jon Savage and Glenn O'Brien. London: Thames & Hudson.
- 1966: The Year the Decade Exploded. London: Faber & Faber. 2015. ISBN 978-0-571-27762-9.
- This Searing Light, the Sun and Everything Else: Joy Division. Faber and Faber, 2019. ISBN 978-0-571-34537-3.
- Savage, Jon (2024). The Secret Public: How LGBTQ Resistance Shaped Popular Culture (1955–1979). Faber & Faber. ISBN 978-0-571-35837-3.

=== Articles ===
- Savage, Jon (June 1997). "Psychedelia: The 100 Greatest Classics". Mojo. No. 43.
- Savage, Jon (December 2014). "Kurt Cobain's Last Photo Session and Interview, 1993: Part 1 'Very like the Sex Pistols'". Mojo. No. 253. pp. 30–31.

=== Screenplays ===
- Joy Division documentary film, screenwriter, 2008

== Discography ==
- England's Dreaming (Trikont, 2004)
- Meridian 1970 (Forever Heavenly, 2005)
- Queer Noises – From the Closet to the Charts (Trikont, 2006)
- The Shadows of Love – Intense Tamla 1966–1968 (Commercial Marketing, 2006)
- Dreams Come True – Classic Wave Electro 1982–87 (Domino Records, 2008)
- Teenage – The Invention of Youth 1911–1945 (Trikont, 2009)
- Fame – Jon Savage's Secret History of Post Punk 1978–81 (Caroline True Records, 2012)
- Perfect Motion- Jon Savage's Secret History of Second-Wave Psychedelia 1988–93 (Caroline True Records, 2015)
- Punk 45: Sick on You! One Way Spit! (2014)
- Jon Savage's 1965: The Year the Sixties Ignited (Ace Records, 2018)
- Jon Savage's 1966: The Year the Decade Exploded (Ace Records, 2015)
- Jon Savage's 1967 ~ The Year Pop Divided (Ace Records, 2017)
- Jon Savage's 1968 ~ The Year the World Burned (Ace Records, 2018)
- Jon Savage's 1969–1971 ~ Rock Dreams on 45 (Ace Records, 2019)
- Do You Have The Force? Jon Savage's Alternate History Of Electronica 1978–82 (Caroline True Records, 2020)
- Do You Have The Force? Vol2. Jon Savage's Alternate History Of Electronica 1978–82 (Caroline True Records, 2024)

== Bibliography ==
- Haddon, Mimi (2020). What Is Post-Punk?: Genre and Identity in Avant-Garde Popular Music, 1977–82. University of Michigan Press. ISBN 978-0-472-03921-0. Archived from the original on 13 November 2025.
- Wilkinson, David (2016). Post-Punk, Politics and Pleasure in Britain. Springer. ISBN 978-1-137-49780-2.
