= Katrīna Gupalo =

- Born: July 17, 1990 (age 35); Riga, Latvia
- Occupations: Singer; Songwriter; Pianist

Katrina Gupalo (born 17 July 1990) is a Latvian singer, songwriter and pianist, as well as an Actor, radio personality, and social activist. She works primarily in the field of popular music, performing in Latvia and internationally both as a solo artist and as part of various ensembles. She gained wider recognition in Latvia through her original music and her participation in the Latvian Television song competition Radīti mūzikai, where she placed second in 2014, as well as through her active involvement in social and charitable initiatives.

== Biography ==
Gupalo's father was the Ukrainian archaeologist Konstantin Gupalo, and her mother is the Latvian artist Vera Paukša. Her parents met while attending courses in Moscow, lived in Ukraine, and relocated to Riga following the Chernobyl disaster. She studied at the Music Academy of the West in California, the Royal Academy of Music in London, and the Jāzeps Vītols Latvian Academy of Music, and has received recognition at various international competitions, including in Paris, London, and the United States.

== Musical career ==
Gupalo began her professional career in music as a classically trained pianist. She graduated from the Jāzeps Vītols Latvian Academy of Music, where she studied piano with Professor Sergejs Osokins, and from the Music Academy of the West in the United States. She also pursued postgraduate studies at the Royal Academy of Music in London with Professor Christopher Elton. During her career as a pianist, she received awards at international competitions and further developed her skills through participation in international master classes in Europe and the United States.

Gupalo received additional training in vocal performance through private lessons with several teachers and completed courses in acting, directing, and playwriting at the Dramaturgu Theatre. She is known to a wider audience as a popular music performer and songwriter. In 2014, she placed second in the Latvian Television music competition Radīti mūzikai, and in 2024 placed third in the Latvian Television song contest Supernova with the song "The Cat's Song".

Katrina Gupalo began her career as a singer in 2016. In collaboration with pianist Andrejs Osokins, she created two theatrical concert shows, 100 years with Piaf (2015) and After Midnight (2016). After Midnight was presented at the Camden Fringe festival in London. Together with Osokins, she has developed several concert programmes, including Mēness starus stīgo, featuring music by Emīls Dārziņš and Alfrēds Kalniņš and the Latvian-American music programme "From the Baltic to the Atlantic". The duo has performed in Latvia, Finland, and the United States.

In 2018, Gupalo turned her focus to creating original music and, together with the band The Black Birds, released the jazz rock style debut album Gentle and Done (2018). That same year, she was the opening act for British soul singer Emeli Sandé at the Palladium concert hall, embarked on her first concert tour in the United States, performed at the festival Laima Vaikule Rendez-Vous Jūrmala 2018 at Dzintari Concert Hall, and participated in the semi-final of Supernova 2018 with her original song "Intoxicating Caramel".

In 2020, Gupalo released the album 7 skumjas zvaigznes. Katrīna Gupalo Imanta Kalniņa mūzikā, which features 15 songs, including three in English with lyrics by Ojārs Ēriks Kalniņš. The album received significant media attention, was well received by audiences in concert performances, and was positively evaluated by the composer. In collaboration with lyricist Ojārs Ēriks Kalniņš Gupalo released the singles Levitate and "I Can, I Can, I Can" which reached number one in Radio Naba Top 25 chart In 2021, Gupalo released several singles, including Agonija , and Le Reve D’une Sirene (La Vie En Rose).

In 2022, Gupalo created the song "Resistance" and organised its recording and music video production, involving 40 musicians from Latvia, Lithuania, Ukraine, and Russia. The song was nominated for the Latvian Television and Radio annual award Kilograms kultūras. "Resistance" also received international recognition, representing Latvia in the international television marathon SAVE UKRAINE #StopWar, which featured artists such as Imagine Dragons, Craig David, and Salvador Sobral, and was included in the compilation Пiснi перемоги curated by rock music critic Artemy Troitsky, alongside works by Måneskin, Billie Eilish, Sting, and Pink Floyd.

In 2023, Gupalo began collaborating with music producer and jazz pianist Edgars Vilcāns. Their song "Dur prom" reached the Latvian radio charts, remaining in the Top 10 of the most played songs in Latvia for 13 weeks and receiving airplay on nine Latvian radio stations. Further collaborations with Vilcāns resulted in the singles "Kamēr pret sauli kāpu", with lyrics by Māris Čaklais, "Pupiņu zupiņa","Man ar tevi", "Tornado", "Noktirne", "Orhideja", and "Scarlett Challenger", as well as music composed for the Bank of Latvia silver collector coin Ukrainas brīvībai ("Воля").

In 2024, Gupalo, together with co-authors Edgars Vilcāns, Armands Varslavāns, and Evija Smagare, created the song "The Cat’s Song", which placed third in the Latvian Television competition Supernova. The song attracted attention in Latvian media and on international Eurovision fan blogs, where it generated extensive discussion and was described by a significant number of commenters as a potential finalist favourite. A Latvian-language version of the song, titled "Minka nāk", was released subsequently. In 2023, Gupalo, together with Edgars Vilcāns, created the concert programme Dzimtā valoda (Native Language), featuring music by Zigmars Liepiņš, Haralds Sīmanis, Raimonds Pauls, Raimonds Tiguls, and Imants Kalniņš, as well as original compositions by Vilcāns and Gupalo, and Ukrainian and Latvian folk songs. The programme was performed at concert halls in Latvia and internationally, including the Klementinum Mirror Chapel in Prague, the Buda Vigadó in Budapest, the Weltmuseum Wien in Vienna, the Nieuwe Kerk in The Hague, the Conservatorio Santa Cecilia in Rome, the Ilkhom Theater in Tashkent, Vilnius University, and the Astana Opera.

== Acting and modelling ==
Gupalo has participated in several film projects and has also worked as a model. In 2021, she portrayed a circus artist in the film Silence Sets You Free. In 2022, she played the role of Mēnesnīca in the film Mazā Mula lielajā mākslas pasaulē. She starred in the short film Le rêve d'une sirène, in which she also performed the theme song "La Vie En Rose"; the film received awards at the Paris International Short Festival and the New York International Women Festival, and was selected for the semi-finals and official selections of several international festivals. In 2024, Gupalo appeared as a singer in the film Dumpis. In addition to acting, Gupalo has worked as a model, taking part in photo shoots for the Le Vendome Riga collection in 2022, the photography project D/Sievietes laikmets by Sergejs Kondrašins in 2024, the Līgavām bridal fashion show, and other projects.

Professional work in cultural management and production Gupalo is the founder and artistic director of the concert agency Aira Laiviņa Artists, and a co-founder and organiser of the Osokins Freedom Festival. She has worked as an event producer at the Rūmene Manor concert hall KŪTS, and is also the founder and organiser of the Enkurfests festival.

== Radio, television, and event hosting ==
Gupalo has been active in radio broadcasting and event hosting. In 2023, she hosted the programme EHR LIFE on European Hit Radio. In 2025, she joined Radio SWH and SWH TV as a DJ and on-air personality, and also created the author-led segment Ofisa Fitness. Since 2022, Gupalo has also worked as an event host, leading various cultural and entertainment events, including the largest bridal fashion show in the Baltic states, Līgavām, as well as events organised by Latvian Radio.

== Charitable and civic activity ==
Gupalo has initiated and implemented several projects in support of Ukraine, including Latvia For Ukraine: Resistance, the Osokins Freedom Festival for Ukraine, the charitable campaign "A Jeep for a Ukrainian Actor-Sniper", the donation of the Freedom Piano "Україна" to the Museum of the Popular Front of Latvia, and the project Varakuta, which brought together Ukrainian women singers who were war refugees in Latvia and supported their activities through the formation of a Vocal ensemble and the organisation and promotion of concerts.

== Awards and nominations ==
- 2000 – First prize at the competition Talants Latvijai
- 2000 – Teodors Reiters Prize
- 2011 – First prize at the 17th Yamaha Scholarship competition in Riga
- 2011 – First prize and Special Jury Award at the 11th International Alexander Scriabin Piano Competition in Paris
- 2012 – First prize at the international piano competition Outstanding Teachers in Kyustendil, Bulgaria
- 2012 – Diploma and Special Prize for the interpretation of Sergei Feinberg's Piano Sonata No. 6 at the 5th International Alexander Scriabin Piano Competition, Moscow State Tchaikovsky Conservatory
- 2013 – Oļģerts Zīverss Award
- 2014 – Second place in the Latvian Television competition Radīti mūzikai
- 2015 – Second place at the Else Cross Contemporary Music Competition in London
- 2022 – Nominee for Pastaiga 2022 – Outstanding Women of Latvia
- 2023 – Nominee for the Latvian Television and Latvian Radio annual award Kilograms Kultūras 2023
- 2023 – Nominee for Pastaiga 2023 – Outstanding Women of Latvia
- 2023 – Awarded the Order of the Three Stars (Latvian: Triju Zvaigžņu ordenis) – the highest civilian order awarded for meritorious service to Latvia
- 2024 – Third place in the Latvian Television competition Supernova 2024

== Personal life ==
Gupalo was born in Riga and was baptised on 4 May, Day of the Restoration of Latvian Independence. For nine years, until 2023, her partner was the pianist Andrejs Osokins. In 2025, she married musician Edgars Vilcāns.
