= Rock music in Latvia =

Latvian rock has been an important part of Latvia's music scene since the 1980s, when it was a part of the discontent with Soviet rule.

The city of Liepāja has an especially active rock scene. Līvi, Credo and Remix are from Liepāja, as are rock composers Imants Kalniņš and Zigmars Liepiņš.

In the 1980s, Pērkons played a pompous sort of hard rock that was popular with audiences. Underground studio-based groups NSRD and Dzeltenie Pastnieki introduced extensive use of electronic instrumentation, while Zig Zag and Aurora brought guitar-based post-punk tendencies (though about ten years after the fact).

In 1988, rock opera Lāčplēsis by Zigmars Liepiņš and Māra Zālīte, based on the national epic, became a hit, with Igo (Rodrigo Fomins) in the title role of Lāčplēsis.

Inokentijs Mārpls, Baložu Pilni Pagalmi and Sirke are among the most important acts within the later alternative scene.

In the 2000s Olive Mess reached international success in the progressive rock scene.
