= Edgars Vilcāns =

- Born: January 13, 2000 (age 26); Kijiv, Ukraine
- Genres: Jazz, Pop music
- Occupations: Composer; Music producer; Arranger; Pianist

Edgars Vilcāns, also known as Edwolf, (born 13 January 2000) is a Ukrainian-Latvian composer, music producer, arranger, and jazz pianist. He works in both the Latvian and Ukrainian music venues, collaborating with various musicians and participating in concert projects. He gained wider recognition in Latvia following his participation in the charitable campaign "Dod pieci!".

== Biography ==
Vilcāns was born in Kyiv into a Ukrainian - Latvian family. His father is the Latvian lawyer Ivars Vilcāns, and his mother is the Ukrainian theatre scholar, producer, art project curator, and novelist Laura Vilcāne.. He studied at the Riga Cathedral Choir School Although he spent his childhood in Latvia, the family later relocated to Kyiv, where Vilcāns continued his education and further developed his musical skills. He graduated from the Lysenko Kyiv Music School, specialising in clarinet, and later completed his studies at the Reinhold Glière Kyiv Municipal Academy of Music, earning a bachelor’s degree in jazz piano. Prior to the Russian military invasion of Ukraine, Vilcāns lived and worked in Kyiv. Following the outbreak of the war, he relocated to Latvia with his mother and brother, where he has continued his professional activities in music.

== Music career ==
In Ukraine, Vilcāns worked at the large music recording studio MOZGI Entertainment, where, as a music producer, arranger, and composer, he collaborated with various Ukrainian artists, including Potap, Nastya Kamenskykh, and Nadya Dorofeeva. He has also worked in concerts and studio sessions with the Japanese - Ukrainian jazz saxophonist Kenta Igarashi, and served as music producer, touring pianist, and co-songwriter for the well-known Ukrainian singer Petro Chornyi.

In Latvia, Vilcāns has actively collaborated with musician Katrīna Gupalo, jointly creating concert programmes and original music. He has also worked with other Latvian artists, including Māra Upmane-Holšteine, DJ Rudd, Grēta Grantiņa, Marta, Būu, Laika Upe, Agnese Stengrevica, Diona Liepiņa, Ilze Rijniece, Agnese Rakovska, Deniss Griezis, and Alex Silver. Vilcāns has also worked as a commissioned producer, arranger, and composer for Universal Music Group Latvia.

== Music production ==
Edgars Vilcāns has collaborated with a wide range of Latvian and Ukrainian artists both in recording studios and on stage. Songs produced and co-written by Vilcāns have achieved notable results in the Latvian Television song competition Supernova. In 2024, Vilcāns was a co-author and music producer of two entries that placed in the final of Supernova: “The Cat’s Song”, performed by Katrina Gupalo, which finished in third place, and “For the Show”, performed by Alex Silver, which finished in fourth place. In 2025, the composition “Scarlett Challenger”, co-written with Katrina Gupalo, reached the semi-final stage of the competition. In 2022, Vilcāns was a co-author and music producer of Katrina Gupalo’s song “Dur Prom”, which became a radio hit and remained in the Latvian Top 10 most-played songs for 13 weeks, receiving airplay on nine Latvian radio stations.

In 2023, Vilcāns created the arrangement for the opening performance of the Latvian Radio annual music award ceremony Muzikālā banka, titled “Ой на горі та й женці жнуть / Dzimtā valodā”. The performance featured well-known Latvian musicians, including the chamber orchestra Daugavpils Sinfonietta, the orchestra and choir Daugava, and artists such as Dons, Aija Andrejeva, Ivo Fomins, Tautumeitas, Shipsea, Jānis Aišpurs, Aminata, Juris Kaukulis, Katrīna Gupalo, and the group Varakuta.

== Solo project as Edwolf ==
In 2026, Vilcāns released his debut EP In Search Of Home under the stage name Edwolf. The seven-track release addresses themes of home, displacement, migration, and personal identity, drawing on the artist’s experiences of living and traveling in multiple countries, including Latvia, Ukraine, the United Kingdom, the United States, and Asia.

The EP’s cover artwork was photographed in February 2022 in Liepāja, Latvia, which served as a temporary place of refuge for Vilcāns’ family following the beginning of Russia’s full-scale invasion of Ukraine. Musically, the EP incorporates elements of pop, R&B, soul, and electronic dance music. In Search Of Home features electronic compositions alongside recorded vocals and piano performed by Vilcāns. Guest contributors include singers Evija Smagare (IVIYAN), Katrina Gupalo, Ilze Rijniece, Sintija Aizupiete, and Jānis Aizupietis; guitarists Jānis Pastars and Armands Varslavāns; and Japanese saxophonist Kenta Igarashi. According to Vilcāns, the EP was created without the use of artificial intelligence, with all music production and visual materials completed manually.

== Concert activity and other projects ==
In 2023, together with Katrina Gupalo, Edgars Vilcāns created the concert programme Dzimtā valoda ("Native Language"). The programme features music by Zigmar Liepiņš, Haralds Sīmanis, Raimonds Pauls, Raimonds Tiguls, and Imants Kalniņš, original compositions by Vilcāns and Gupalo, as well as Ukrainian and Latvian folk songs. It was performed in numerous concert halls across Latvia and internationally, including the Klementinum Mirror Chapel in Prague, Budai Vigadó in Budapest, Weltmuseum Wien in Vienna, Nieuwe Kerk in The Hague, Conservatorio Santa Cecilia in Rome, Ilkhom Theater in Tashkent, Vilnius University, and the Astana Opera. In 2023, Vilcāns composed music for the Ukrainian - Latvian directors' theatre production Es gaidu… ("I Am Waiting…") at Ģertrūdes ielas teātris in Riga. Vilcāns has also collaborated with Katrina Gupalo on the music created for the Bank of Latvia's silver collector coin For Ukraine's Freedom ("Воля").

== Public and charitable activity ==
In 2022, Edgars Vilcāns joined the Latvian public media charity marathon Dod pieci! as one of the DJs and on-air personality, with a particular focus on supporting Ukrainian refugees and children affected by the war. In the same year, he participated in several Ukraine support initiatives, including Latvia For Ukraine: Resistance and the Osokins Freedom Festival for Ukraine. In 2023, together with Katrina Gupalo, Vilcāns co-organised the charity initiative "A Jeep for a Ukrainian Actor - Sniper", aimed at providing direct support to a Ukrainian defender.

== Personal life ==
Edgars Vilcāns is married to Latvian musician Katrīna Gupalo, with whom he also collaborates on various creative projects.
