= Talgat Batalov =

Uzbekistani theater director

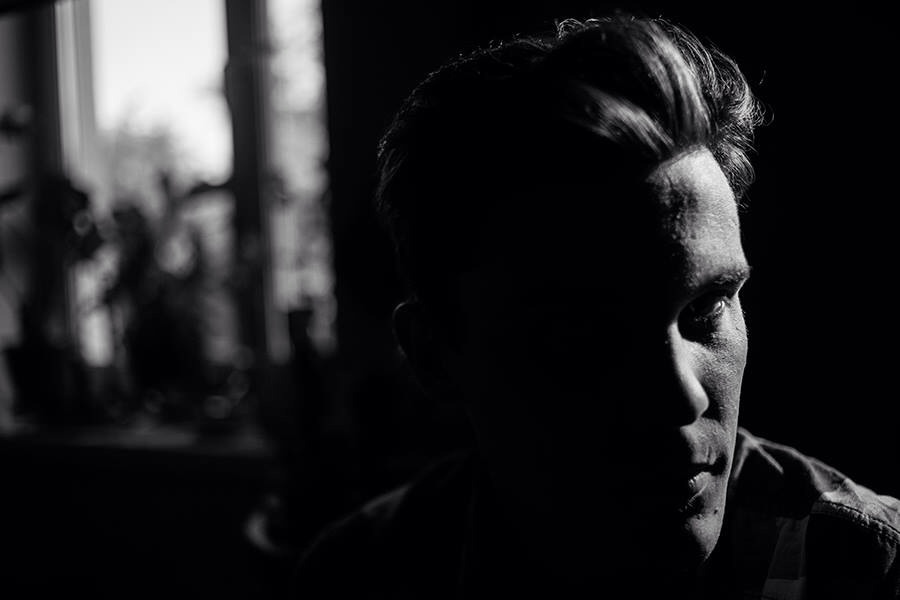
- Born: Talgat Damirovich Batalov; 4 May 1987 (age 38); Tashkent, USSR [now Uzbekistan]
- Occupation(s): actor, theater director

Talgat Damirovich Batalov (Russian: Талгат Дамирович Баталов; born May 4, 1987, Tashkent) is an Uzbekistani and Russian theater director and actor. Multiple nominee for the Golden Mask Award.

== Biography ==
Talgat was born in Tashkent; his father was an artist, his mother an engineer.

He studied at the Uzbekistan State Institute of Arts and Culture on faculty of directing film, theater and TV. He worked in the Ilkhom Theatre governed by Mark Weil, and, in particular, he directed the video series staged by Weill Oresteia. In 2007, he moved to Moscow, studied at the VGIK at the scenario faculty (workshop of Rustam Ibragimbekov).

Since 2009, regularly collaborates with the Moscow Theatre.doc.

Talgat Batalov is a member of various theater laboratories in Moscow, Yaroslavl, Tashkent, etc.
