= Igo (singer) =

Latvian singer, poet and composer (born 1962)

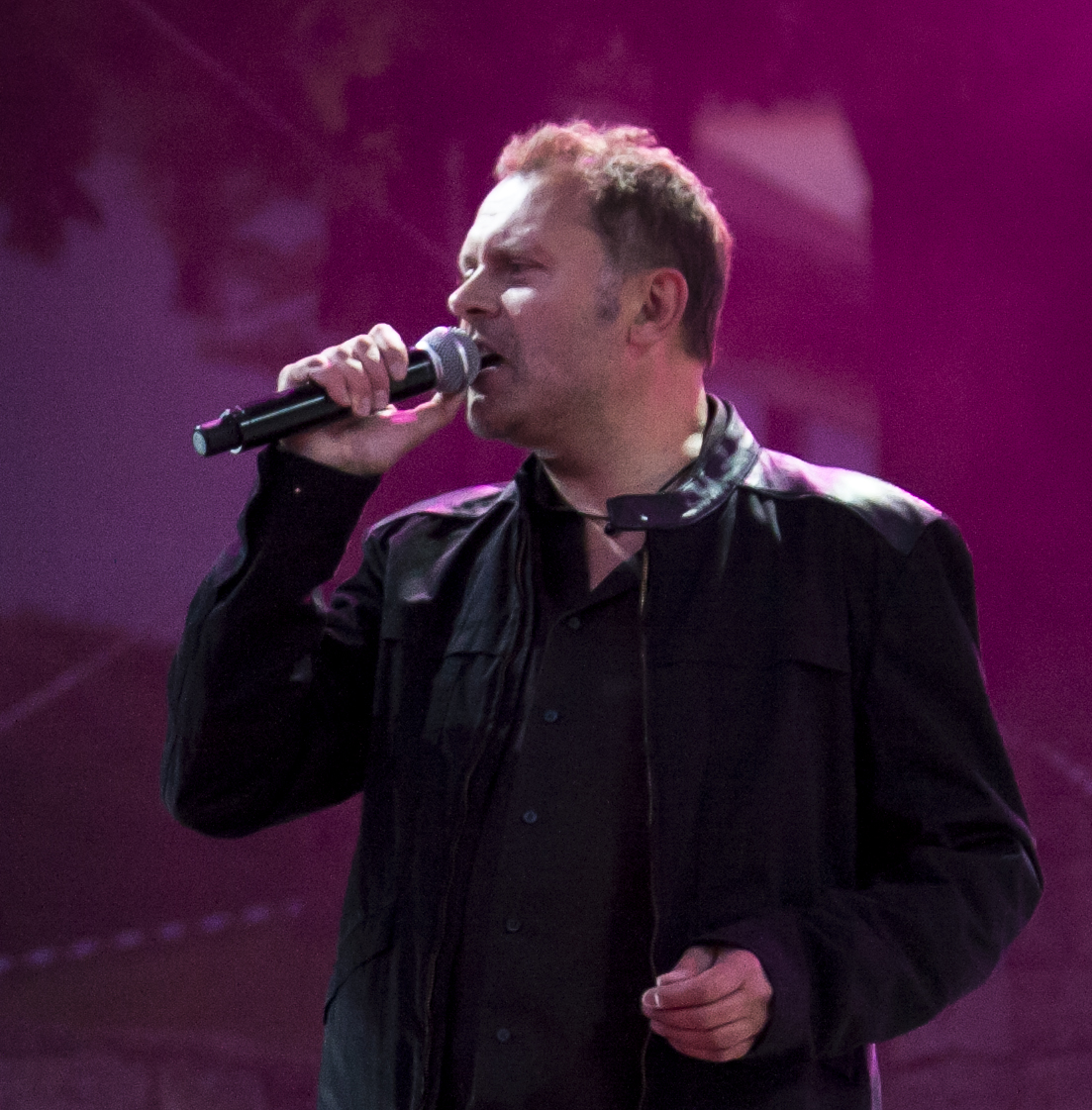
- 2012

Background information
- Born: Rodrigo Fomins; 29 June 1962 (age 64); Liepāja, Latvian Soviet Socialist Republic, USSR
- Genres: Pop; rock; jazz
- Occupations: Singer, songwriter, record producer, musician
- Instruments: Vocals, violin
- Years active: 1978–present
- Labels: Melodiya; Mikrofona Ieraksti; Antena; IgoMM
- Website: www.igo-mm.lv

Rodrigo Fomins (born 29 June 1962), better known by his stage name Igo, is a Latvian singer, poet and composer of rock and other music styles.

== Biography ==
His mother is Irina Tīre, an artist and photographer, whilst his brother, Ivo Fomins, is also a singer.

Igo studied playing the violin and is a singer and producer. One of the most popular singers in the 1980s, he was the lead singer for Latvian bands Corpus, Livi and Remix and in the jazz quartet Liepājas kvartets.

In 1986, Igo won the Grand Prix during The Soviet Young Singers Competition known as "Jūrmala-86" with the song "Грибной дождь" and took part in the TV festival "Song of the Year" in Moscow with "Путь к свету" (composed by Raimonds Pauls and Ilya Reznik) as well he got 2nd Place and The Audience Main Prize in The International Singer Festival "Man and Sea" in Rostock.

In the beginning of the independence recovery stage of Latvia, in the year 1988 Igo performed the role of Lacplesis by the workbook of Māra Zālīte, in the rock opera "Lāčplēsis" by Zigmars Liepiņš.

Igo has made recordings together with such music bands as Līvi and Remix.

In the 1990s, he started a solo career. He collaborated with composers like Raimonds Pauls, Imants Kalniņš and Zigmars Liepiņš. In 1997 he returned with a major role in an opera "The Hunchback of Notre-Dame" (Latvian: "Parīzes Dievmātes katedrāle") by Zigmars Liepiņš.

In 1989, after listening to Latvian rock bands, pop music producers from the US in Riga chose "Remix" to offer new band songs to the American audience. From 1990 to 1991, Igo stayed intermittently in the US with the group "Rīga", previously the group "Remix". In the US, Igo trains his vocal talents in New York with vocal teacher Katie Agresta, works with American producers, develops his English language, and writes song lyrics.

In 1997 Igo issued an album "Savādā pasaule" ("Strange World") dedicated to the victims of Talsi tragedy, in which nine children were killed when a fire truck basket broke during a summer public fire truck demonstration. He included songs by Jānis Lūsēns and lyrics by Normunds Belskis. In January 1998 Igo issued the best song selection "Tas ir Igo" ("That's Igo") on two CDs, but in 1999 the first solo album "Bet dzīvē viss ir savādāk..." ("Everything Different in Life...") came out by Igo.

In May 2000, Igo had a major car accident which resulted in a national campaign dubbed "Turies, Igo!" (meaning hold on, Igo) for his support and cover of his medical costs. Igo fought for his life and he was capable of a good recovery.

In 2001 he issued the next album "Trīs dienas" ("Three Days"). In 2005 Igo issued an album called "Mirkļa liecinieks" ("A Witness of a Moment"). The album "Spēle" ("The Game"), which was issued in 2008 gathers up a 10-year song selection made in various recording studios and has been supplemented with live concerts and familiar song recordings in English. In 2009 Igo presented the album "Ieelpots" ("Breathed In") and a concert programme, which took place in castles and country seats of Latvia. In 2010 Igo made a recording to stories of Michail Zoščenko, and issued an album "Uguns" ("Fire"), where the lyrics have been written by Igo and music have been written by Jānis Strazds. In 2012 Igo issued a concert recording on DVD of the concert programme "Ieelpots" ("Breathed In"), as well as the album "Esmu mājās" ("I'm Home"), which was dedicated to Kuldiga. The last album in 2012 is a Christmas song selection in various foreign languages "Pasaule Ziemassvētku krāsās" ("The World in Christmas Colors"). In 2013, as a sequel of the started four elements cycle "Fire. Earth. Water. Air.", Igo cooperating with the composer Valts Pūce made a concert programme "Zeme" ("Earth") and issued a CD.

=== Literature, radio ===
In November 2006, he launched a collection of poems under the title Bezgalīgs tuvums. This poem collection has been re-issued the 3rd time. In 2008 Igo issued his 2nd book "Viss palēnām notiek". There he included stories and poems that are reflected with illustrations by Igo.

From 2007 to 2012 Igo directed car broadcasts "Izvēlies un stāsti" ("Choose And Tell") and "Domāts, Darīts" ("Think It, Do It") in such broadcasting stations as "Latvia Radio 1" and "Latvian Radio". Igo is actively performing in other socially responsible projects as well. For many years Igo together with the Hepatitis Union organized arrangements where he shared information with the society about Hepatitis C virus. A lot of attention he devoted to the problem solution and ID promotion of the Liepaja Holy Trinity Cathedral.

=== Social activities ===
His organized activities in Jūrkalne became a strong tradition which included the holiday of tourism opening season and joint work, the meeting of Summer Solstice, Apple Party, and An International Art Plenary, which became a significant event in Courland, especially in the Suitu wife cultural field that was included in the UNESCO List of Intangible Cultural Heritage in Need of Urgent Safeguarding.

=== Tours ===
Igo always tried to celebrate his stage anniversaries splendidly. The 10th anniversary was opened with four-concert series in Arena Riga, and it became a special event in those days of the music life of Latvia. As an honour for the 10th anniversary two concerts were organized at the Latvian National Opera together with the composers like Raimonds Pauls, Imants Kalniņš, Zigmars Liepiņš, Jānis Lūsēns, and Uldis Marhilēvičs. In 2008, a concert tour was dedicated to Igo for his 30-year tribute on the stage. There were 15 concerts during the tour in various towns of Latvia, and the closing concert was held at Arena Riga. In 2012 Igo celebrated his 50 anniversary. Concerts were performed with the participation of composers like Raimonds Pauls, Zigmars Liepiņš, Valts Pūce, the directed string orchestra by Andris Veismanis, opera singer Evija Martinsone, as well with singers like Zigfrīds Muktupāvels, Andris Ērglis, Rolands Ūdris, Artis Dvarionas, kokles player Laima Jansone, music band Remix, and other familiar musicians at the Dzintari Concert Hall, Cēsis Castle Park, and at the Liepāja "Put vejini" open-air stage.

After winning The New Singer Competition "Jūrmala-86" until 1989, when Igo went to the U.S., a broad concert cooperation took part at that time, and popularity in Russia as well. The song "Путь к свету" ("Road To Light") written by Raimonds Pauls became the song of the Year and was a symbol of Igo as well, and it is still popular in Russia nowadays. In 2012 when Igo included Tashkent, Saint Petersburg and Moscow in his concert cooperation, and also made song recordings in Russian as well. These songs entered many Russian broadcasting station tops, besides the song "Будь со мной" (Be with me) climbed up high in the broadcasting station tops.

Igo sings in Latvian, Russian, English, German and Estonian and has had concerts in Latvia, Lithuania, Estonia, Russia, Ukraine, Georgia, Armenia, Germany, Austria, Poland, Finland, Sweden, Norway, Uzbekistan, Belgium, Luxembourg, Greece, and in the U.S..

== Discography ==
=== In Līvi ===
- Aprīļa pilieni (LP, 1985)
- Iedomu pilsēta (LP, 1986)
- Iedomu pilsēta / Aprīļa pilieni (CD, 2006)

=== In Remix ===
- Vēstule (LP, 1987)
- Remix (Поёт Иго) (LP, 1988)
- Pie laika (LP, 1990)
- Remix Gold (CD, 1995 and 2005)

=== Duet with Ieva Akuratere ===
- "Klusums starp mums" (LP, 1991, CD, 2003)

=== Albums ===
- Savādā pasaule (CD, 1997)
- Dželsomīno piedzīvojumi Melu zemē (MC, 1998)
- Tas ir Igo (2 CD, 1998)
- Bet dzīvē viss ir savādāk (CD, 1999)
- Trīs dienas (CD, 2001)
- Kā maigi dzelošs rožu krūms (CD, 2004)
- Mirkļa liecinieks (CD, 2005)
- Spēle (CD, 2008)
- Ieelpots (CD, 2009)
- Igo runā Mihaila Zoščenko stāstus (CD, 2010)
- Uguns (CD, 2010)
- Esmu mājās (CD, 2012)
- Pasaule Ziemassvētku krāsās (CD, 2012)
- Zeme (CD, 2013)
- igo/hermanis/dziesmas (CD, 2020)

=== DVD ===
- Remix (2009)
- Ieelpots (2012)
