= Balāde par gulbi =

1983 song performed by Pērkons

Balāde par gulbi (English: Ballad about a Swan) is a song by Latvian Rock band Pērkons, written by Māris Melgalvis (lyrics) and Juris Kulakovs (music) in 1979 and recorded in 1983. Written while Latvia was occupied by USSR, it is noted for its anti-soviet subtext that references deaths of soviet leaders in early 1980s, which were usually mourned by broadcasting Tchaikovsky's Swan Lake. The opening part of the song deals with a crow with no sense of humor sitting on a fresh grave and forcing her opinion on everyone. Most of the song dwells on the stupidity of killing a swan, but in the end resolves that the swan is so red that one cannot help killing it.

== Lyrics ==
Kārna vārna
Uz slapa kapa
Man savu patiesību ķērc
Vai tiešām viņa neattapa ka viss tas - tikai joka pēc
Ak vai cik stulbi
Ir nosist gulbi
Bet stulbāk vēl ja vēlāk žēl
Tad ir tik velnišķīgi stulbi—ik rietā sarkans gulbis kvēl
Tik stulbi kvēl
Ka jāsit vēl

Translation:

A skinny crow
On a wet grave
Croaking her truth to me
Didn't she really realize that it all is just for fun?
Oh, how stupid
It is to beat a swan to death
But even more stupid if you regret it later
It is so devilishly stupid—in each sunset a red swan glows
Glows so stupidly
That one has to beat it again

Balāde par gulbi
30 second sample from Pērkons' "Balāde par gulbi"
