= The Hobos =

Latvian musical group

- Origin: Liepāja, Latvia
- Genres: Rock
- Years active: 1999 – present
- Label: Platforma Records
- Website: Official Website

The Hobos are a Latvian rock group formed in 1999 by Rolands Ūdris (vocals), Mārtiņš Burkēvics (bass guitar), Egons Kronbergs (guitar) and Vilnis Krieviņš (drums). Their debut album was hailed by many prominent critics as the best thing to come out of the Latvian music scene in the last decade.

The Hobos gained a wide following with their singles "Christian (I’m Gonna Be)", "Walk All Night", "Flying Away" and "Don’t Forget". Characterized by American rock and folk music influences and thought-out lyrics, The Hobos were considered one of the biggest names on the post-soviet rock scene.

== History ==
The spiritual guru of the band and principal composer of most of their songs Rolands Ūdris led an adventurous life before deciding to settle in his homeland and form a band. Having traveled and sung on the streets all around the world from New York City to Hong Kong, Rolands came back to Latvia in 1999 and decided to form a group of his own.

After going into studio with his friend and the band's bass player Mārtiņš Burkevics, Rolands made the acquaintance of guitar player Egons Kronbergs and one of the most experienced drummers in Latvia – Vilnis Krieviņš from Līvi fame. Together they jammed for a while and finally decided to form a band citing their only goal as "making good music".

At first The Hobos were forced to play in local clubs, trying to present their material for a larger audience, but finally got lucky when the members of another Latvian band – Brainstorm – were in the audience. This opened the doors to the recording studio and by the end of 1999 The Hobos were ready to release their debut album Numbvision, which in turn produced their first hit single "Christian (I'm Gonna Be)". The catchy rock rhythm and sharp lyrics piloted The Hobos to major success – Numbvision reached Gold in Latvia and Lithuania and was nominated for the best Latvian rock album of the year.

Encouraged by this success, The Hobos went back to writing new material, which was finally recorded in the legendary Abbey Road Studios with the help of producer Nick Webb (Queen, Pink Floyd, Duran Duran and John Lennon). The album – titled Perfect Solution – saw the daylight in 2001 and almost immediately repeated the success of their debut. The same year the band began touring outside Latvia gaining some degree of fame in Northern Europe.

2002 saw the release of their third album Flashback Mornings which encompassed a new sound for the band. The Hobos started to experiment with different electronic effects producing a somewhat unusual rocking sound. Both singles – "Walk All Night" and "Flying Away" – received some major airplay and led the band to receiving yet another "Latvian Rock Album of the Year" award. The next year was spent entirely on touring.

Fans had to wait until 2004 to get their hands on a new studio release from The Hobos, but when it finally came out, it came out with a bang. Radio Jah Jah was the first double album of the group and the first double album of any Latvian popular music for almost a decade. As Rolands Ūdris told the press: "Radio Jah Jah is the radio that plays in our heads. And because of that we decided to pay homage to some of our favorite musicians." The album featured one CD of original material and a second disk that was compiled from many different cover versions, including J. J. Cale's "Cocaine", Bob Marley's "I Shot the Sheriff" and Simon and Garfunkel's "Cecilia". This release was highly praised both for the new direction The Hobos were taking with their own songs and for some of the covers.

After the release of Radio Jah Jah, The Hobos decided to take some time to do other projects. Vilnis Krieviņš went back to play with the legendary Latvian hard rock band Līvi. Rolands Ūdris and Egons Kronbergs formed a side-project called U.K. and released the album KU. Finally, in year 2006 the band went back to studio and a new album is expected sometime in 2009.

In the January 17, 2016 the band vocalist Rolands Ūdris was hit by a driver in the Riga, capital city of Latvia and for 5 weeks he stayed in coma. He never fully recovered from the injuries.

== Members ==
- Rolands Ūdris: vocals
- Egons Kronbergs: guitar
- Mārtiņš Burkēvics: bass guitar
- Vilnis Krieviņš: drums

== Discography ==
Year of Release	Title
1999	Numbvision
2001	Perfect Solution
2002	Flashback Mornings
2004	Radio Jah Jah
2015	The Hobos
