= Nelūgtie viesi =

Series about detectives

- Genre: Crime drama; Mystery; Thriller
- Created by: Vlads Kovaļovs
- Showrunner: Vlads Kovaļovs
- Starring: Andris Daugaviņš; Niklāvs Kurpnieks; Gerda Embure; Mārtiņš Kalita; Rēzija Kalniņa
- Music by: Iļja Kovaļovs
- Country of origin: Latvia
- Original language: Latvian
- No. of seasons: 3
- No. of episodes: 24

Production
- Executive producers: Vadims Zaikovskis, Ļesja Bogačova
- Producer: Lelde Kovaļova
- Production location: Kandava, Latvia
- Cinematography: Toms Zarāns
- Camera setup: Single-camera
- Running time: 45–50 minutes
- Production companies: Tet Studio, Lelde Kovaļova

Original release
- Network: Tet TV+
- Release: 26 January 2023 – March 2025

Nelūgtie viesi (English: The Uninvited Guests) is Latvian crime drama television series that premiered on January 26, 2023, on the streaming platform Tet TV+. Created and directed by Vlads Kovaļovs and produced by Lelde Kovaļova, the series follows a pair of investigators uncovering complex crimes in small Latvian town where every one are telling lies and no one is truly innocent. The show became the most-watched original series on Tet TV+ in 2023 and received a nomination for Best TV Series at Latvia's national film awards, Lielais Kristaps.

== Plot ==
In season 1, the plot centers on the mysterious murder of 27-year-old actor Valters Pētersons, found dead after his birthday party at a secluded guest house in the woods. All attendees become suspects, but the case is complicated by the fact that none of them are telling the complete truth. The investigation is led by two very different detectives – Ričards, a seasoned but retired officer returning for one last case, and Oskars, a young idealist determined to make the world a better place.

In season 2 (2024), a new crime unfolds during a masquerade ball in Kandava, where a young woman named Emīlija Broka – daughter of an influential businessman – is murdered. As the case escalates and more secrets are revealed, the detectives realise that none of the guests are willing to reveal the full truth.

In season 3 (2025), Ričards and Oskar's investigate the disappearance of 15-year-old girl named Līva, which leads them into dangerous territory involving organized crime and human trafficking, forcing them to confront their own limits.

== Cast and characters ==
- Andris Daugaviņs as Ričards – a veteran detective, returning on duty
- Niklāvs Kurpnieks as Oskars – an ambitious young detective
- Mārtiņs Kalita as Uģis – their colleague at the local police station
- Gerda Embure as Amanda – Ričards daughter, who becomes involved in the investigation
- Rēzija Kalniņa as Rasma – Oskars strict and sharp-tongued mother
- Andrejs Alens as Marks – a suspect in Valters murder, hiding dark secrets
- Normunds Laizāns as Imants – a party guest and friend of the victim
- Einars Repše as Andris Broks – Emīlijas father, an influential businessman

== Production ==
=== Development ===
The series was created and directed by Vlads Kovaļovs, with production led by Lelde Kovaļova. Cinematography was done by Tomas Zarāns, and an original score, composed by Iļja Kovaļovs, including a full soundtrack released in 2024. The project is produced by Tet Studio in collaboration with Lelde Kovaļovas producing company, involving a team of professionals from Latvia, Lithuania, Ukraine and Poland. Filming took place mainly in the town of Kandava, using both real locations and custom-built sets.

=== Opening credits ===
The opening sequence of Nelūgtie viesi features a slow, atmospheric pan through a dense forest at dusk, accompanied by an ominous, minimalist score composed by Iļja Kovaļovs. The series title fades in gradually, letter by letter, using a rough-cut serif font resembling scratched wood or carved initials. Each letter is briefly overlaid with blurred, symbolic imagery, such as a broken mask, a flickering flashlight, or a bloodstained photograph, subtly referencing plot elements in that episode. The credits conclude with a wide aerial shot of the forest clearing, echoing the show's recurring theme of isolation and hidden truth.

== Episodes ==
Nelūgtie viesi series overview
| Season | Episodes | Originally released |
|---|---|---|
| 1 | 9 | January 26, 2023 |
| 2 | 9 | January 31, 2024 |
| 3 | 9 | February 2025 |

== Reception and awards ==
The series quickly became the most-watched original production in 2023 on Tet TV+ and was praised for its gripping mystery and engaging characters. It was nominated for Best TV Series at the Lielais Kristaps Latvian national Films Awards. Critics especially praised season 1 of its pacing and atmosphere. Season 2 received more mixed reviews, with some critics noting a shift toward character drama over the central mystery. However, the show retained a strong audience and cemented its place as one of Latvia's most successful recent series.
