= Navoi Theater =

Opera house in Tashkent, Uzbekistan

Coordinates: 41°18′33″N 69°16′18″E

- Uzbek: Alisher Navoiy nomidagi davlat akademik katta teatri
- Navoi theater in 2023
- Full name: Alisher Navoi State Academic Grand Theatre
- Address: 28 Zarafshon street Tashkent; Uzbekistan
- Capacity: 1,400
- Public transit: 22, 51, 67; Mustaqilliq Maidoni

Construction
- Opened: 1947
- Architect: Alexei Shchusev

Website
- www.dakt.uz

The Navoi Theater, officially the Alisher Navoi State Academic Grand Theatre, (Note: Uzbek: Alisher Navoiy nomidagi davlat akademik katta teatri) is a national opera theater in central Tashkent, built as one of the first modern theaters in the region.

== Overview ==
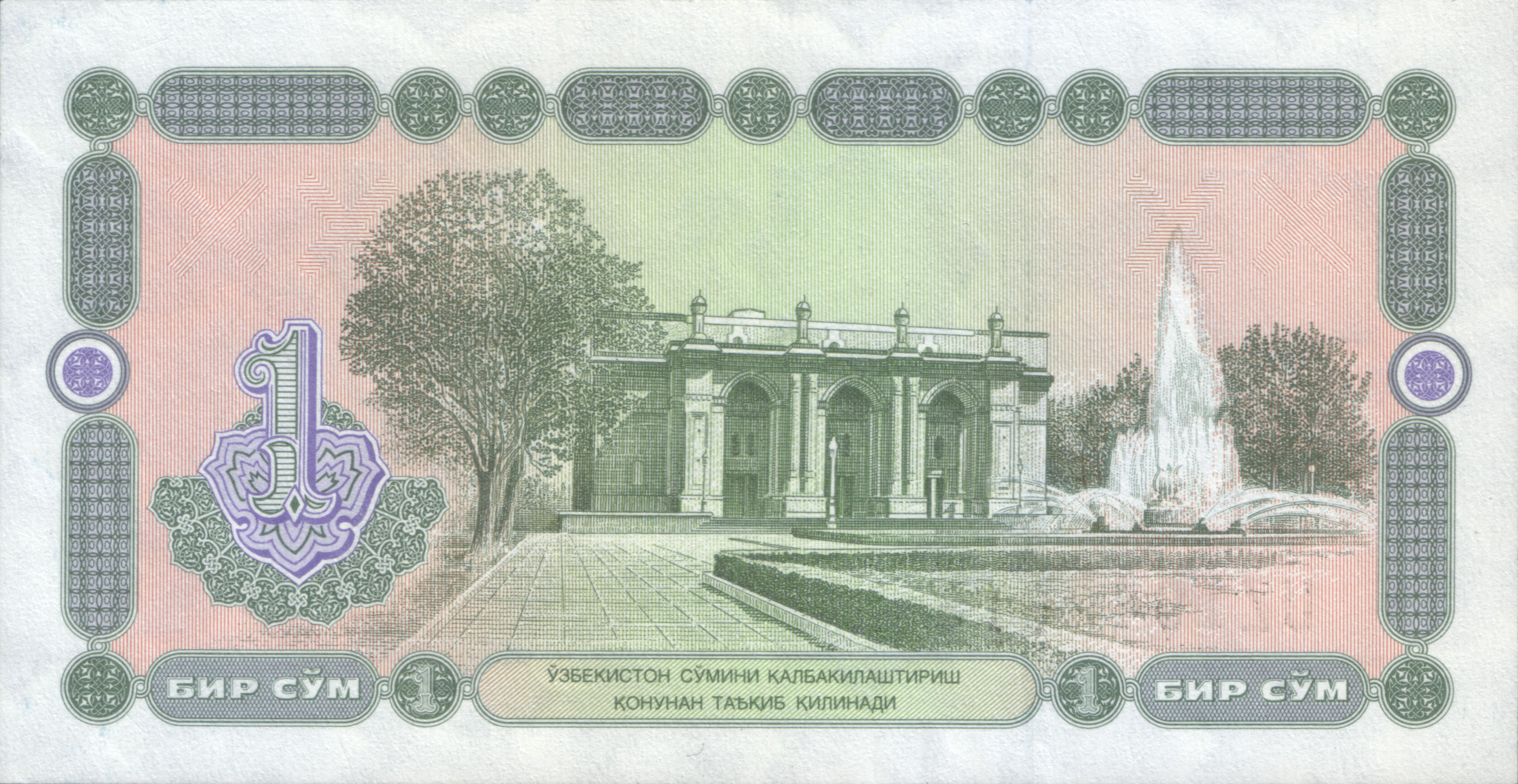
Navoi Theater, on a 1 soum note.

In 1929, amateurs of concert-ethnographic group led by M. Kari-Yakubov was established and later founded the professional theatre. In 1939 it was renamed to the Uzbek State Opera and Ballet Theatre, and in March 1948 it was united with Russian theatre and called as the State Opera and Ballet Theatre named after Alisher Navoi. Later, in 1959 the theatre obtained the status of Academic theatre and in 1966 – the status of Bolshoi Theatre,

Designed by Alexey Shchusev, the theater was built in 1942-1947, in part with forced labor. It opened to the public in November, 1947, celebrating the 500th anniversary of the birth of Alisher Navoi, the greatest representative of Chagatai literature. The theater has a capacity of 1,400 spectators. The main stage covers 540 square meters.

== Forced labor ==
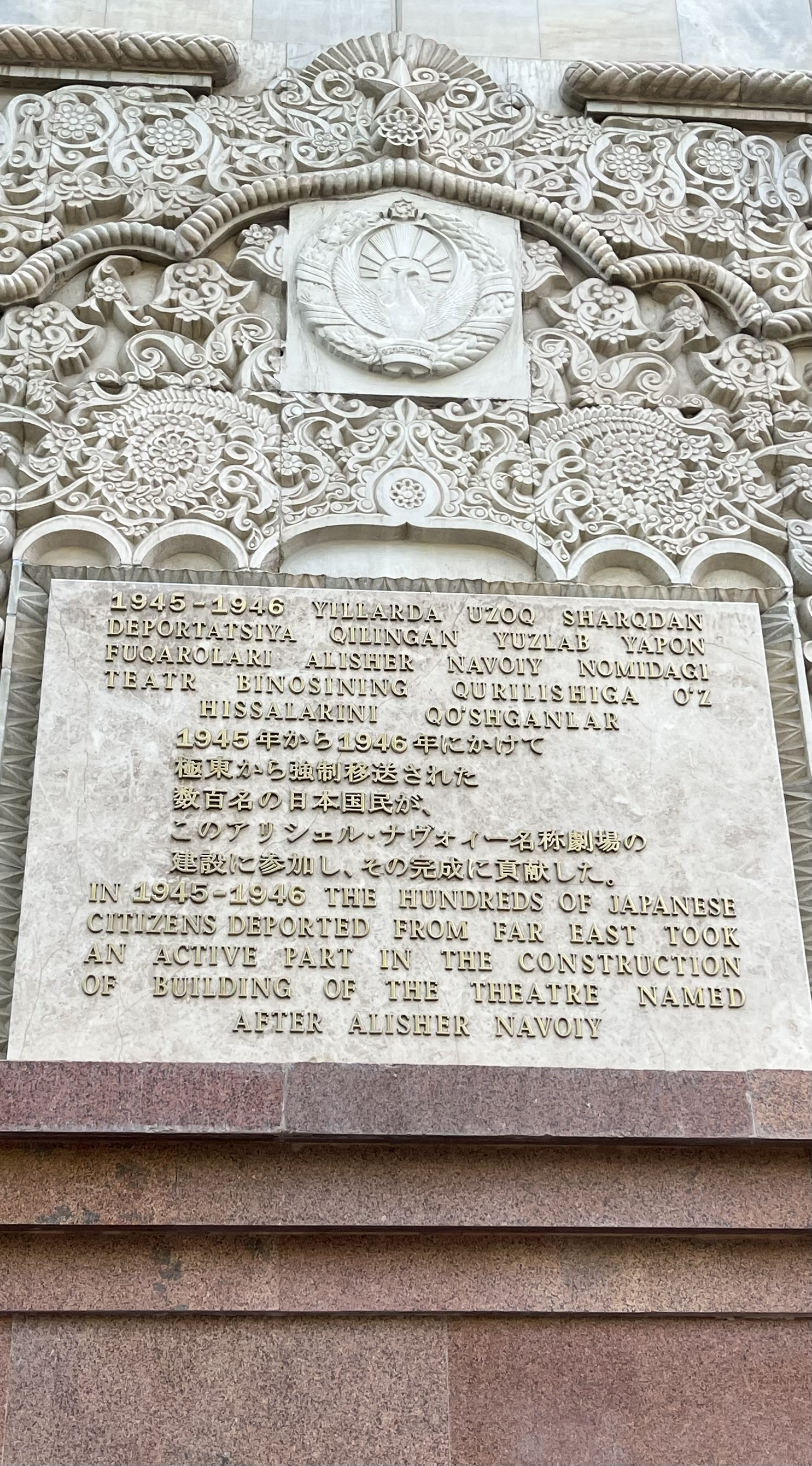
Commemorative plate acknowledging the role of Japanese prisoners of war who worked on the construction

From 1945 to 1947 Japanese prisoners of war captured by the Soviet Union participated in the building construction under forced labor.

In 1996, under then Uzbekistan President Islam Karimov a plaque was installed at the theater honoring the Japanese workers involved in its construction. The plaque reads, "In 1945–1946 the hundreds of Japanese citizens deported from the Far East took an active part in the construction of building of the Theater named after Alisher Navoiy".

== See also ==
- Ilkhom Theater
- List of Uzbek theatre groups
