= Lāčplēsis (rock opera) =

1986 rock opera by Zigmārs Liepiņš.and Māra Zālīte

The rock opera Lāčplēsis is a Latvian musical based on the Latvian national epic Lāčplēsis. The libretto was written in 1986/87 by Māra Zālīte, with music composed by Zigmārs Liepiņš. It premiered in Riga on 23 August 1988. According to Māra Zālīte's homepage there were 43 shows, each attended by 4,000 people.

== Political and cultural significance ==
Lāčplēsis was first shown at the beginning of the Third Latvian National Awakening. It has clear anti-Soviet undertones and it inspired the rising independence movements in Latvia.

== Summary ==
Unlike in the original poem, Kangars and Lāčplēsis are the best of friends. They are both heroes, they both have weaknesses, but Kangars' is easily noticeable: he is very ambitious. The rock opera mostly deals with Kangars' being blinded by the desire for fame, unaware of his betrayal until he reveals Lāčplēsis' weakness to the foreign invaders. Kangars is contrasted to Koknesis, who refuses even to think of betrayal. Laimdota and Lāčplēsis are characterised as symbols of Latvia and the Latvian people in many ways: Laimdota appears to represent Latvia herself, while Lāčplēsis stands for the people of Latvia. The villains are the crusaders, represented by their leader Dīterihs, aided by devils and informers.

== Plot ==
Lāčplēsis and Kangars are sent to study at Burtnieki. On the way they visit Aizkraukle Castle where Kangars is taken captive and tortured by devils, asking him to betray his people by drawing them into slavery and establishing Christianity. When he refuses, the torture is interrupted by the head devil Līkcepure who brainwashes him by saying that Kangars would win all fame if Lāčplēsis were not standing in his way.

Meanwhile, Lāčplēsis is dropped into the Daugava by two witches, but is saved by Staburadze, who tells him that this is his first death. He is supposed to die and come back to life three times, and go through three periods of transition from oppression to freedom. When he asks if he is dead, he is told that he is alive as long as he remembers Staburadze, sunken castles, flying lakes and who he is: he has been nursed by all Latvian mothers and his soul is made from the souls of all Latvians. Then Koknesis appears, telling Lāčplēsis to build a homeland for Latvians, and promises to supply him with wood. Afterwards, at Burtnieki, Lāčplēsis flirts with Laimdota; together they listen to songs of Burtnieki castle and Laimdota sings a prayer to Saule, the sun deity. After listening to her, Lāčplēsis tells Laimdota that through this song he hears his motherland even louder than before and raises the sunken castle of Burtnieki. The devils try to stop him, saying that his nation has no history, only old wives' tales, but he succeeds and is engaged to Laimdota, who is the very soul of Latvia.

Later Laimdota meets Kangars, who asks her to be with him. When she refuses Kangars threaten to rape her and share her with anyone who wants her. Then he kidnaps her and tells Lāčplēsis that she has fled together with "her lover" Koknesis and suggests that Lāčplēsis should leave. Broken-hearted, Lāčplēsis follows his advice. In his wanderings Lāčplēsis meets Ziemeļmeita (personification of the aurora borealis), who tells him that this is his second death: he is told that he is dead if he does not believe any more. Now Lāčplēsis wants to return to his people, but is faced with three multiheaded monsters, the jodi. When he has chopped off all but one of their heads, the last jods begs for mercy and tells him that the rocks around are actually bewitched people. Lāčplēsis awakens them and returns home.

The devils are now frightened; they curse and cry that people were already under their rule, and the local songs and language were almost exterminated. Dīterihs announces that only Kangars can help them and orders the devils to search for Kangars among the Latvian people. The devils try to convince Koknesis to join them, but he refuses, saying that Lāčplēsis is his friend and Lāčplēsis can count on him. After that, Laimdota appears and Lāčplēsis asks her why she is crying. She answers that she is dishonoured and dirty. Lāčplēcis tells her that she will become clean in his tears and they are both reborn through each other's tears; then they are married. Meanwhile, Kangars has finally discovered the weakness of Lāčplēsis and reveals it to the enemy: Lāčplēsis' power is in his ears, because he hears his motherland and feels her every movement with his ears. If they make Lāčplēsis deaf, he will be unbelieving and unremembering and therefore easy to defeat. Only then does Kangars realise what he has done and cries that he loves Latvia. The crusaders arrange a tournament for Lāčplēsis and the Black Knight, a creature that has no eyes, no ears and no language: belief and memories are drawn out of anyone who comes near him. Lāčplēsis feels doomed but still asks his motherland to call him. The narrator says that his fight with the Black Knight has not ended yet but there will come a time when Lāčplēsis will kill him.

== Song list ==
Act I

1. Prologs (Prologue)
2. Koris "Tas ir laiks" (Chorus: "It is the time")
3. Lāčplēsis "Es dzirdu" (Lāčplēsis: "I hear")
4. Lielvārdis "Uz krustcelēm" (Lielvārdis: "On the Crossroads")
5. Krustnešu koris un Dīterihs (Chorus of crusaders and Dīterihs)
6. Dīterihs un četri ziņotāji (Dīterihs and four informers)
7. Lāčplēsis un Kangars ceļā (Lāčplēsis and Kangars on the way)
8. Aizkraukles pilī (In the castle of Aizkraukle)
9. Spīdzināšana. Līkcepure un Kangars (Līkcepure and Kangars: "Torturing")
10. Pie Staburadzes (With Staburadze)
11. Koknesis "Ozols mans tēvs" (Koknesis: "The Oak is my Father")
12. Laimdotas un Lāčplēša duets (Duet of Laimdota and Lāčplēsis)
13. Burtnieku pils skanēšana (Singing of Burtnieki castle)
14. Laimdotas dziesma (Laimdota's Song)
15. Lāčplēša dziedājums "Cīņa par gaismu" (Song of Lāčplēsis: "Fight for the light")
16. Kangars un Laimdota. Laimdotas aizvešana. I cēliena fināls (Kangars and Laimdota. Abduction of Laimdota. Finale of act I)

Act II

1. Kangara melu aina (Scene of Kangar's lies)
2. Koris un Dīterihs (Chorus and Dīterihs)
3. Lāčplēsis pie Ziemeļmeitas (Lāčplēsis and Ziemeļmeita)
4. Lāčplēsis un trīs jodi (Lāčplēsis and the three jodi)
5. Lāčplēsis un koris "Atgriešanās" (Lāčplēsis and chorus: Return)
6. Dīterihs un ziņotāji "Nolādēts" (Dīterihs and informers: "Damn")
7. Līkcepure. Koknesis "Tu vari paļauties uz mani" (Līkcepure. Koknesis: "You can count on me")
8. Laimdota un Lāčplēsis "Tu raudi" (Laimdota and Lāčplēsis: "You are crying")
9. Kāzas (Weddings)
10. Lielvārdis "Latvju zeme vaļā stāv" (Lielvārds: "The Latvian lands stand opened")
11. Lāčplēsis "Es dzirdu" (Lāčplēsis: "I hear")
12. Nodevības aina. Dīterihs, ziņotāji un Kangars (Scene of betrayal. Dīterihs, informers and Kangars)
13. Teicējs un koris (Narrator and chorus)
14. Lāčplēsis "Kas tu esi?" (Lāčplēsis: "Who are you?")
15. Koris "Tas ir laiks" (Chorus: "It is the time")
16. Epilogs (Epilogue)

== Cast ==
- Lāčplēsis – Igo
- Laimdota – Maija Lūsēna
- Kangars – Imants Vanzovičs
- Lielvārdis – Juris Rijkuris
- Ziemeļmeita – Žaneta Ondzule
- Koknesis – Aivars Brīze
- Dīterihs – Niks Matvejevs
- Līkcepure – Zigfrīds Muktupāvels and Viesturs Jansons
- Staburadze – Mirdza Zīvere and Daiga Blaua
- Narrator – Jānis Skanis
- Girls– Ramona Fogele, Dita Podskočija, Aija Siliņa, Dana Purgaile, Lolita Sauliete
- Ziņotāji (informers), jodi, velni (devils) –Ainars Ašmanis, Aigars Grauba, Aigars Krēsla, Aigars Grāvers

== Instrumentalists ==
- Zigmars Liepiņš, Uldis Marhilevičs – keyboards
- Harijs Zariņš, Aivars Hermanis – guitar
- Guntis Vecgailis, Eduards Glotovs – bass guitar
- Oļegs Upenieks, Vilnis Krieviņš – percussion
- Recordings of the folklore music bands "Skandinieki" and "Iļģi" were also used.

== Sources ==
- https://web.archive.org/web/20070928004720/http://www.marazalite.lv/html/dramatugija/25581.php
- Recording of "Lāčplēsis" (Latvijas Televīzija 1988)

Guntis Smidchens, "National Heroic Narratives in the Baltics as a Source for Nonviolent Political Action," Slavic Review 66,3 (2007), 484–508.
