= Is It Easy to Be Young? =

1987 film by Juris Podnieks]

- Latvian poster
- Directed by: Juris Podnieks
- Written by: Ābrams Kleckins; Jevgēnijs Margolins; Juris Podnieks
- Cinematography: Kalvis Zalcmanis
- Edited by: Antra Cilinska
- Music by: Mārtiņš Brauns
- Distributed by: Riga Film Studio; Jura Podnieka Studija (DVD release, 2007)
- Release date: June 1987 (Kraków Film Festival)
- Running time: 80 minutes
- Country: Soviet Union
- Languages: Latvian; Russian

Is It Easy to Be Young? (Latvian: Vai viegli būt jaunam?, Russian: Легко ли быть молодым?, romanized: Legko li byt molodym?) is a Soviet-era Latvian documentary film directed by Juris Podnieks. It was filmed in 1986 with dialogue in both Latvian and Russian, and is considered to be among the most controversial movies of its era. It was one of the five winners of the 1987 International Documentary Association awards.

The movie speaks about young people who perished as a result of growing up in Soviet society—their conflicts with parents and society, the patronizing attitudes of their teachers and the authorities, the fear that there is no meaning to their lives. Among the young people portrayed are high-schoolers looking for their place in life, a young mother worried about the future of her daughter after the Chernobyl catastrophe, a young man follower of the Hare Krishna movement (an 'unusual' religion that was discouraged even more than 'usual' ones by the Soviet government), as well young adults returning from compulsory military service in the Soviet–Afghan War and having become ones of 'the lost generation'. The film's opening scene documents a concert by the banned Latvian rock band, Pērkons.

The movie had a major impact in the Soviet Union. It was seen by at least 28 million people during its first year. In all, 85 countries bought the rights to show the movie.

In 1986 the film received Latvian Film Prize for the best documentary. Its international debut was at the 1987 Kraków Film Festival, where it received the FIPRESCI Award. It was also screened out of competition at the 1987 Cannes Film Festival.

The film was re-released in 2007 by Jura Podnieka Studija; the new edition includes oral history interviews with Podnieks's colleagues.

After Latvia regained independence, Antra Cilinska filmed two sequels (Is It Easy to Be? in 1998, and Is it Easy? in 2010), featuring interviews with people filmed by Podnieks.
