= Lauri Nebel =

Estonian actor, singer and magician (born 1948)

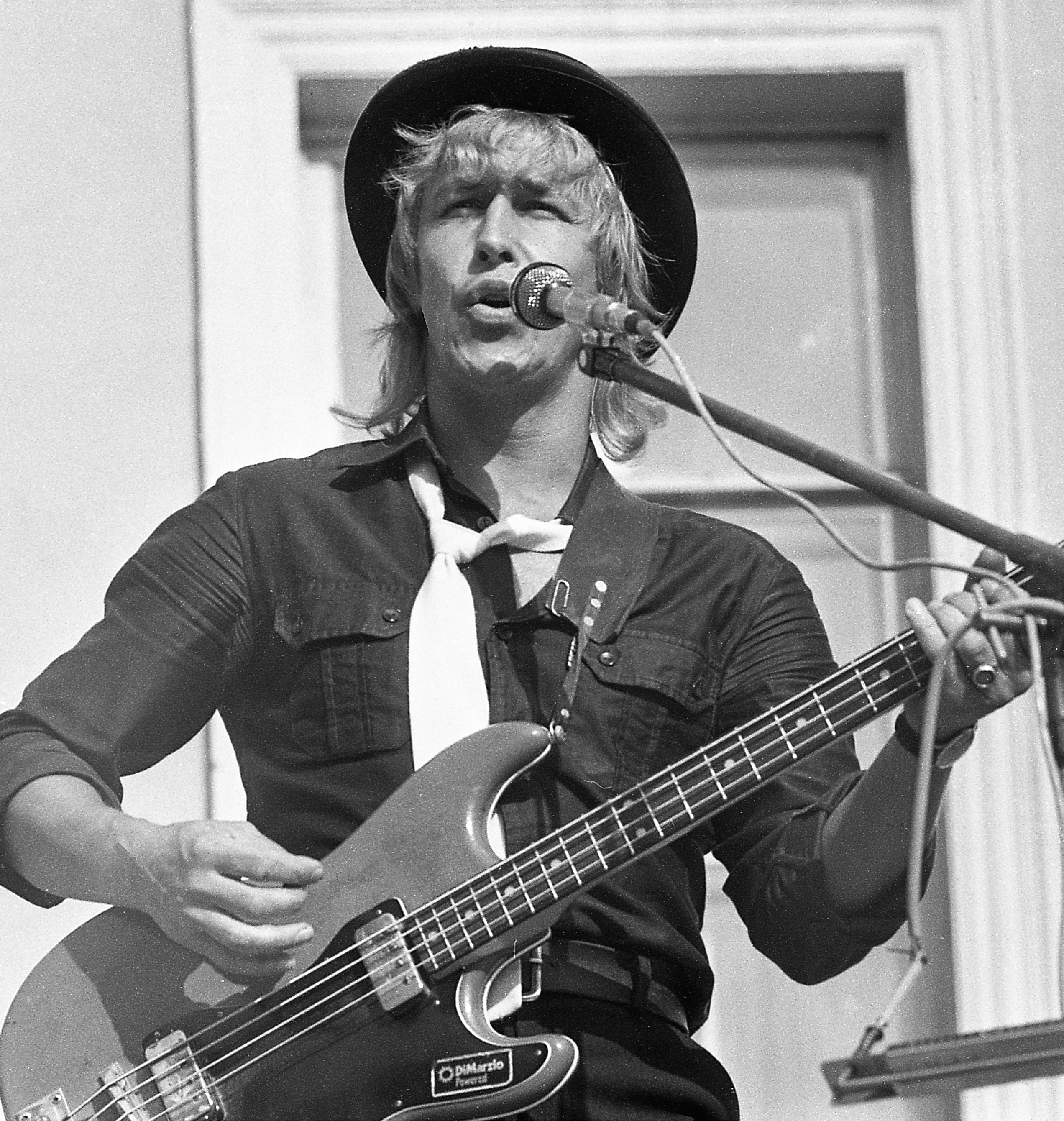
Lauri Nebel, 1984

Lauri Nebel (born 11 October 1948) is an Estonian actor, singer and magician.

== Filmography ==
Nebel has played Jakob in Metskapten (1971), Timmu the seaman in Siin me oleme (1979), Lenin No. 4 in All My Lenins (1997) and Peeter in Head käed (2001).
