= Mark Weil =

Uzbekistani theatre director

- Born: Марк Яковлевич Вайль; January 25, 1952; Tashkent, USSR
- Died: September 7, 2007 (aged 55); Tashkent, Uzbekistan
- Cause of death: Murdered
- Occupation: Theatre director
- Known for: Founder of Ilkhom Theatre

Mark Yakovlevich Weil (Russian: Марк Яковлевич Вайль; 25 January 1952 – 7 September 2007) was a Soviet and Uzbekistani theatre director, and founder and art director of the Ilkhom Theatre in Tashkent. His parents, Ukrainian Jews, had arrived in Uzbekistan in the late 1930s. His father was a soldier, and his mother had studied at the Theatre Institute, Kiev.

His last production was the Greek tragedy The Oresteia; he was murdered the day before it was scheduled to open, and the actors went ahead because the show must go on. He was stabbed to death in the entrance lobby to his block of flats in Tashkent. He was reportedly attacked by two unknown males, who hit him on the head with a bottle and stabbed him in the abdomen. The murderers escaped after the attack.

His murder was the subject of a BBC Radio 4 Crossing Continents documentary in April 2008.

İn 2010, three men were convicted of murdering Weil. They said they had killed him in response to his portrayal of Muhammad in his play Imitating the Koran.
