= Modris (film) =

2014 Latvian film by Juris Kursietis

- Film poster
- Directed by: Juris Kursietis
- Written by: Juris Kursietis
- Starring: Kristers Pikša
- Release dates: 9 September 2014 (TIFF); 24 October 2014 (Latvia)
- Running time: 98 minutes
- Country: Latvia
- Languages: Latvian; Russian

Modris is a 2014 Latvian drama film written and directed by Juris Kursietis. It was screened in the Contemporary World Cinema section at the 2014 Toronto International Film Festival. The film was selected as the Latvian entry for the Best Foreign Language Film at the 88th Academy Awards but it was not nominated.

== Plot ==
Modris is an average school student, who lives with his single-parent mother, with whom his relations are strained. Everything comes to a boiling point after Modris pawns his mother's electric heater to earn money for playing slots machines. To teach him a lesson, Modris' mother reports him to the police and Modris is sentenced to a two year suspended sentence, much to the shock of the mother. Modris then has to deal with both the legal system and his sudden desire to find his unknown father.

== Cast ==
- Rēzija Kalniņa as Mother
- Kristers Pikša as Modris

== See also ==
- List of submissions to the 88th Academy Awards for Best Foreign Language Film
- List of Latvian submissions for the Academy Award for Best Foreign Language Film
