= Perfect Solution =

2001 album by The Hobos

Studio album by The Hobos
- Released: June 2001
- Genre: Rock
- Label: Platforma Records

The Hobos chronology
Numbvision (1999)	Perfect Solution (2001)	Flashback Mornings (2002)

Perfect Solution is a 2001 studio album by The Hobos. It was the follow-up to their successful debut Numbvision. Like its predecessor, Perfect Solution gained praise both from the public and the critics. It also won the "Latvian Rock Album of the Year" award in 2001.

Perfect Solution marks the first time a Latvian band released a CD with expanded media features, in this case a music video of their first album hit "Christian (I’m Gonna Be)". The album is also notable for being recorded at the Abbey Road Studios.

"Midnight Lovers", "Take-off" and "Can You Love" were released as radio singles.

== Track listing ==
All songs by Rolands Ūdris.

1. "Midnight Lovers" – 3:19
2. "Yours Beautiful" – 3:17
3. "Heaven on Green" – 5:24
4. "Sunrise" – 3:20
5. "Angel Joo" – 4:32
6. "Speed" – 4:40
7. "Womy Not" – 2:09
8. "Domestic Animals" – 4:41
9. "Take-off" – 2:57
10. "Can You Love" – 2:28
11. "Outhouse" – 3:23
12. "Perfect Solution" – 3:09
