= Helga Dancberga =

Soviet Latvian actor (1941–2019)

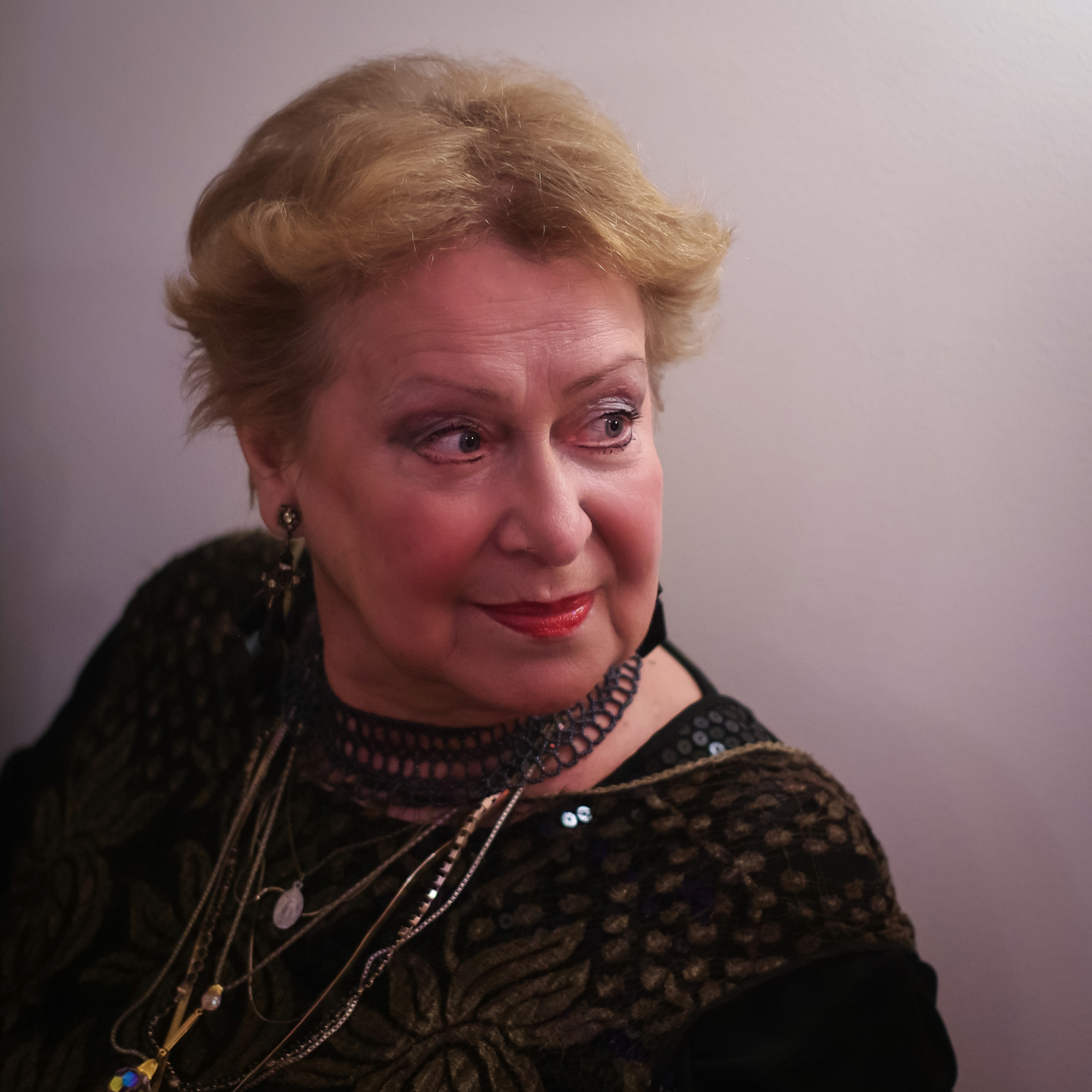
- Born: November 18, 1941; Riga
- Died: November 17, 2019 (aged 77)
- Occupations: actor, Arts director
- Employer: Jāzeps Vītols Latvian Academy of Music
- Spouse: Imants Kalniņš
- Children: 3

Helga Dancberga (18 November 1941 – 17 November 2019) was a Soviet then Latvian actor. She was the director of the Department of Culture and Arts at the Latvian Conservatoire.

== Life ==
Dancberga was born in Riga in 1941. She trained at Jāzeps Vītols Latvian Academy of Music.

In 1962 she graduated from the Daile Theater 3rd studio in 1962 and went on to work at both the theater in Valmiera and the one in Liepaja.

In 1967 she was in Jazz and the Devil where she sang "Beth Song", which was written by her husband.

Dancberg has also been a film actress, starring in Rolands Kalniņš's 1972 film Ceplis. She played the wife of the main character. It was said to be one of Latvia's most popular from that film industry's "golden age". Dancberg was admitted to the Latvian Theater Gold Foundation.

She worked at the Latvian National Theater from 1975 playing subtle witty roles.

In 1984 she led the Department of Culture and Arts at the Latvian Conservatoire aka Jāzeps Vītols Latvian Academy of Music.

== Works include ==
- Josh Gross's Jazz and the Devil
- The Clock with the Cuckoo, a play by John Jurkan
- Harry Swan's plays Oliver and Albert
- Auriiki Cinderella in The Dull Baron Bunduli
- Bebeni in Skroder's Day in Silmaci
- Ms. Ceplis in the film Ceplis

== Death ==
She died on 17 November 2019.

== Private life ==
She was married to the composer Imants Kalniņš. They had three children: Dana Kalniņa-Zaķe, who became the lead for the Latvian Association of Professional Health Care Chaplains, actress Rēzija Kalniņa and Krists Kalniņš, who is a pastor. She brought up the children alone.
