= Numbvision =

1999 album by The Hobos

Studio album by The Hobos
- Released: May 1999
- Genre: Rock
- Label: Platforma Records

The Hobos chronology
Numbvision (1999)	Perfect Solution (2001)

Numbvision is the 1999 debut of Latvian rock band The Hobos. Upon its release the album gained positive reviews, and was even called "the best thing to come out of Latvian music scene in the last decade". Praised for great production values and strong songwriting, the album’s signature song "Christian (I’m Gonna Be)" became an instant radio staple for the year to come. Numbvision was also awarded the "Best Pop/Rock Album 1999".

A video was filmed for "Christian (I’m Gonna Be)" and later released as a special feature on the band’s next album, Perfect Solution.

== Track listing ==
All songs by Rolands Ūdris.

1. "She Sounds Like a Little Child" – 3:35
2. "Feeling Like a Hobo" – 4:30
3. "Christian (I’m Gonna Be)" – 2:45
4. "A Frick’n Xmas Song" – 2:24
5. "Born To Be Drunk" – 4:32
6. "She Was My Girl" – 4:25
7. "Reminiscence of a Funny Face" – 3:07
8. "Another Vision of a Funny Face" – 1:34
9. "Lululu" – 3:39
10. "Numbvision" – 4:20
11. "Into the Sound" – 4:11
12. "Surrender" – 6:06
