= Radio Jah Jah =

2004 album by The Hobos

Studio album by The Hobos
- Released: 25 May 2004
- Genre: Rock
- Label: Platforma Records

The Hobos chronology
Flashback Mornings (2002)	Radio Jah Jah (2004)	TBA (2007)

Radio Jah Jah is a 2004 studio album by The Hobos. It was the follow-up to their previous studio album Flashback Mornings. Radio Jah Jah is a special release for the band in that it is a double album with one CD featuring original material written by the band's spiritual leader Rolands Ūdris, and the other disc compiled from various covers done by the band.

When asked to comment on the title of the album, singer Rolands Ūdris replied: "Radio Jah Jah is the radio that plays in our heads. And because of that we decided to pay homage to some of our favourite musicians."

At the time of release the band was praised for many original ideas in covering of these songs. For example, Modern Talking's disco hit "You're My Heart, You're My Soul" was done in a style resembling samba. The follow-up to Radio Jah Jah is due out in 2007.

== Track listing ==
All songs written by Rolands Ūdris, except where noted.

=== Disc one ===
1. "Don’t Forget" – 3:29
2. "Disaster" – 3:48
3. "Bird" – 3:21
4. "King" – 2:59
5. "Why" – 3:20
6. "Big Bang" – 3:22
7. "Take Your Lover" – 4:35
8. "Sorry" – 2:38
9. "Lullaby" – 3:57
10. "Stardust" – 3:57

=== Disc two ===
1. "Hero" (Iglesias, Barry, Taylor) – 3:51
2. "Cocaine" (Cale) – 3:23
3. "Red Red Wine" (Diamond) – 2:37
4. "You’re My Heart, You’re My Soul" (Bohlen) – 3:33
5. "My My, Hey Hey" (Young) – 3:27
6. "I Shot the Sheriff" (Marley) – 3:32
7. "These Boots Are Made for Walkin'" (Hazlewood) – 2:43
8. "Don't Worry, Be Happy" (McFerrin) – 3:14
9. "Cecilia" (Simon) – 3:45
10. "Rain" (Lennon, McCartney) – 2:46
11. "Radio Jah Jah" – 3:38
12. "I've Just Seen a Face" (Lennon, McCartney) – 2:28
