= Karogs =

Latvian literary magazine (1940–2010)

- Categories: Literary magazine
- Frequency: Monthly
- Publisher: Soviet Latvian Writers’ Union
- Founded: 1940
- First issue: September 1940
- Final issue: 2010
- Country: Latvia
- Based in: Riga
- Language: Latvian

Karogs ('Flag') was a monthly literary magazine which was published in Latvia in the period between 1940 and 2010. Published by the Soviet Latvian Writers’ Union during the Communist period it was a semi-official publication.

== History and profile ==
Karogs was launched as a monthly publication in 1940 just after the occupation of Latvia by the Soviet Union. The first issue appeared in September 1940. Its publisher was the Soviet Latvian Writers’ Union. The magazine not only featured articles on literature, but also on art, and socio-politics. However, during the first five years it focused only on literature and was the sole literary publication in Soviet Latvia. From its start in 1940 to the late 1980s it was the supporter of the Communist regime featuring the Soviet literary work. The magazine strictly followed the slogan of the Communist Party: "Art has only one goal: the building of Communism."

The first discussions on the Buddhist religious and philosophical ideas in Latvia were featured in Karogs in 1971. It was also the first Latvian literary magazine which published the work by Latvian writer Ādolfs Erss in 1986. Karogs folded in 2010.

== Editors and contributors ==
The founding editor-in-chief of Karogs was Andrejs Upīts, and full list of its editors-in-chief is as follows:

- Andrejs Upīts (1940–1941; 1945–1946)
- Ignats Muižnieks (1946–1948)
- Andrejs Balodis (1948–1963)
- Kārlis Krauliņš (1964–1967)
- Andris Vējāns (1967–1989)
- Māra Zālīte, Māris Čaklais, Ieva Kolmane (1989–2010)

Under the editorship of Andrejs Upīts the editorial board members included Vilis Lācis, Jūlijs Lācis, Arvīds Grigulis, Jānis Niedre, and Žanis Spure were the major contributors of Karogs.

In the 1960s Gunars Freimanis published several poems on environmental issues in the magazine. In its fiftieth anniversary issue dated September 1990 the magazine featured work by Rimants Ziedonis, Guntis Berelis, and Inguna Bekere and also, work by three American and one Russian writers.

== Legacy ==
The State Archive of Latvia archived the issues of Karogs.
