= List of Uzbek theatre groups =

Uzbek Theatre Groups refer to established and new theatre companies in Uzbekistan, as well as those specializing in Uzbek and Central Asian theatre overseas. Over the years, Uzbek theatre has often been at the centre of both religious and political tussles.

All early theatre in Uzbekistan was in both the Russian and Uzbek languages. Uzbek theatre tradition is usually traced to Khamza, one of the first Uzbek playwrights - even though the country has a strong poetry and musical tradition, theatre was not really established until the early 20th century. Khamza was killed by fundamentalists in 1929, primarily for promoting women's rights. In the 1930s, the Bolsheviks used theatre as an effective means of propaganda.

Theatre Groups in Uzbekistan

- Ilkhom Theatre Company (Tashkent)
- Youth Theatre of Uzbekistan (Tashkent)
- Muqimi Uzbek State Music Theatre (Tashkent)
- Khamza Drama Theatre Company (Tashkent)
- Bukhara Puppetry Theatre (Bukhara)
- Uzbek Milliy Akademik Drama Theatre (Tashkent)

Theatre Groups outside Uzbekistan

- Orzu Arts Theatre Company (London - United Kingdom)
