= Māra Zālīte =

Latvian writer (born 1952)

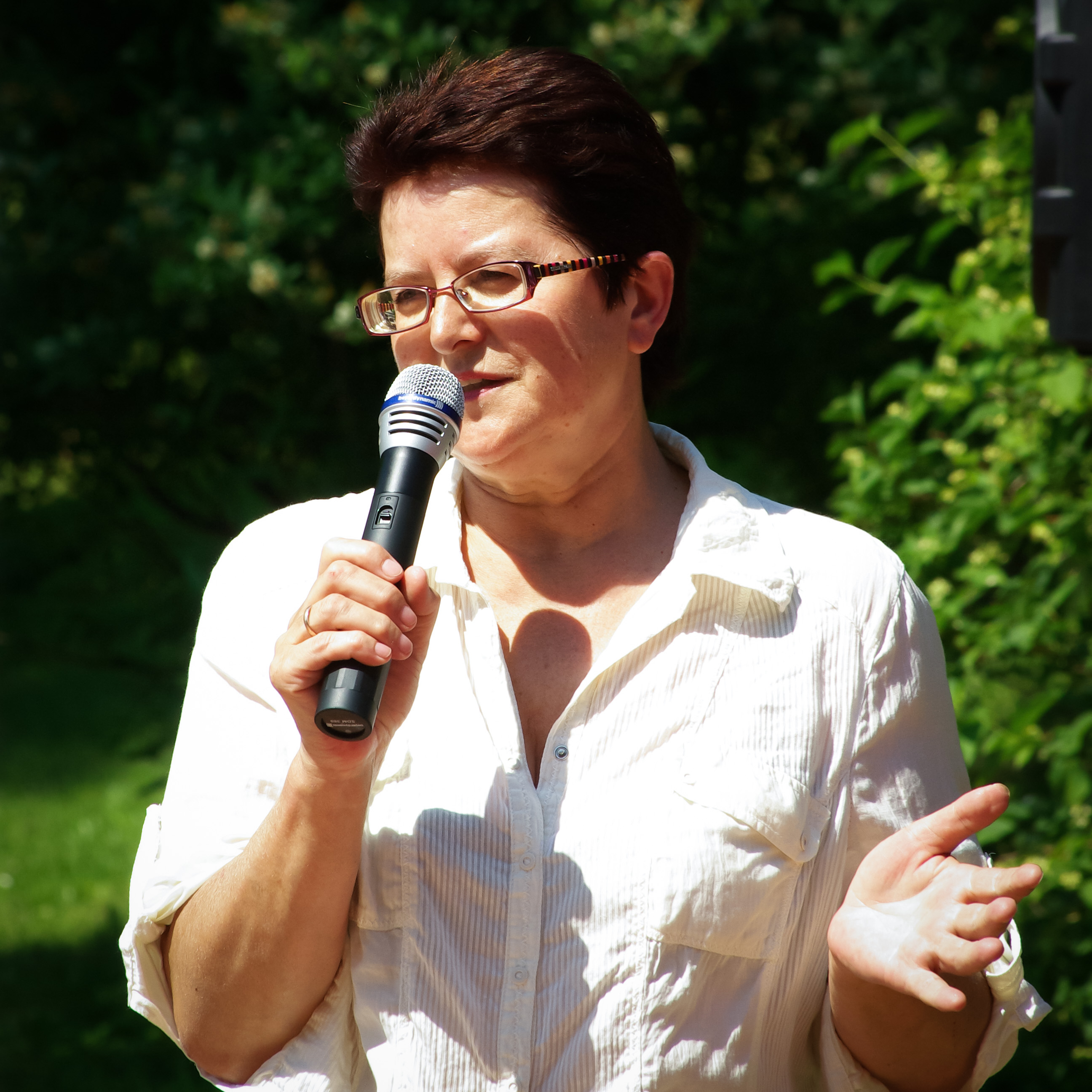
- Born: February 18, 1952 (age 74); Krasnoyarsk, Soviet Union (now Russia)
- Education: University of Latvia
- Known for: Literature
- Spouse: Jānis Ķuzulis (m. 1979)
- Awards: Order of Three Stars

Māra Zālīte (born 18 February 1952 in Krasnoyarsk) is a Siberian-born Latvian writer and cultural worker.

== Biography ==
Zālīte's literary works include poetry, essays, plays, drama, prose and librettos. They often deal with historical problems and have symbolic meanings that correspond with mythology and Latvian culture and people. The author's works have been translated into many languages including Russian, English, German, Swedish, Estonian, and French.

Her first literary works were published in the early 1970s. During the 1980s, Zālīte turned to playwriting, composing librettos for musicals and writing rock operas. Her works have used music by many eminent Latvian artists such as Raimonds Pauls and Jānis Lūsēns.

She has earned many literary prizes and national awards, including the Order of the Three Stars, and is considered one of the greatest Latvian social figures.

Her first prose work – the autobiographical novel “Five fingers” (2013), earned wide recognition from both readers and members of the writing community.

== Early life ==
Zālīte was born in 1952., in Krasnoyarsk, Siberia, to where her family had been deported in 1941.

She spent 4 1/2 years of her childhood in Krasnoyarsk, Siberia until the autumn of 1956 when her parents got the permission to return to their homeland of Latvia. She spent the rest of her childhood in Slampes Kalna Ķivuļi. Zālīte studied elementary and secondary school at Slampes' primary school.

== Career ==
Zālīte is a graduate from Murjāņi sports boarding school (1970) and the Faculty of Philology of the University of Latvia (1975) (a former State University). Between years 1974 and 1989, Zālīte worked as a technical assistant at the Writers’ Union of Latvia, as a manager of the New Writers’ Studio and as a poetry consultant for the magazine “Liesma”. In 1989, she became chief editor of the publishing house and magazine Karogs, a position she held until 2000, when she became president of the Latvian Authors’ Association (AKKA/LAA) (2000–2008). She has also been a member of the City Council of the Order of the Three Stars (1999–2006), chairman of a State Language Commission (2002–2004) as well as a member of Chapter of Orders (2006–2007).

She is also a trust member of the National Library Board (since 1998), an honorary member of the Academy of Sciences and one of the 14 founders of “Koknese foundation” (since 2005).

Zālīte has been awarded the Three Star Order, Commemorative Medal of Barricades and has received several literary prizes.

== Family ==
Zālīte has been married to Jānis Ķuzulis since 1979, with whom she has two children – Jānis Ķuzulis and Ilze Ķuzule-Skrastiņa as well as three grandchildren – Krišjānis, Emīlija and Marats. She currently lives in Riga and often stays at her countryside house in Tukums.

== Major awards ==
Vladimir Mayakovsky Award (1982, Georgia)

Ojārs Vācietis prize (1989)

Aspazija Award (1992)

The Herder Prize (1993, Germany)

The Commemorative Medal for Participants of the Barricades of 1991 (Barikāžu piemiņas medaļa) (2000) for significant involvement in the Barricades of 1991.

Order of the Three Stars (Trīs zvaigžņu ordenis) (08.11.1995.) for involvement in the Barricades.

Cross of Recognition (Atzinības krusts) (12.11.2008) for outstanding merits in social and cultural work, a brilliant creative contribution in Latvian literature and the strengthening of the Latvian language.

The International Baltic Sea Region Jānis Baltvilks Prize in Children's Literature and Book Art prize (2012) for the children tale "Tango un Tūtiņa ciemos" (Tango and Tutina on a visit).

The Annual Latvian Literary Award (2001; 2004; 2014) for collection of plays "Sauciet to par teātri"; play "Zemes nodoklis" and autobiographical novel "Pieci pirksti" (Five fingers).

== Style and genre ==
At the start of Zālīte's career, during the time of her first significant publication of the poem “Balādīte” in the magazine Karogs in 1972; the main ideas in her poetry were about life and youth in the 1970s — looking for the meaning of life, development of personality, values, and overcoming the problems of life.

Alongside poetry, Zālīte has written drama. In the 1980s, the writer focused more on philosophical and emotional motifs combining history and modern times as well as referencing ongoing social and political issues, often associated with Latvian culture and mythology. The tragic Latvian fate and the nation's longing for freedom is best depicted in the poetry collection “Debesis, debesis” (1988).

Initially, her playwriting developed as a continuation of her poetry. She has written a handful of plays and librettos combining strong individual characters with topics of history, myths and national identity, her most popular one being the libretto for the mythic-symbolic rock opera “The Bearslayer” ("Lāčplēsis") (1987), which became a symbol of the Third Latvian awakening.

At the end of the 20th century, Zālīte's 6th poetry collection “Apkārtne” (1997) pictured a person aware of his surroundings and the problems he faces – freedom, chaos, hope, loss and depression.

In all of the author's literary career, her works have been strongly influenced by her childhood, which is best depicted in her first prose works – the autobiographical novels “Five fingers” (2013) and “Paradīzes putni”(2018) that talk about occupation and a childhood spent in the Soviet Union's regime. Readers describe these works as poetic, nostalgic and passionate.

Māra Zālīte has also released some literary works for children.

== Published works ==
=== Poetry collections ===
- Vakar zaļajā zālē (All Birds Know This). Riga, Liesma, 1977
- Rīt varbūt (Perhaps Tomorrow). Riga, Liesma, 1979
- Nav vārdam vietas (No Place for Words). Riga, Liesma, 1985
- Debesis, debesis (Heaven, Heaven). Riga, Liesma, 1988
- Apkārtne (The World Around Me). Riga, Preses nams, 1997
- Dzeja (Poetry). Rīga, Atēna, 2003
- Dziesmu rakstā. Riga, Mansards, 2015

=== Essay collections ===
- Brīvības tēla pakājē (At the Foot of the Statue of Freedom). Australia, Australian Latvian Writers' Days and the Latvian Press Association's Australian Branch, 1990
- Kas ticībā sēts (Sowed in Faith). Riga, Rīga, 1997

=== Novels ===
- Pieci pirksti (Five fingers). Rīga, Mansards, 2013.
- Paradīzes putni (Birds of Paradise). Rīga, Dienas grāmata, 2018.

=== Plays ===
- Pilna Māras istabiņa. Youth Theatre, Riga, 1983
- Tiesa (Trial), written 1982. Dailes Theatre, Riga, 1985
- Dzīvais ūdens (Living Water). Youth Theatre, Riga, 1988
- Eža kažociņš (The Hedgehog’s Prickly Coat). The Theatre of Valmiera, 1993
- Margarēta (Margaret). The New Theatre of Riga, 2001
- Tobāgo! (Tobago!). Dailes Theatre, Riga, 2001
- Zemes nodoklis (All Cats are Human), Dailes Theatre, Riga, 2003
- Še Tev žūpu Bērtulis (Surely not Tippler Bertulis). Ogre stage, Ogre, 2004
- Pērs Gints nav mājās. Dailes Theatre, Riga, 2007
- Lācis. Dailes Theatre, Riga, 2009
- Priekules Ikars. Dailes Theatre, Riga, 2009

=== Librettos ===
- Lāčplēsis (The Bearslayer), 1986/1987
- Meža gulbji (The Wild Swans), 1995
- Putnu opera (Bird’s Opera), 1997
- Kaupēn, mans mīļais! (Kaupen, my dear), 1998
- Indriķa hronika (The Chronicle of Henricus), 1999
- Neglītais pīlēns (The Ugly Duckling), 2000
- Sfinksa, 2000
- Hotel Kristina, 2006
- Leļļu opera, 2008
- Meierovics, 2013

=== Books for children ===
- Deviņpuiku spēks (Boys to the 9th power). Riga, Liesma, 1985
- Mamma un tētis kūrortā (Mama and Papa at a resort). Riga, Dienas Grāmata, 2016
- Tango un Tūtiņa ciemos (Tango and Tutina on a visit). Riga, Liels un mazs, 2017

=== Other works ===
- To mēs nezinām. Sarunas ar Imantu Ziedoni. Riga, Dienas grāmata, 2009
