= Pērkons (band) =

Latvian rock band

- Origin: Riga, Latvia
- Genres: Rock
- Years active: 1981–present
- Members: Ieva Akurātere; Juris Sējāns; Leons Sējāns; Raimonds Bartaševičs
- Past members: Juris Kulakovs (1981–2024); Nauris Puntulis (1982–1992); Dainis Strazdiņš (1981–1988); Māris Students (1981–1991); Ikars Ruņģis (1988–1992)

Pērkons (Latvian: thunder) is a Latvian rock band formed in 1981. The band consisted of Juris Kulakovs (keyboard, compositions), Juris Sējāns (bass, vocals), Leons Sējāns (lead guitar), Ieva Akurātere (vocals), Raimonds Bartaševics (vocals), and Ikars Ruņģis (drums).

Pērkons often played both instrumental classical music and rock'n'roll or hard rock; but, they were better known for playing the latter. In 1983, the band was banned by the Soviet government. However, they renamed and continued to play as the Ensemble of the Soviet Latvia Collective Farm. In 1985, after a concert in Ogre, a group of teenagers demolished two train compartments, resulting in the group being banned again, despite the band not being involved. The incident was documented by Juris Podnieks in the film Is It Easy to Be Young?

In 1987, they played at the music festival Liepājas dzintars (English: Amber of Liepāja) as the official band of a rural fishermen's kolkhoz.

The lyrics of their music were mostly written by Māris Melgalvs, and were seen as rebellious, especially for the time. One of their best-known songs is Balāde par gulbi. The group has also performed Songs of Fredman by the Swedish 18th century song-poet Carl Michael Bellman.

Kulakovs died in 2024, which Juris Sējāns confirmed on February 12th.
