= Juris Podnieks =

Latvian film director

Juris Podnieks (December 5, 1950, Riga – June 23, 1992, Kuldīga district) was a Soviet/Latvian film director and producer.

== Early life and education ==
Podnieks was born in the family of an announcer and a dental technician. He started his career in film in 1967, becoming an assistant cameraman. He graduated from the Soviet VGIK film school in 1975 after which he started working at the Riga Film Studio. He became a director in 1979.

== Career ==
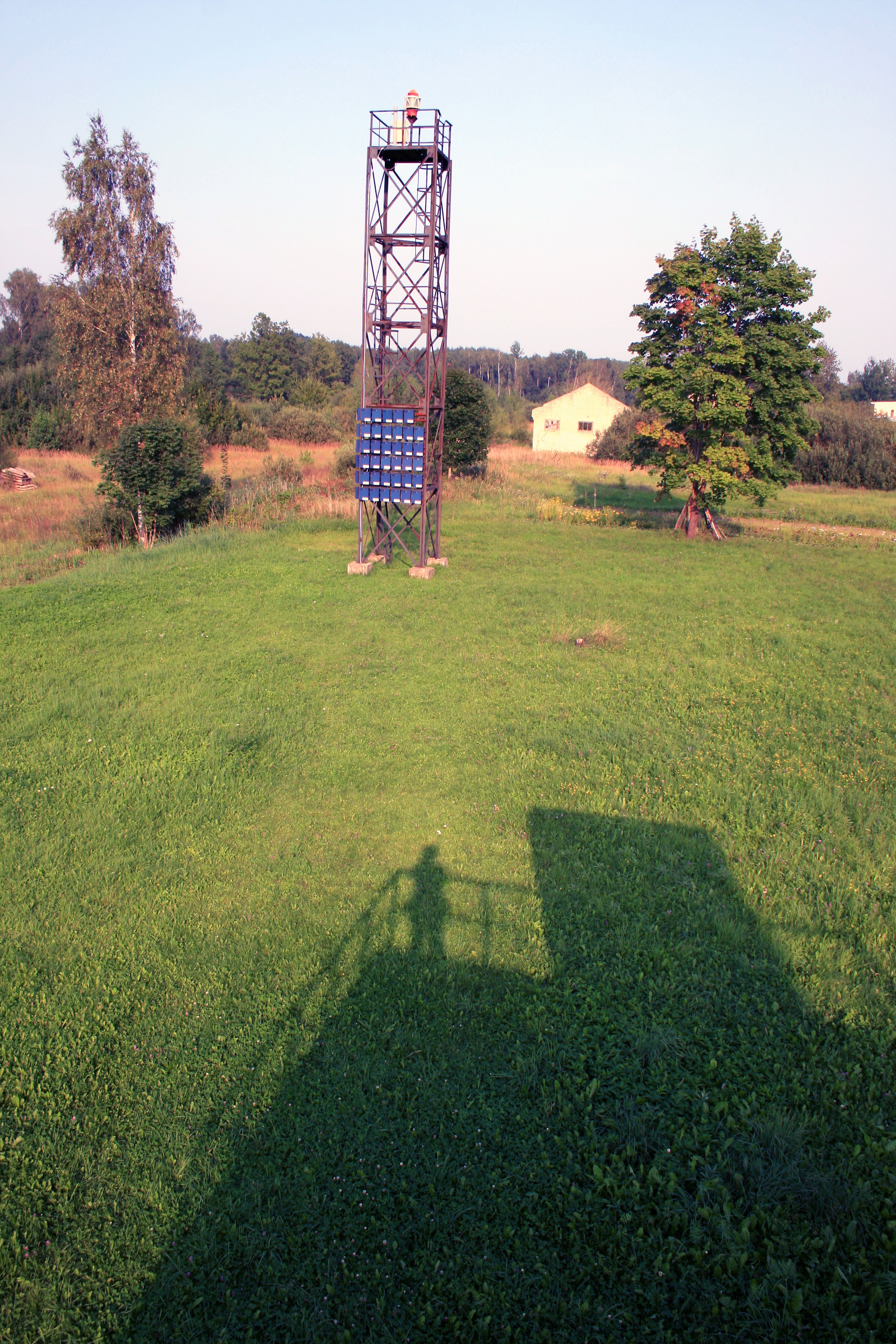
A light tower dedicated to Podnieks in Ķeipene, Latvia

Podnieks' first film Cradle won an award at the Dok Leipzig festival. In 1981, his film The Brothers Kokari (Brāļi Kokari, which followed Latvian composers-twins Imants and Gido Kokars) took the first prize at the Kiev Youth Festival. In the same year, his film Constellation of Riflemen (Strēlnieku zvaigznājs) won honours in the 17th All State Festival in Leningrad and the Latvian Komsomol prize. This film gave Podnieks wide recognition within the Soviet Union.

Podnieks gained international recognition with his movie 'Is It Easy to Be Young?. The film with dialogue in both Latvian and Russian was an exploration of Soviet youth, in which Podnieks talked to Latvian youngsters, many of which were seen as outliers and/or rebels at the time. The movie broke box-office records in the Soviet Union - something that rarely happened to documentaries.

As the Soviet Union collapsed, Podnieks cooperated with British television to give a first-hand insight on the events in the Soviet Union. Over three years, Podnieks filmed a five-part documentary titled Soviets or Hello, do you hear us? (title in the UK, Mēs? in Latvian). It showed civil unrest in Uzbekistan, survivors of the 1988 Spitak earthquake in Armenia, striking workers in Yaroslavl, environmental protests in Kirishi, former residents returning to Chernobyl etc. The first film in the series, Red Hot, was awarded the Prix Italia and the Peabody Award.

Later, Podnieks filmed movies that focused on the rise of national identity in Latvia, Lithuania and Estonia. His Homeland (Krustceļš, 1992) was an account of folk festivals in these countries when national songs which had been banned by the Soviet regime for 50 years, were sung by massed choirs. While filming a follow-up in January 1991, Podnieks and his crew came under sniper fire during the attempted coup by Soviet forces in Riga. Podnieks was beaten up, his cameraman and long-time friend Andris Slapiņš was killed and Gvido Zvaigzne, another collaborator and friend of Podnieks, died of injuries. This was captured on video and shown as an addition to Homeland and later as an introduction for the revised version of this film.

Four of his films received the Lielais Kristaps prize as the best documentary of the year.

Juris Podnieks drowned on 23 June 1992 (during Jāņi) while scuba-diving in Zvirgzdu Lake near Alsunga in Courland. Various conspiracy theories have been put forward ever since about the circumstances of his death.

== Legacy ==
In 2010, Podnieks was posthumously awarded the Latvian Order of Viesturs, 1st Class for his contribution to the restoration of the independence of Latvia. The award was given to his relatives in a ceremony by Latvian president Valdis Zatlers. He had also received the Soviet medal "For Distinguished Labour" and the USSR State Prize.
