= Rēzija Kalniņa =

Latvian actress (born 1970)

- Born: Rēzija Kalniņa; 23 December 1970 (age 54); Rīga, Latvian SSR
- Occupation: Actress

Rēzija Kalniņa (born 23 December 1970) is a Latvian actress. In the theater, since 1994, she has worked for Dailes Theatre. She has also taken part in several films. Her parents are the Latvian composer Imants Kalniņš and the actor and director Helga Dancberga.

In 2001, she received the Lielais Kristaps award for her role in Good Hands.

== Filmography ==
Year	Film	Role	Release date (flag: country specific)	Notes
1991	Brīvība	Simmona	1991	
1992	Sievietes	Inga	1992	
2001	Good Hands	Margita	6 April 2001	
2003	Negribu, negribu, negribu!...		2003	
2004	Navazhdenie	Wanda	2004	TV mini-series
2005	Archangel	Valehska	19 March 2005	
2005	Kõrini!	Sabrina	10 December 2005	
2005	Maximum Headroom	Anna	2005	
2006	Polizeiruf 110	Laima Saizmanis	2006	TV series (1 episode)
2007	The Price of Madness		2007	TV series (72 episodes)
2007	Bitter Wine	Banuta	14 May 2007	
2007	Don't Talk About It	Beatrise	2007	
2010	Rudolf's Gold	Emīlija	15 January 2010	
2012	Gulf Stream Under the Iceberg			
2014	Modris	Mother		
2016	Mellow Mud	Mother	26 February 2016	
2018	Swindlers		1 June 2018	
2019	Blizzard of Souls	Mother	8 November 2019	
