= Haralds Sīmanis =

Latvian singer and composer (1951–2022)

- Born: 12 June 1951; Cēsis, Latvian SSR, USSR
- Died: 1 December 2022 (aged 71); Riga, Latvia
- Occupations: Singer; Composer

Haralds Sīmanis (12 June 1951 – 1 December 2022) was a Latvian singer and composer.

== Biography ==
Sīmanis was born in Cēsis to a mixed Latvian-Romani family. He did not receive a musical education but learned to play guitar and organ. In the 1970s, he began collaborating with poet Arvīds Ulme, whose poems he used for many of his songs, such as the organ pieces Mīlestība nekad nebeidzas, Likteņa lietavas, and Par zāli, sāli un Tevi.

Sīmanis gained notoriety in 1980 when he performed the ballad Ezers at that year's Mikrofona aptauja. In 1981, the play Sieviete ārpus mīlestības un nāves was staged at the Valmiera Drama Theatre, during which his songs were played. In 1984, he joined the Vides aizsardzības klubs, organized by Arvīds Ulme, which was one of the first organizations of the Singing Revolution in Latvia. After Latvia's independence, Sīmanis primarily composed music for organ on his own, but collaborated with Ieva Akuratere, Ilze Grunte, Dr. Peacock, and others in his later years.

In 2012, he performed the song Ezers alongside Agita Gabranova on the Latvijas Neatkarīgā Televīzija show Latvijas Zelta talanti.

Haralds Sīmanis died on 1 December 2022, at the age of 71.

== Discography ==
- Es strauta malā slāpēs eju bojā (1994)
- Starp divām gaismām (1996)
- Tavā vārdā (2000)
- Starp divām gaismām (2006)
- Es esmu rīts (2012)
- Par zāli, par sāli un Tevi (2013)
- Pasaka par atslēdziņu (2014)
- Pa apli (2021)
