= The show must go on =

English-language phrase

"The show must go on" is a phrase in show business, meaning that regardless of what happens, whatever show has been planned still has to be staged for the waiting patrons. There is no evidence to suggest that it is the abbreviation of a longer phrase.

The saying and principle are traditional in the theatre, but they both originated in the 19th century with circuses. If an animal got loose or a performer was injured, the ringmaster and the band tried to keep things going so that the crowd would not panic because "it is a point of honour not to let the other players down by deserting them when no understudy is available".

Later on, the phrase was more broadly applied to the hotel business and show business in general. Eventually, the phrase was used to convey the idea that an event or activity must continue even if there are problems or difficulties, with or without regard to actual show business.

== See also ==
- Vesti la giubba (Recitar!), a sad clown's aria from Pagliacci
- List of entertainers who died during a performance
