= Ilkhom Theatre =

Theater company in Tashkent, Uzbekistan

Coordinates: 41°19′06″N 69°15′42″E

Ilkhom Theatre (Ильхом Театр Марка Вайля) is a theatre company based in Tashkent, Uzbekistan. Founded by Mark Weil (Марк Яковлевич Вайль) in 1976, it was the first independent theatre in the Soviet Union, and remains self-supporting to this day.

Weil was murdered in September 2007. The murderers claimed that they took action due to his portrayal of Muhammed in his play Imitating the Qu'ran. Three men were sent to prison for between 17 and 20 years,

His last production was the Greek tragedy The Oresteia; despite his murder the day before it was scheduled to open, the actors went ahead because, according to them and to Mark Weil, the show must go on.

In 2011 Ilkhom Theatre won one of the Prince Claus Awards.

== See also ==
- List of Uzbek theatre groups
- Navoi Theatre
