= Nieuwe Kerk (The Hague) =

Protestant church in The Hague, Netherlands

Coordinates: 52°04′35″N 4°18′54″E

Nieuwe Kerk on the Spui

The Nieuwe Kerk (Dutch pronunciation: [ˈniu.ə ˈkɛr(ə)k]; English: New Church) is a Dutch Baroque Protestant church in The Hague, located across from the modern city hall on the Spui. It was built in 1649 after the Great Church had become too small. Construction was completed in 1656.

== History ==
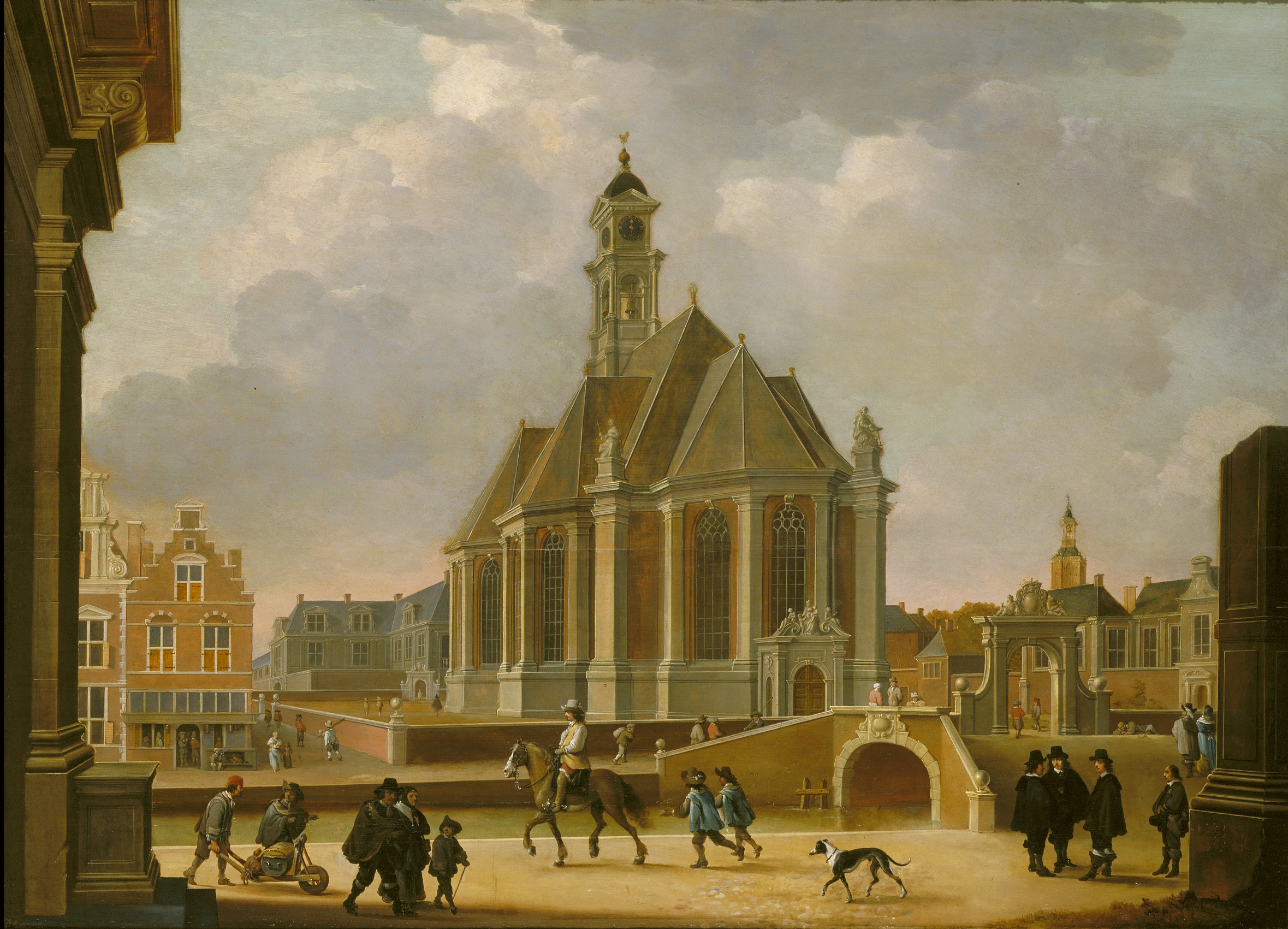
The Nieuwe Kerk on the Spui seen from the east, Bartholomeus van Bassen, 1650

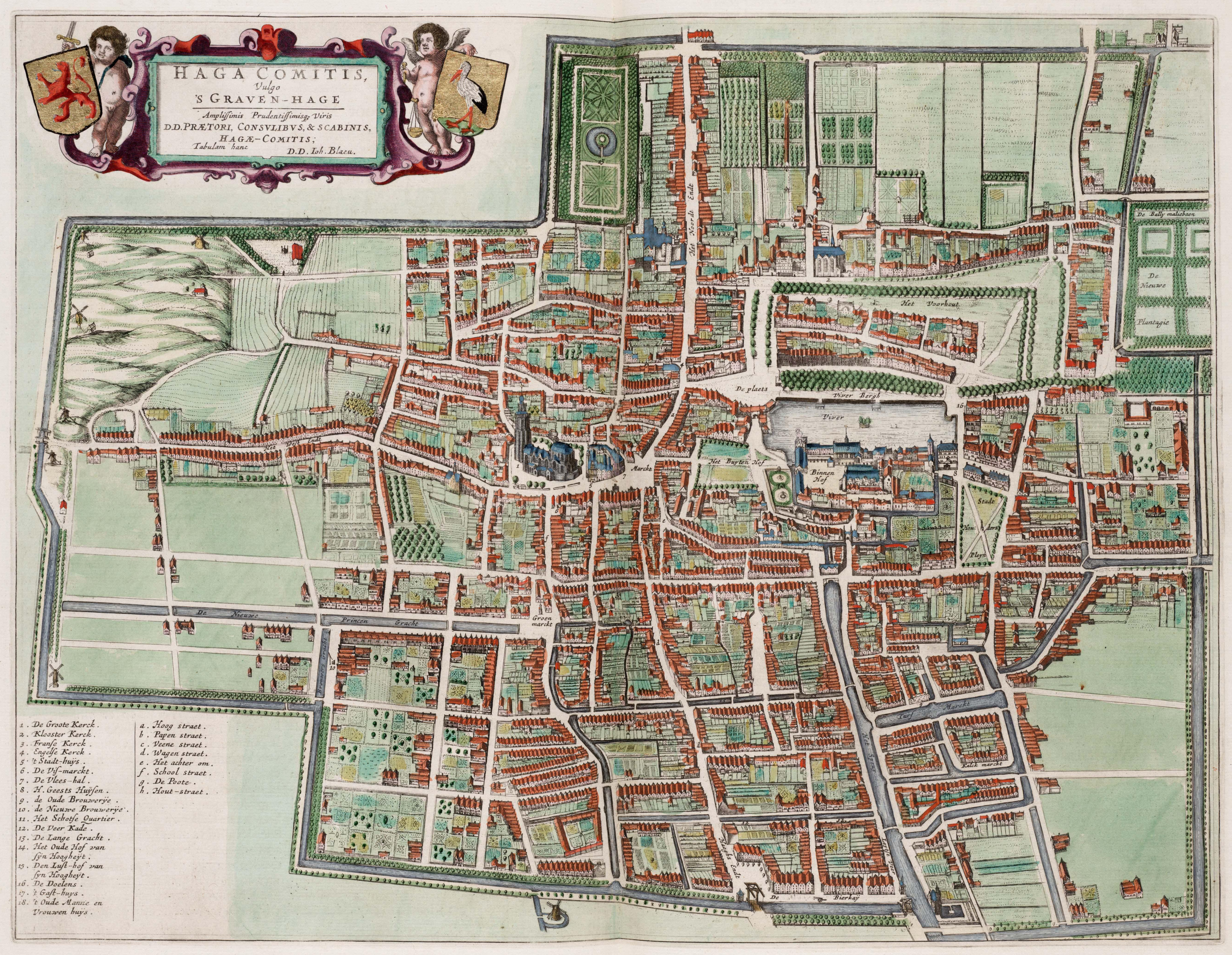
Though the church had not yet been built, the old canals bordering the site can be seen on this 1649 map by Joan Blaeu from the Atlas van Loon

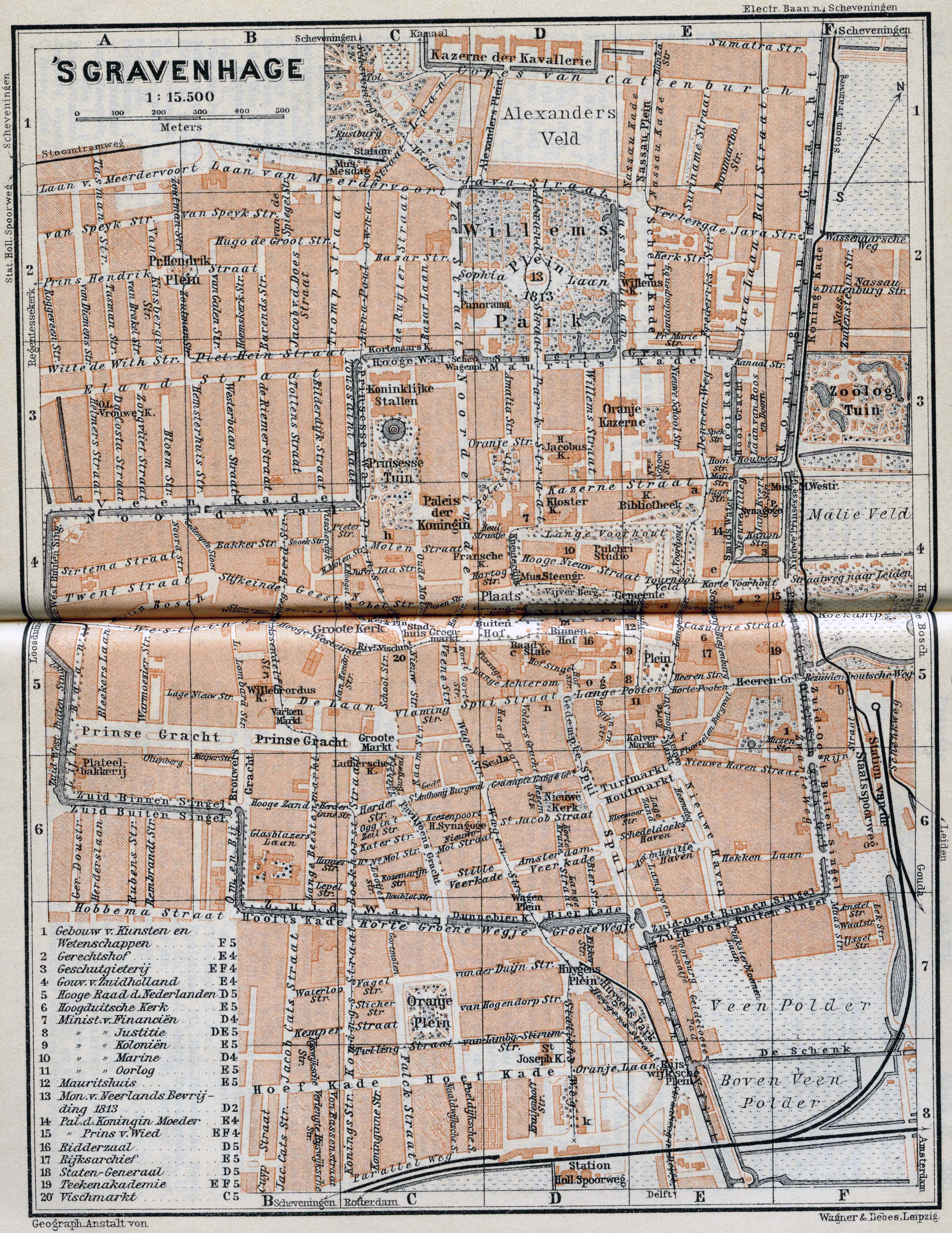
In this Baedeker map from 1905, the canals are all filled in

The church was designed by the architect Peter Noorwits, assisted by the painter and architect Bartholomeus van Bassen. It is considered a highlight of the early Protestant church architecture in the Netherlands. Like many churches of the time, the New Church was designed as a central building. Unlike other central buildings, the church has no simple circular or multifaceted plan but there is a space of two octagonal sections connected by a slightly smaller section in which the pulpit was prepared. The Dutch Baroque architecture of the church shows elements of both Renaissance and Classicism. Two church bells, cast by Coenraat Wegewaert in 1656, hang in their original bell-chairs and measure 100,2 cm and 81,5 cm in diameter. He also designed the clock.

The church houses an organ built in 1702 by the Dutch organ builder Johannes Duyschot (1645–1725), most of whose pipework and case survives. The organ was rebuilt in 1867 by one of the best organ builders of that time, Christian Gottlieb Friedrich Witte. His company adjusted the design of the organ to make it suitable for modern Romantic music.

Until the canals in The Hague were filled in at the end of the 19th century, the New Church was accessed by boat or from the Wagenstraat on a square island between the Spui river, the St. Anthonisburgwal or Rotterdam Veerkade (the old trekschuit route to Rotterdam), the Stille Veerkade or Amsterdam Veerkade (the old trekschuit route to Amsterdam), and the Paviljoensgracht.

== Concert hall ==
In the 20th century, acoustical adjustments were made to the church's interior in a modern face. During the thirties, the church was notable as the most impressive building on the Spui, one of the streets featured in the Dutch game of Monopoly. The church was closed in 1969 after a long restoration and reopened as a concert hall.

== Famous burials ==
The Nieuwe Kerk, or new church (first half 17th century), contains the tombs of the brothers De Witt and of the philosopher Spinoza. Spinoza's tomb is in the churchyard.
