= Līvi (band) =

Latvian musical group

- Origin: Latvia
- Genres: Hard rock, heavy metal
- Years active: 1976–2010, 2017–present
- Labels: Melodiya; Microphone Records
- Members: Ainars Virga Guntars Mucenieks; Jānis Buķelis; Henrijs Mucinieks; Mārtiņš Burkevics; Ilvars Manfelds Aleksejs Balinskis
- Past members: Aivars Brīze Andris Krūziņš; Dainis Virga; Edijs Šnipke; Elmārs Cielavs; Ēriks Ķiģelis; Igo; Ingrida Pavitola; Jānis Grodums; Juris pavītols Laimis Rācenājs; Māris Zīlmanis; Mārtiņš Bērtulis; Modris Šterns; Regīna Sieka; Tālis Pusbarnieks; Tomass Kleins; Valdis Štarks; Vilnis Krieviņš Edgars Silacērps
- Website: www.livi.lv

Līvi is a Latvian hard rock and heavy metal band that was influential in the formation of Latvian rock culture. They are known for their poetic lyrics and guitar solos.

The band was founded by Ēriks Ķiģelis and Juris Pavītols in Liepāja in the USSR, in the Latvian Soviet Socialist Republic in 1976. They started out as a pop rock band playing various gigs around Latvia. From 1977 to 1985, the band experimented while trying to find their own musical style, resulting in songs from pop to heavy rock. Throughout this period, however, the band espoused patriotism and anti-Sovietism. After the death of Ķiģelis in 1986, Ainars Virga joined the band, leading to a new era of anthemic ballads, heavy rock, and rebellious themes. Virga went on to compose some of the best-known Latvian hard rock songs.

Līvi recorded nine albums during their existence. Their songs include "Dzimtā valoda", "Dzelsgriezējs", "Meitene zeltene", "Saldus saule", "Piedod man", "Zīlīte", "Tikai tev un man", and "Pāri visam."

== History ==
=== 1976–1985 ===
Līvi is considered to have begun in 1976, although another band named Līvi existed for a short time before that, also founded by Juris Pavītols, a well known guitarist in the 1970s. Līvi was founded by Pavītols and Ēriks Ķiģelis, a young guitarist from Saldus. Both were determined to create a distinct sound for Latvian rock. Along with Pavītols's wife Ingrīda, drummer Andris Krūmiņš, and "the dinosaur of rock" Jānis Grodums, the pair formed a band, taking the name of Pavītols's first band. "Līvi" is Latvian for the Livonians, a now nearly extinct ethnic group living in the vicinity of Liepāja who had a reputation in legend for making their living by pirating and fighting foreign oppressors. The band played small-time gigs in their early years, mostly performing sad songs written by Pavītols and sung by his wife. They also performed some faster, harder songs composed by Ķiģelis.

In 1978, Ķiģelis left the band, stating that his and Pavītols's artistic differences were impossible to overcome. He then formed his own band, Corpus, and tried to distance himself from his former musical partners. Līvi replaced him with Modris Šterns. In 1980, Ķiģelis returned to the band, along with three new members: 17-year-old singer Rodrigo Fomins, drummer Vilnis Krieviņš, and the band's sound engineer Juris Jakovļevs. Krūmiņš and Šterns left the band around this time. Ķiģelis immediately returned to songwriting, and Līvi's popularity rose, leading to their appearance in many music festivals and the recording of their first album, the self-titled Līvi, released in 1983.

Latvia at that time was a part of the Soviet Union, and rock bands were censored by the Communist Party. The Soviet regime saw a potential enemy in the rebellious Latvian rockers, and in 1981 it banned Līvi from playing any concerts. Līvi responded in 1982 with a new hit single, "Zīlīte."

In 1984, Līvi was featured in Riga Film Studio's musical comedy, Vajadzīga soliste (Soloist Needed), performing the song Amors Superstars on stage. The film also featured a variety of bands from Latvia's pop and rock scene of that era.

Šterns later returned to the band, but Pavītols and Ķiģelis continued to feud, leading the former to leave the band forever. His wife followed, not fitting in with the band's harder music. She still participated, however, in recording for Līvi's second album, Aprīļa pilieni (April's Raindrops). The band was briefly joined by keyboard player Tālis Pusbarnieks. Together they successfully record another album—Iedomu pilsēta (Phantasm City) and became the most popular band of that time.

Pusbarnieks, Fomins, Šterns, and Kreiviņš left the band in 1984 in order to pursue their own musical projects. Ķiģelis saved the band by hiring vocalist Aivars Brīze (later to become known as "the voice of Latvian rock"), keyboardist Guntars Mucenieks, and drummer Valdis Štarks. In 1985, however, Ķiģelis died in a car accident after a concert.

=== 1986–2010 ===
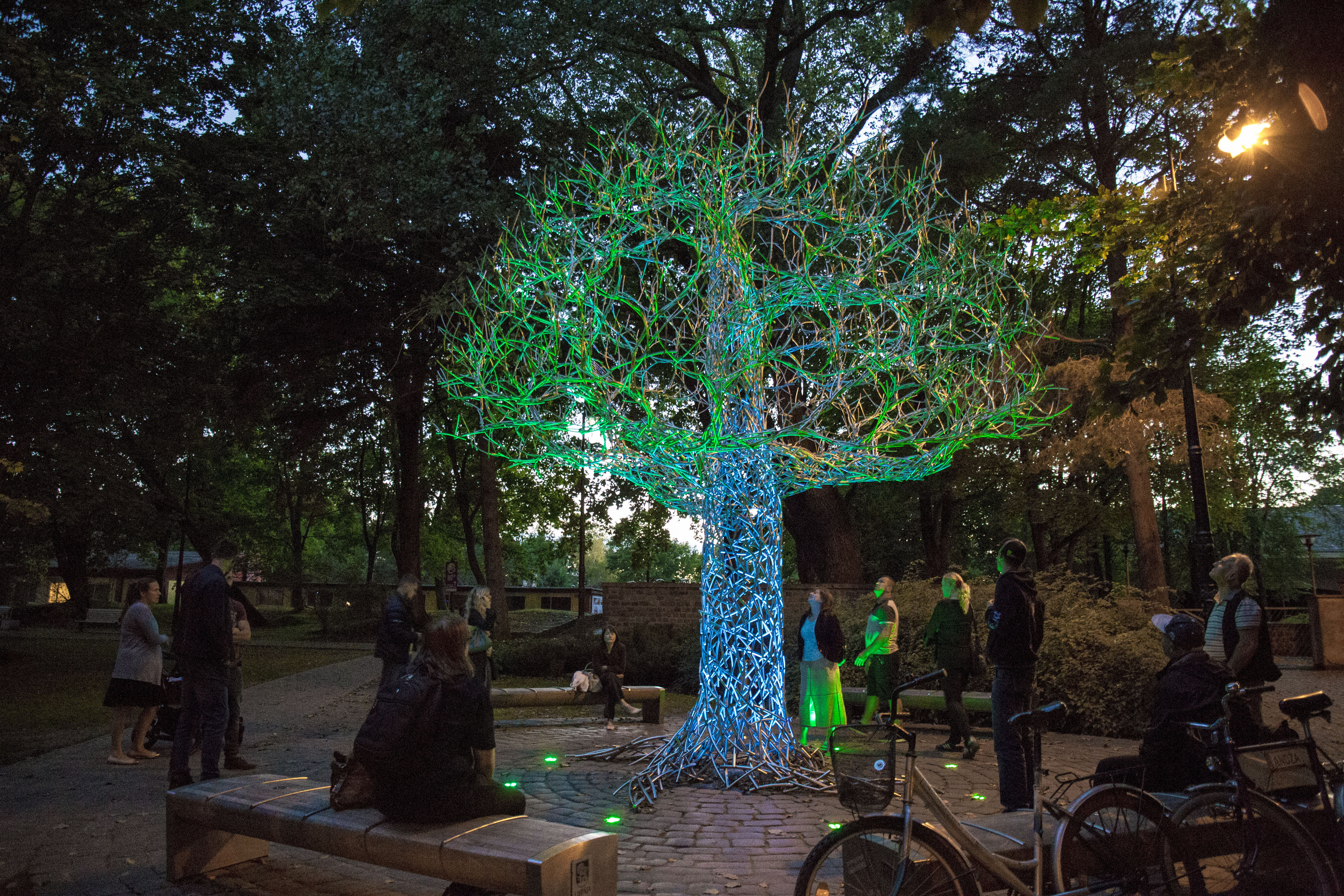
Spoku koks (Ghost tree), an object dedicated to the band in Liepāja

Ķiģelis's protégé Ainars Virga became the band's new leader in 1986. Virga was a fan of heavy metal bands like Black Sabbath, Scorpions, Deep Purple, and Led Zeppelin, so he set out to make Līvi more like them, with a harder sound, more guitar solos, and rebellious attitudes. His first song was "Dzimtā valoda", an emotional ballad and an appraisal of Latvian language and culture.

In 1987 Štarks was replaced by Ainars' younger brother Dainis, and in 1989, Tomass Kleins joined the band as a regular guitarist. At the time of the fall of the Soviet Union, Līvi had recorded dozens of hits and featured their most stable lineup, consisting of Brīze, Ainars Virga, Kleins, Grodums, and Dainis Virga.

In 1988 Līvi released their second studio album LIVI. Half of the songs being Ķigelis' last compositions, the other half being new Virga, Grodums and Mucenieks songs.

In 1994 Līvi released the studio album Karogi (Flags), their second recording since the death of Ķiģelis in 1985. The album went double platinum. The band toured across Northern Europe and Latvia to promote Karogi. In December 1994, Līvi released an album called Spoku Koks ("The Ghost Tree"). It was recorded, cut, mixed, and delivered to stores in one night.

Two years later, Līvi released K.M.K.V.P. or "Kas Mums Var Ko Padarīt" (Who Can Do Anything To Us). Singles from the album included "Meitene", "Bize", and a jazz version of their old hit "Dzelsgriezējs". In 1997, Līvi recorded their bestselling album Bailes par ziņģēm (Fear about Songs), and dedicated it to the memory of Ķiģelis. Shortly after the release of the album, long-time vocalist Aivars Brīze left the group. Two years later, Līvi recorded their seventh album, Viva.

In 2000 Līvi recorded an album entitled 2001 in homage to the previous millennium. In 2001 Virga went to the USA and Līvi played without him for almost 2 years.

In 2003 Virga returned from the USA. Brize returned to the band as well. The band had big plans, but on the 26th of July, 2003, while driving back from the festival Oldies Rock from Daugavpils, the car driven by Virga was involved in an accident. Drummer Dainis and sound-engineer Juris Jakovļevs died from their wounds. Līvi subsequently recorded a new album, called Pāri visam (Over everything), and dedicated it to all rock musicians who have died in accidents.

On June 15, 2010 the oldest member of the group Jānis Grodums died and the band broke up. In summer of 2013 they played a couple more concerts together.

However, in 2017 Aivars Virga announced that the group would reunite. They then proceeded to release a new album called ''Bez stepšeļiem''. in 2019 They released another album ''Pluss mīnuss''. They continue to have occasional concerts.

== Current members ==
- Ainars Virga
- Guntars Mucenieks
- Jānis Buķelis
- Henrijs Mucenieks
- Edgars Silacērps
- Ilvars Manfelds
- Aleksejs Balinskis (Alex)

== Former members ==
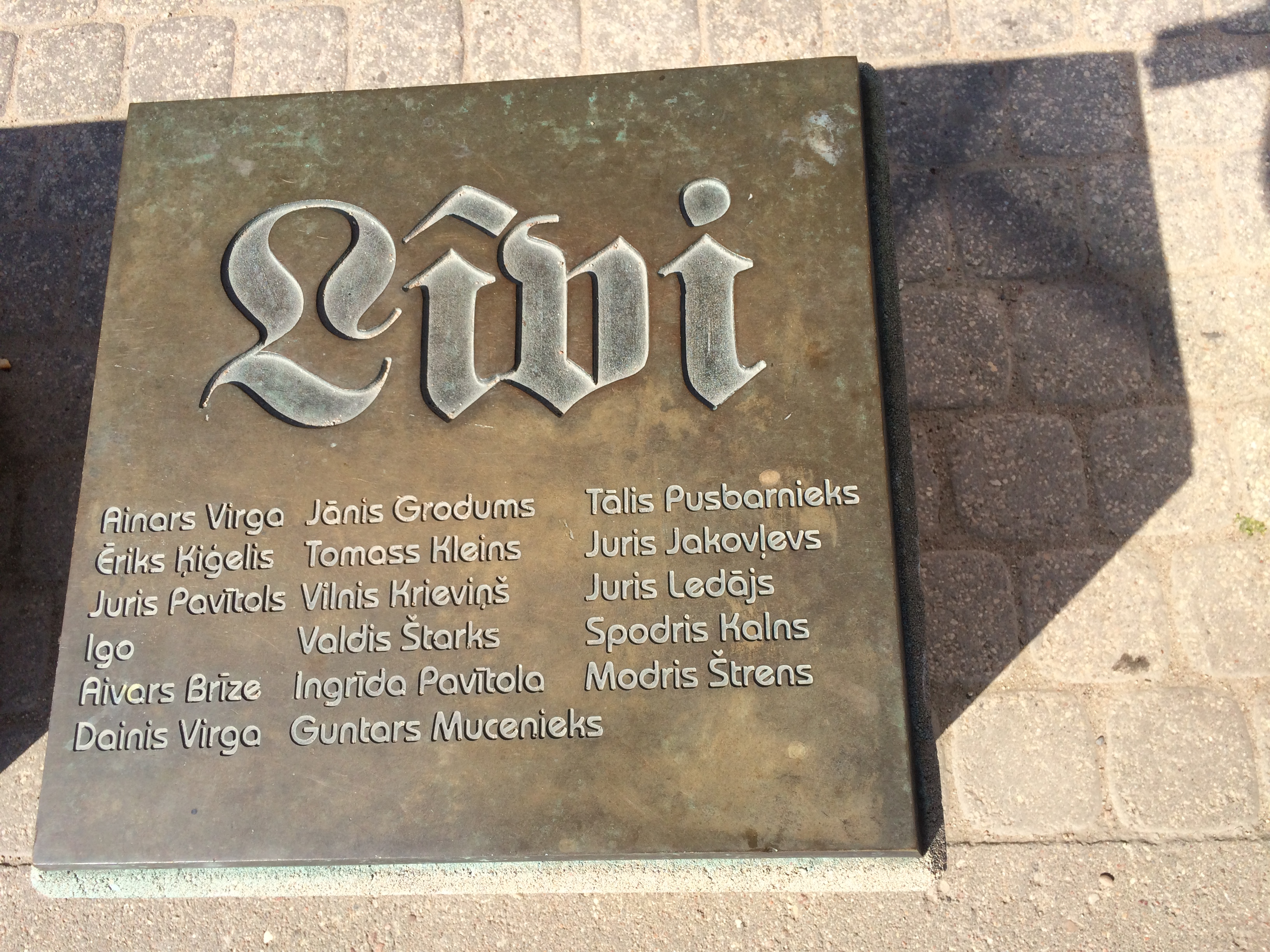
Memorial plaque to Līvi group in Liepāja

- Mārtiņš Bērtulis: guitar
- Aivars Brīze: vocals
- Rodrigo Fomins: vocals
- Jānis Grodums: bass guitar, vocals
- Ēriks Ķiģelis: guitar, vocals
- Tomass Kleins: guitar
- Vilnis Krieviņš: drums
- Andris Krūmiņš: drums
- Guntars Mucenieks: keyboard, vocals
- Ingrīda Pavītola: vocals
- Juris Pavītols: guitar, vocals
- Tālis Pusbarnieks: keyboard
- Valdis Skujiņš: guitar
- Edijs Šnipke: guitar
- Valdis Štarks: drums
- Ainars Virga: vocals, guitar
- Dainis Virga (deceased): drums
- Māris Zīlmanis: drums
- Edgars Silacērps: guitar

== Discography ==
- Aprīļa pilieni, EP (1985)
- Iedomu pilsēta (1986)
- Līvi aka Kurzemei - saules ceļš (1988)
- Karogi (1994)
- Spoku koks (1994)
- K.M.K.V.P. (1996)
- Bailes par ziņģēm (1997)
- Viva (1998)
- 2001 (2000)
- Līvi Zelts 1 (2002)
- Pāri visam (2004)
- Līvi 1995-2005 (2005)
- Mēs nešķirsimies (2007)
- Nezāles neiznīkst (2010)
- Bez štepseļiem (2018)

== Videography ==
- Līvi & Liepājas simfoniskais orķestris: Koncerts bildēs 2004 DVD (2005)
- Līvi & Sinfoniskais orķestris: Nacionālajā operā 2006 DVD (2010)
