= Mirdza Zīvere =

Latvian singer, producer, and theatre/opera director

Mirdza Zīvere (born 20 September 1953) is a Latvian singer, producer and theatre and opera director.
