= Imants Kalniņš =

Latvian composer

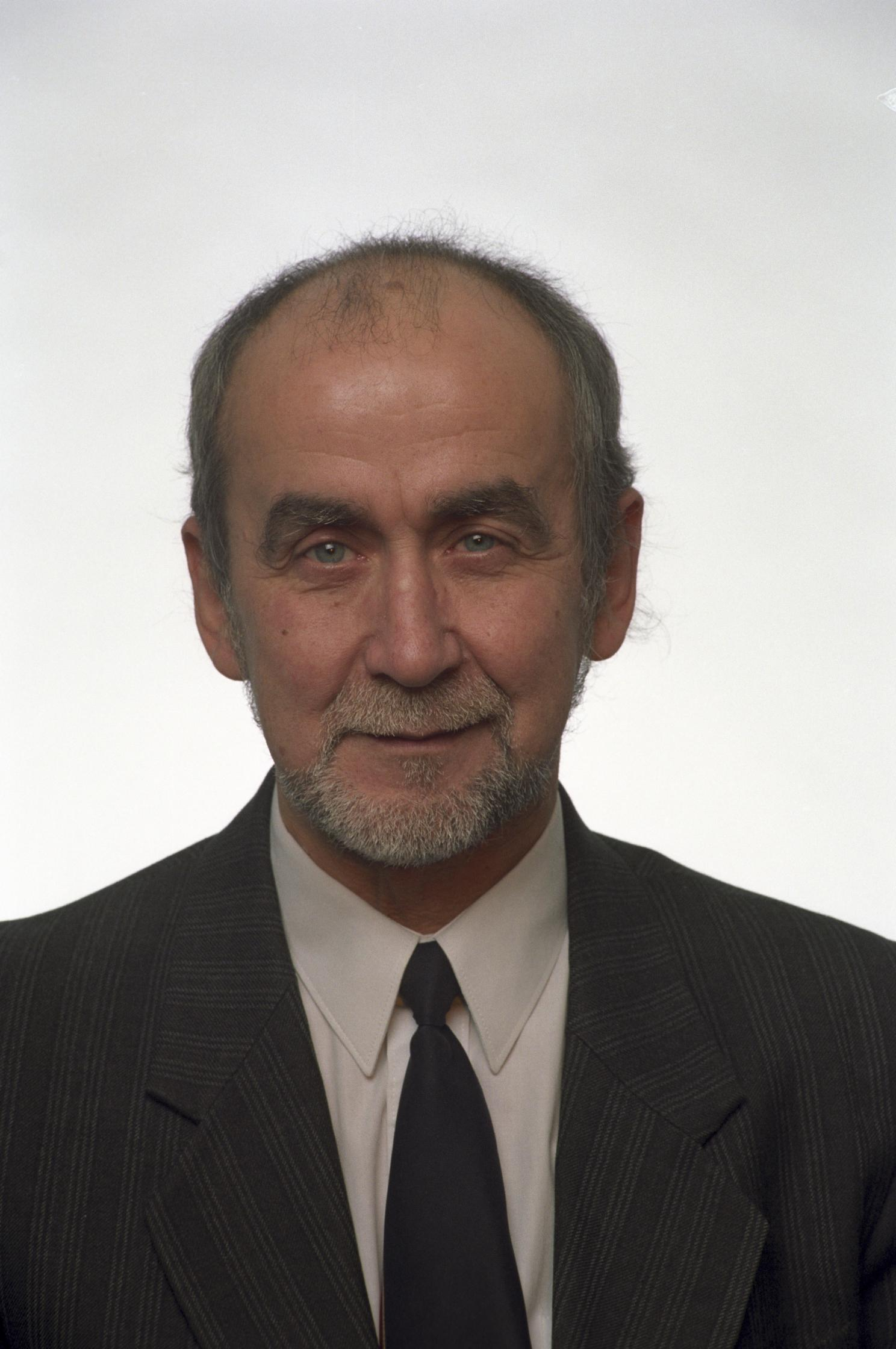

Background information
- Born: 26 May 1941 (age 84)
- Origin: Riga, Latvian SSR (now Latvia)
- Genres: Classical music, Choral music, Rock music
- Occupation(s): composer, songwriter
- Years active: 1964–present

Imants Kalniņš (born 26 May 1941) is a Latvian composer, musician and politician. Having studied classical and choral music, he has written seven symphonies, several operas (including the first rock opera in the USSR, Ei, jūs tur!), oratorios, cantatas, choir songs, a lot of movie and theater music. However, he is generally best known for his rock songs. In 2021, Kalniņš received the Grand Music Award for lifetime achievement.

Furthermore, he served as a member of the 5th, 7th, 8th, and 9th sitting of the Saeima, the parliament of Latvia, from 1993 to 1995 and again from 1998 through 2010, representing the For Fatherland and Freedom/LNNK party.

== Life and career ==
Kalniņš was born 26 May 1941 in Riga, Latvian SSR. During the 1960s, Kalniņš led the Liepāja rock band 2xBBM, which was extremely loved because of its heartfelt songs and hippy-like lifestyle. Kalniņš became the symbol of the spirituality, rebellion and worldview of the generation, and it was emphasized by the fact the band was forced to stop playing because of the pressure from official institutions. However, this did not stop the music of Kalniņš from being played by the extremely popular band Menuets, which almost exclusively plays songs written by Kalniņš.

During the 1970s, Kalniņš returned to writing symphonic music. In 1984, he wrote the rock oratorio Kā jūra, kā zeme, kā debess (Like the sea, like the earth, like the sky) together with Juris Kulakovs and Juris Sējāns. The oratorio was the first thing played by the band Pērkons for the general public. With it Kalniņš returned to rock and roll once more. He wrote many new songs for Pērkons, and these same songs led him to start his own band, Turaidas Roze in 1985, however, it never gained the recognition and adoration as Menuets and Pērkons.

During the Singing Revolution, Kalniņš took an active part in the Popular Front of Latvia, which played the most important role in ending Latvia's occupation by the USSR.

The festival most associated with Kalniņš is the Imantdienas ('The Days of Imants'), extremely popular during the Soviet times and therefore banned. The tradition was reintroduced in 1995, and since then has happened every year (with the exception of 1997, when the composer was away on a trip, and 2009 after the 2008 Latvian financial crisis). It has remained at least as popular as before.

Lately, Imants Kalniņš has been working together with the well-known Latvian musician Ainars Mielavs!, and their collaboration has resulted in some albums containing primarily music by Kalniņš, such as Par lietām, kas tā ar' nekad nepāriet (About things that never truly go away) (1997), Es redzēju sapnī (I Saw in a dream) (1998) and I Love You (1999; despite the English title, the lyrics are mostly in Latvian in this album).

In 2000, music for the 1973 movie "Blow, wind, blow" was re-recorded by the Liepāja Symphony Orchestra as well as many recognized singers.

In 1973, Kalniņš composed the song "In the city where the wind is born!", which became the official anthem of Liepāja in 1999.

In April 2015, after his translation of Quran from Arabic to Latvian, Kalniņš was reported to have converted Islam by some outlets, but Kalniņš himself has later refuted these claims.

== Private life ==
Kalniņš has been married five times. In total, he has 7 children. The third marriage, the longest of the former wedlocks, was with the actress Helga Dancberga who died in 2019. They had three children, Dana Kalniņa-Zaķe who became the lead for the Latvian Association of Professional Health Care Chaplains, actress Rēzija Kalniņa and pastor Krists Kalniņš. Currently, he is married to Agra (since 1999).

== Works ==
=== Orchestral ===
Symphony

- No. 1 (1964)
- No. 2 (1965)
- No. 3 (1968)
- No. 4 with Soprano (11 poems by Kelly Cherry, 1973)
- No. 4 (revised without vocal soloist)
- No. 5 (1979)
- No. 6 with Choir (Rabindranath Tagore, 2001)
- No. 7 (2015)

Concerto

- Concerto for Cello (1963)
- Concerto for Orchestra (1966)
- Concerto for Oboe (2012)

Other

- Symphonic Miniature, Santa Cruz (2015)

=== Vocal ===
Oratorios:

- October Oratorio (1967)
- The Poet and the Mermaid
- Morning Hours

Rock Opera

- Hello, Out There (Ei, jūs turl!) (1971)
- I Played, I Danced

Incidental music for Theater

- The Prince and The Pauper
- The Three Musketeers
- Motorcycle (poetry of Imants Ziedonis) (1967)

=== Film ===
- Blow, Wind (Pūt, vējiņi! (1973)
