= Zigmars Liepiņš =

Latvian musical composer

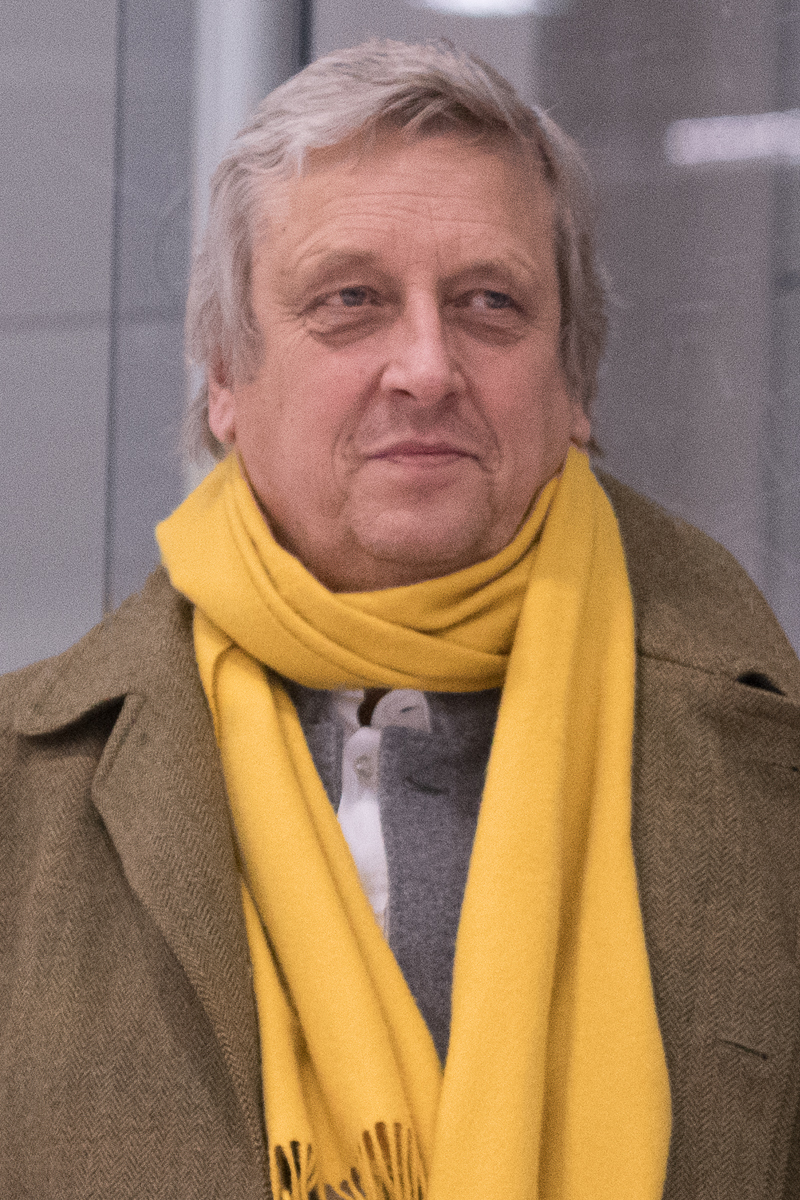
- Born: Zigmars Liepiņš; 14 October 1952; Liepāja, USSR (now Latvia)
- Occupation(s): Composer, keyboard player
- Works: Parīzes Dievmātes katedrāle
- Spouse: Mirdza Zīvere
- Children: 2

Zigmars Liepiņš (born 14 October 1952 in Liepāja, Latvian SSR, USSR (now: Latvia) is a Latvian composer, keyboard player and the chairman of the board for the Latvian National Opera. Liepiņš has written songs for choirs, solo artists, orchestras, films, theatres, and operas.

== Early life and education ==
Zigmars Liepiņš was born in a family of musicians in Liepāja on 14 October 1952. His father Jānis Liepiņš was a violinist and the first person in Liepāja to learn how to play an electric guitar, he also had an important role in the foundation of Liepāja rock. His mother Lidija had a diploma is singing. The first opera Liepiņs saw was Pyotr Tchaikovsky's The Queen of Spades in Liepāja Theatre in early childhood.

In 1971 he graduated from Liepāja Music Secondary School (now Liepāja Music, Art and Design Secondary School) and from Latvian State Conservatoire in 1976 (now – Jāzeps Vītols Latvian Academy of Music).

== Career ==
At the age of seventeen, he started composing and joined Liepāja band Santa which he left a year later. In 1970 band Santa took part in the festival Liepājas Dzintars where Liepiņš received an award for the best folk song arrangement.

Liepiņš was a keyboard player and songwriter for band Modo (1973 – 1976 and 1977–1982), and also their manager (1978–1982). While in the Soviet Army (1976–1978) Liepiņš was in band Zvaigznīte. Upon returning from the army, Liepiņš re-joined Modo. In 1982 Modo changed their name to Opus and under Liepiņš' management existed until 1989.

In the 1980s, Liepiņš became popular with numerous hits of the time (Vēl ir laiks, Viss kārtībā, Ceļojums, Dziesma par rozīti, Sentiments). In 1983 Liepiņš wrote the soundtrack for the film Vajadzīga soliste (Soloist Needed) where he also played himself. It was his debut in cinema music.

== Other work ==
1989–1992 Liepiņš was the director of Showimpex, a concert agency, 1991–1995 – the director of a recording company L&M. 1992–2007 Liepiņš was the president and shareholder of Radio SWH. Since 2013 he has been the chairman of the board for the Latvian National Opera.

== Personal life ==
Liepiņš has two children with a Latvian singer, producer, film director and entrepreneur Mirdza Zīvere – Zane Kursīte and Jānis Liepiņš. Liepins' son Jānis Liepiņš is a conductor in the Latvian National Opera.

== Works ==
=== Music for choirs and solo artists ===
- 2000: song cycle Teika for a mixed choir and soloist
- 2001: Tēvzemei un Brīvība for a symphonic orchestra, mixed choir and soloist
- 2007: Dziedot dzimu, dziedot augu

=== Film scores ===
- 1984: Vajadzīga soliste
- 1987: Sēd uz sliekšņa pasaciņa
- 1988: Skaitāmpanti
- 1990: Ness un Nesija

=== Music for theatre ===
- 1976: Spartaks (Latvian National Theatre)
- 1977: Emīls un Berlīnes zēni (Latvian National Theatre)
- 1979: Iedomu spoguļi (Latvian National Opera)
- 1979: Žanna D’Arka
- 1981: Iela (Latvian National Theatre)
- 1985: Punktiņa un Antons (Liepāja Theatre)
- 1985: Atvadu izrāde (Valmiera Theatre)
- 1986: Ķiršu dārzs (Valmiera Theatre)
- 1987: Mirabo (Latvian National Theatre)
- 1987: Momo
- 1992: Suns (Latvian National Theatre)
- 1993: Jēzus (Latvian National Theatre)
- 1995: Svešinieki šeit (Latvian National Theatre)
- 1996: Trešais vārds (Latvian National Theatre)
- 1996: Trīs musketieri (Latvian National Theatre)
- 1996: Trīs draugi
- 1998: Solis laika
- 2007: musical drama Adata (Latvian National Theatre)

=== Opera ===
- 1988: rock opera Lāčplēsis
- 1997: opera Parīzes Dievmātes katedrāle (Latvian National Opera)
- 2000: opera No Rozes un asinīm (Latvian National Opera)

=== Other ===
- 1975: Instrumental cycle Diennakts
- 1985: Instrumental music Pulss 2
- 1994: Vakara mūzika
- 1996: Music for the firework display in Ventspils
- 2008: Kapteiņa stāsti
- 2012: Concerto for a violin and orchestra
- 2014: Transcendental Oratorio

== Awards and nominations ==
In 1997 Liepiņš received the Latvian Music Award for the opera Parīzes Dievmātes katedrāle (Notre-Dame de Paris).

In 2002 Liepiņš was awarded the Order of the Three Stars (Triju Zvaigžņu ordenis).
