= Religious to Damn =

- Origin: Brooklyn, New York, USA
- Genres: Indie rock alternative rock
- Years active: 2009–2012
- Label: M'Lady's Records
- Members: Zohra Atash; Joshua Strachan; Charlie Schmid
- Website: http://www.religioustodamn.com/

Religious to Damn was an indie rock band from Brooklyn, New York fronted by Afghan-American songwriter Zohra Atash. Atash formed the group in 2009 in collaboration with several additional musicians and producers including Joshua Strachan and Jim Sclavunos. Their music was described by the Village Voice as "a mix of desert strum, hypnotic pulse, spirited-away synths, Lynchian weirdness, and Fleetwood Maximalism".

== History ==
Religious to Damn made their live debut at the Wierd Records weekly party in New York City.

In 2010, they released their first single, "Falls Down Again", which featured production and drumming from Sclavunos (a member of Nick Cave and the Bad Seeds and Grinderman, also known for his work with the Vanity Set, Sonic Youth, 8 Eyed Spy, Teenage Jesus and the Jerks and the Cramps). The single was mixed by Warren Defever of His Name Is Alive.

Following that release, Atash formed what would become the core of the group with Strachan (also of Vaura and Blacklist) acting as full-time collaborator and co-producer, and Charlie Schmid on drums and percussion.

The band's first album release as a full band, Glass Prayer, was mixed by Brandon Curtis and included Jesse Krakow on bass guitar for several tracks and Tamaryn providing guest vocals on two songs. It was released digitally in early May 2010 by Troubleman, and on vinyl in December 2010 by M'Ladys. Glass Prayer was named Rough Trade's Album of the Week and was promoted with several music videos, including one directed by Jason Akira Somma. Live dates in support of the record included performances with Jarboe, Tamaryn and Chelsea Wolfe. Shortly after the release of Glass Prayer, Atash also acted as touring vocalist for A Storm of Light, performing parts live that had originally been recorded by Jarboe and Lydia Lunch.

In January 2012, the band self-released the single "Lovely Day". The song showcased a more electronic sound which was assisted by Led Er Est's Shawn O'Sullivan.

In October 2012, Brooklyn Vegan announced that Religious to Damn had disbanded/retired and that Atash and Strachan had reconfigured under the name Azar Swan.

== Discography ==
=== Studio albums ===
- Glass Prayer (2010, M'Lady's Records)

=== Singles ===
- "Falls Down Again" (2010, M'Lady's Records)
- "Lovely Day" (2012, self-released)
