= Vienmēr klusi =

1984 album by Dzeltenie Pastnieki

Studio album by Dzeltenie Pastnieki
- Released: 1984
- Recorded: 1983–1984 ("Oktobris", "Pie Lielās Omas")
- Genre: Synthpop, new wave, post-punk
- Length: 42:36
- Label: Ingus Baušķenieka ieraksti
- Producer: Ingus Baušķenieks, Mārtiņš Rutkis and Viesturs Slava

Dzeltenie Pastnieki chronology
Alise (1984)	Vienmēr klusi (1984)	Depresīvā pilsēta (1986)

Vienmēr klusi is the fourth album by Latvian band Dzeltenie Pastnieki, released through magnitizdat in 1984, and 'officially' in 2004.

== Track listing ==
1. "Vienmēr klusi" (Ingus Baušķenieks/Andris Kalniņš/Mārtiņš Rutkis/Viesturs Slava/Zigmunds Streiķis/Roberts Gobziņš) – 7:08
2. "Mazais autobuss" (Baušķenieks/Kalniņš/Rutkis/Slava/Streiķis/Hardijs Lediņš/Juris Boiko) – 3:34
3. "Kāpēc tu man saki 'Jā'?" (Baušķenieks/Kalniņš/Rutkis/Slava/Streiķis/Gobziņš) – 4:29
4. "Pastnieks trakais" (Baušķenieks/Kalniņš/Rutkis/Slava/Streiķis/Gobziņš) – 1:00
5. "Mēness deja" (Baušķenieks/Kalniņš/Rutkis/Slava/Streiķis/Lediņš/Boiko) – 7:27
6. "JJJ - ???" (Baušķenieks/Kalniņš/Rutkis/Slava/Streiķis) – 0:53
7. "Sliekutēva vaļasprieks" (Baušķenieks/Kalniņš/Rutkis/Slava/Streiķis/Gobziņš) – 3:14
8. "Parastais pastnieks" (Baušķenieks/Kalniņš/Rutkis/Slava/Streiķis/Lediņš/Boiko) – 4:18
9. "Čemodāns" (Baušķenieks) – 0:26
10. "Milžu cīņa" (Baušķenieks/Kalniņš/Rutkis/Slava/Streiķis/Lediņš) – 5:11
11. "Alise un runcis" (Baušķenieks/Kalniņš/Rutkis/Slava/Streiķis) – 2:04
12. "Svešā malā" (Baušķenieks/Kalniņš/Rutkis/Slava/Streiķis/Gobziņš) – 4:08

== Track details ==
- "Pastnieks trakais" is a different song written around an edited backing track from "Trakais pastnieks" off the album Man ļoti patīk jaunais vilnis (1982). Roberts Gobziņš is on vocals instead of Ingus Baušķenieks.
- "JJJ - ???" is a reversed excerpt from "Man ļoti patīk jaunais vilnis", again from the album of the same name.
- "Čemodāns" is a brief whistle/guitar reprise of the song from Bolderājas dzelzceļš (1981).

== Release history ==
Region	Date	Label	Format	Catalog	Ref.
Latvia	August 18, 2004	Ingus Baušķenieka ieraksti	CD	IBCD 204	
Latvia	August 2007	Ingus Baušķenieka ieraksti	digital download (MP3)	–	
Latvia	April 12, 2016	Ingus Baušķenieka ieraksti	digital download (MP3, FLAC, etc.)	–	
