= Joshua Strachan =

Musician

- Born: Joshua Strawn
- Genres: Avant-garde metal, dream pop, cold wave, deathrock, black metal, post-punk, shoegaze, industrial music, noise music, post-industrial music, art rock, New Romantic, drone music, progressive rock, industrial techno, EBM
- Occupations: Musician, songwriter, vocalist, multi-instrumentalist
- Instruments: Vocals, guitar, bass guitar, keyboards
- Labels: Wierd, M'Lady's, Profound Lore Records, Handmade Birds, Flenser, Pendu Sound
- Formerly of: The Diplomats, Blacklist, Religious to Damn, Azar Swan

Joshua Strawn (born 1976), known professionally as Joshua Strachan, is a songwriter, record producer, vocalist and multi-instrumentalist.

== Biography ==
Joshua Strachan was born in a suburb of Des Moines, Iowa, grew up and currently resides in Roanoke, Virginia. In Roanoke, Strachan met Jeremy Kolosine of the seminal electropunk band Futurisk, who was then playing in a dream pop/shoegaze band called Shakespace. Kolosine invited Strachan to join the band, first as a keyboardist, then later as a vocalist and guitarist. Simultaneously, Strachan took up playing bass in the Diplomats. Shakespace recorded one EP and one album, while the Diplomats recorded an EP which was mixed by R.E.M. veteran Mitch Easter. The Diplomats disbanded before the EP was released, and Shakespace disbanded during the recording and mixing of their last album.

Strachan moved to New York in 2004, and upon meeting bassist Ryan Rayhill, the two formed Blacklist. Blacklist released several recordings on Wierd Records, a label which Strachan was closely involved with from its inception until its conclusion, not only as an artist, but also as a co-thinker and writer. He joined Religious to Damn in 2009, and after Blacklist announced an indefinite hiatus from recording and touring, formed Vaura in early 2010 with Kevin Hufnagel, Toby Driver and Religious to Damn drummer Charlie Schmid.

In mid-2012, Strachan launched Azar Swan, a collaboration with Zohra Atash, the lead singer and primary songwriter of Religious to Damn. In 2013, he started a solo project called Vain Warr. In 2016, while living in New Orleans he launched the record label Primal Architecture Records which has released music by acts such as Kelly Moran as well as his own projects. Azar Swan's album, Savage Exile, was released in 2017.

In the summer of 2019, Blacklist reformed to play a festival show in Brooklyn, NY and alluded to a possibility of future releases and performances. In the winter of 2019 Desolation Colony, an electronic project with Justin Vial, played its first show opening for Italian composer Fabio Frizzi in New Orleans.

In late 2020, the debut LP by The Red Window entitled Afterlife was released, a collaboration between Strachan and former Shakespace bandmate Jeremy Kolosine. In mid 2021, Strachan released "Deerstalking" by Meridiane, a project with 4AD artists Pieter Nooten of Clan of Xymox and Warren Defever of His Name Is Alive.

== Influences ==
Due to the diversity of Strachan's musical endeavors, the influences he has cited span multiple genres, including Scott Walker, The Comsat Angels, Black Sabbath and Cocteau Twins, the Manic Street Preachers, Ulver, Blut Aus Nord, Comus, the Sisters of Mercy, Prurient, Kate Bush, David Sylvian and Laurie Anderson.

== Lyrical themes ==
When being interviewed for Blacklist in 2009, Strachan described his lyrics as "militantly humanistic". Though lacking in many overt references, their album Midnight of the Century alluded to superstition and religion in almost every song, encompassing all three major monotheisms as well as Stalinism and fascism which Strachan has called "political superstitions."

In an interview for Vaura in 2019, Strachan referenced cosmic horror, saying, "The nightmare visions that inspired Sables are simultaneously of an omnicide, and of an end to humanity while human beings still continue to exist materially. Humanity being the word we tend to use to refer to our kindness, our ability to understand one another and allow for the existence of others, our ability to be graceful and make peace."

== Non-musical endeavors ==
Strachan has written about his background in political action and organizing, from a brief stint with ACORN in the early 2000s, to being employed by the Human Rights Campaign and the Working Families Party. While attending The New School, Strachan was active with two philosophical organizations, the Nietzsche Circle and the Foucault Society, both created by Nietzsche scholar Yunus Tuncel. He also befriended his professor Christopher Hitchens out of a shared interest in the history of the secularism of the left, and the two were in contact until Hitchens' death in 2011.

While living in New York, Strachan worked full time as a social media analyst for ad research firm Competitrack, and part time as a freelance journalist. His writing on politics, music, and culture has appeared in The Daily Beast, Talkhouse as well as in feminist publications such as BUST, and Slutist.

== Discography ==
=== With Shakespace ===
- Air Sign Orange EP (2000, Happy Couples Never Last)
- This Sleeping Heart album (2001, self-released)

=== With the Diplomats ===
- Kindly Put Your Trousers On EP (unreleased, 2000)

=== With Blacklist ===
- Blacklist EP (2006, self-released)
- Solidaire EP (2007 Wierd Records)
- Midnight of the Century album (2009, Wierd Records)
- Disorder single (2020, self-released)
- Afterworld album (2022, Profound Lore Records)
- Arms of a Cross single (2023, Profound Lore Records)
- "The Witching Hour" single (2024, aufnahme + wiedergabe)

=== With Religious to Damn ===
- "Falls Down Again" single (2010, M'Lady's Records)
- Glass Prayer album (2010, M'Lady's Records)
- "Lovely Day" single (2012, self-released)

=== With Vaura ===
- Selenelion album (2012, Wierd Records)
- The Missing album (2013, Profound Lore Records)
- Sables album (2019, Profound Lore Records)
- Vista of Deviant Anatomies album (2022, Primal Architecture Records)

=== With Azar Swan ===
- "Amrika" single (2012, self-released)
- "Lusty" single (2013, self-released)
- "In My Mouth" single (2013, Pendu Sound Recordings)
- Dance Before the War album (2013, Handmade Birds)
- And Blow Us a Kiss album (2014, Zoo Music)
- "Variations" remix 12" single (2015, Handmade Birds)
- "The Golden Age of Hate" single (2017, Primal Architecture Records)
- Savage Exile album (2017, aufnahme + wiedergabe)
- The Hissing of a Paper Crane album (2019, Primal Architecture Records)
- "Empire Grave" single (2019, Adult Swim)

=== With Vain Warr ===
- Deadline Season EP (2016, Primal Architecture Records)
- "Shadow of the Thresher" (Vain Warr + The Harrow) single (2020, Primal Architecture Records)
- Mausoleum Saturnalia EP (2021, Primal Architecture Records)
- Maleficia Carnalia album (2021, Primal Architecture Records)
- "Sleeping In The Fire" single (2024, Primal Architecture Records)

=== With The Red Window ===
- Afterlife album (2020, Primal Architecture Records)

=== With The Harrow ===
- "Beyond Stars" (2021, Self-released) – Saxophone performance

=== With Meridiane ===
- "Deerstalking" single (2021, Primal Architecture Records)
- To Walk Behind The Sun album (2021, Primal Architecture Records)

=== With Klosterfriedhof ===
- "Cry Havoc Through the Silent Groves" single (2022, Primal Architecture Records)

=== With Desolation Colony ===
- "Desolation Colony" EP (2023, Mannequin Records)
- "Those In The Cities Will Be Devoured" EP (2024, aufnahme + wiedergabe)
- "The World Is An Open Tomb" single (2024, aufnahme + wiedergabe)
