= In Trance 95 =

Greek electronic music group

- In Trance 95 in 1988

Background information
- Origin: Athens, Greece
- Genres: Synthpop, coldwave, electronica
- Years active: 1988–1996; 2010—present
- Labels: Wipe Out Records, Elfish, Undo, Minimal Wave
- Members: Alex A. Machairas; Nik J. Veliotis
- Past members: George Geranios; Magdalena Sverlander

In Trance 95 (also abbreviated to IT95) is a Greek electronic music music duo formed in Athens in 1988 by Alex Machairas and Nik Veliotis. The band is considered a pioneering act in the Greek minimal synth and EBM (electronic body music) scene. Their early analog-driven recordings are associated with the broader minimal wave movement and have received renewed international attention since the 2010s.

== History ==
=== Early years and influences (1988–1992) ===
Machairas and Veliotis met in May 1988 at a performance by Blaine L. Reininger of Tuxedomoon. Both were teenagers already experimenting with synthesizers and drum machines, and shortly after meeting, they began composing and recording together. They established a DIY home studio named Airdawn, where they created a significant volume of early material.

Influences on In Trance 95 include Kraftwerk, Cabaret Voltaire, OMD, SPK, Front 242, Depeche Mode and Coil. Machairas has also cited personal influences such as Serge Gainsbourg, the Human League, John Foxx's Metamatic (1980), and Solid Space's Space Museum (1982).

In late 1988, they released their debut single, the double A-side "Desire to Desire / Brazilia", via Wipe Out Records, followed by the 7-inch single "21st C.E.T." in 1989. The duo began performing live in Athens at a time when the local electronic scene was still in its infancy, often appearing alongside dark wave and post-punk bands. Their debut 7 inch is one of the few known releases of synthpop - cold wave that came from Greece in the '80s.

Their debut album, Code of Obsession (1990), showcased a blend of minimal synth, early EBM, and industrial sounds. In 1991, they released the 12" "Warm Night Driving on Wet Streets", and contributed tracks to compilations on the label Elfish. Veliotis left the group in 1992, and Machairas continued the project with new collaborators until 1996.

=== Hiatus and rediscovery (1997–2009) ===
After the group went on hiatus, Veliotis pursued a solo career as a cellist, while Machairas continued recording under various aliases — among them Weird Shadows, a project he formed with George K. in 1996. Although In Trance 95 ceased releasing music during this period, interest in their early work resurfaced in the late 2000s through online platforms such as YouTube.

In 2009, Veronica Vasicka, founder of the U.S.-based label Minimal Wave, discovered the band's early recordings and contacted Machairas to propose a compilation project. This led to renewed interest in the group’s work internationally.

=== Reunion and first Minimal Wave releases (2010–2015) ===
In 2010, Machairas and Veliotis reunited to perform live in Athens, opening for Recoil (Alan Wilder of Depeche Mode). The same year, Minimal Wave released Cities of Steel and Neon, a compilation of remastered early material and demos. The title references a track originally planned as the title of their first LP in the late 1980s.

Following the reunion, the band resumed live shows and began crafting new material. Their comeback album, Shapes in a New Geometry, was released by Minimal Wave in 2012. They also contributed the track “Presidente,” recorded in 1988, to The Minimal Wave Tapes Vol. 2, a celebrated compilation that spotlighted rare and influential synthwave and cold wave artists.

Starting around 2006, growing underground interest in minimal synth and cold wave—especially in New York and Central Europe—helped revive In Trance 95’s legacy. The rise of the “Minimal Wave” genre brought many overlooked 1980s electronic acts back into the limelight. Several In Trance 95 tracks enjoyed regular rotation on the Minimal Wave radio program broadcast by New York’s East Village Radio.

In 2010, the duo officially signed with Minimal Wave Records. With the label’s support and the involvement of founder Veronica Vasicka, they carefully curated and remastered Cities of Steel and Neon, presenting a definitive collection of their pioneering early work.

In March 2011, In Trance 95 performed live in Athens to celebrate the album’s release, coinciding with Vasicka’s inaugural visit to Greece during a special three-day event honoring 1980s analog synthesizers and DIY tape recorder music.

==== Cities of Steel and Neon ====
Cities Of Steel And Neon album cover designed by Peter Miles Studio, New York 2011.

American independent label Minimal Wave announced on July 20 of 2011, the release of In Trance 95's album Cities of Steel and Neon which came out on October 6 of 2011 as the label's twenty-ninth release. Cities of Steel and Neon features material recorded between 1988-1989: the unreleased 4-track recordings, the highly lauded first single Desire To Desire / Brazilia, and a rare version of 21st Century European Temptation. The LP is pressed on 180 gram black vinyl and housed in a matte sleeve with semi-gloss inner sleeve depicting 1989 video stills of the duo. The sleeve is designed by Peter Miles using an image supplied by the well known New York artist Matthew Bakkom. On December 1 of 2011, Minimal Wave released the digital version of the album with two bonus tracks from 1988, "Gunshot" and "Oslo", that were also previously unreleased.

==== Shapes in a New Geometry ====
In September 2012, Minimal Wave announced the release of Shapes in a New Geometry, an album of entirely new material from In Trance 95. The album first came out as a limited edition cassette on November 14 by the New York based label and included eight tracks, recorded and mixed by Alex Machairas and Nik Veliotis between February and May of the same year. The digital version followed internationally on February 5 of 2013. Since the album's release the duo did a number of live shows including dates in Germany, Belgium, Greece and their first ever gig outside Europe, in Russia on February 22 of 2013.

=== Later activity and international return (2016–present) ===
In 2019, In Trance 95 were prominently featured in Music for Ordinary Life Machines, the acclaimed documentary by Nikos Chantzis that explores the Greek minimal synth and synth punk scene from the 1980s to the present. The film includes a newly recorded interview with both Alex Machairas and Nik Veliotis, alongside rare archival footage of the band from the late 1980s.

Following a brief hiatus from live performances, In Trance 95 returned to the stage in 2023 at Release Athens Festival, supporting Siouxsie and Echo & The Bunnymen. In 2024 and 2025, the band performed at Ombra Festival in Barcelona, multiple venues in Greece, and made their North American debut at Minimal Wave’s 20th Anniversary event in New York City, followed by a concert in Montreal.

In 2025, the group released the six-track EP The Move on Minimal Wave. A remix 12-inch is scheduled for release on Cititrax label, featuring reworks by Sandwell District and Phase Fatale. In the same year, the duo began working on new material planned for release in 2026. Minimal Wave also announced the reissue of the group’s complete back catalogue, along with additional archival material.

== Discography ==
=== Singles ===
- Desire To Desire / Brazilia (Wipe Out 7" WOR-013 15/12/1988)
- 21st Century European Temptation (Wipe Out 7" WOR-016 12/06/1989)
- Warm Nights Driving On Wet Streets (Elfish 12" elf-002 10/09/1991)
- Wave (Airdawn Music 7" AirDR11 15/11/2015)
- The Move (Minimal Wave 12" 6-track E.P. - MW083 27/05/2025)

=== Albums ===
- Code Of Obsession (Wipe Out LP WOR-029 09/07/1990)
- Cities Of Steel And Neon (Minimal Wave LP & Digital with two bonus tracks MW-029 06/10/2011 & 01/12/2011)
- Shapes In A New Geometry (Minimal Wave Chrome Cassette & Digital MW043 14/11/2012 & 05/02/2013)

=== Compilations ===
- Random Relations Vol.1 (Elfish LP elf-004 1992)
- Crash - A Tribute to JG Ballard (Elfish CD elf-013 1993)
- Minimal Wave Tapes Vol.2 (Minimal Wave / Stones Throw double LP, CD & Digital STH2281 29/02/2012)

=== EPs ===
- Ocean (Indivisible CD IDV-01 1995)
- Overcast (Indivisible CD IDV-03 1995)

=== Remixes ===
- OMD - If You Want It (IT95 remix) available on OMD's album History of Modern (German digital edition 2010 / Greece Undo records CDUN25B 2011)
- HNN - Renouveau Ordinaire (In Trance 95 remix) from "Pièce Radiophonique remixes" album (Autumn 2012)
