= Naktis =

1987 album by Dzeltenie Pastnieki

Studio album by Dzeltenie Pastnieki
- Released: 1987
- Recorded: January–August 1987, at "Incognito" studio, Rīga
- Genre: Synthpop, new wave, post-punk
- Length: 45:34
- Label: magnitizdat, Ingus Baušķenieka ieraksti
- Producer: Ingus Baušķenieks

Dzeltenie Pastnieki chronology
Depresīvā pilsēta (1986)	Naktis (1987)	Sliekutēva vaļasprieks (1989)

Naktis is the sixth album by Latvian band Dzeltenie Pastnieki, released through magnitizdat in 1987, and was the last one of the band's six 1980s albums to see an official CD release. Before the October 21, 2010 issue, the album was widely shared on P2P networks in several versions of tape-to-computer transfers done by fans. The name of the album translates as "Nights" or "The Nights" from Latvian, referring to the hours the sessions most often took place.

As a favourite of both fans and critics alike, the album is perhaps the band's strongest full-length statement. So far, it is the only album besides Bolderājas dzelzceļš to feature live drumming by Ilgvars Rišķis, and marked a return to that album's guitar/bass-centered sound. Both synthesizers and tape manipulation were also still prominent in the band's sound.

== Track listing ==
Written by Ingus Baušķenieks/Ilgvars Rišķis/Viesturs Slava/Zigmunds Streiķis, except where noted.

1. "Noguris un nelaimīgs" (Baušķenieks/Rišķis/Streiķis) — 3:55
2. "Lāstekas" — 4:30
3. "Spogulis" — 4:30
4. "Skola" — 4:50
5. "Putni un lietus" (Slava/Roberts Gobziņš) — 5:00
6. "Rēta dvēselē" — 5:35
7. "Pavasaris (ir grūts laiks)" — 4:55
8. "Man nav neviena, kam to teikt" — 4:00
9. "Jaunais gads" — 4:50
10. "Serenāde (Tev nesāpēs sirds)" (Baušķenieks) — 4:15

== Credits ==
- Band – Ingus Baušķenieks, Ilgvars Rišķis, Viesturs Slava, Zigmunds Streiķis
- Artwork – Ingus Baušķenieks
- Design – Lindes Jaunkundze

== Release history ==
Region	Date	Label	Format	Catalog	Ref.
Latvia	October 21, 2010	Ingus Baušķenieka ieraksti	CD	IBCD 207	
Latvia	2010	Ingus Baušķenieka ieraksti	digital download (MP3)	–	
Latvia	May 8, 2016	Ingus Baušķenieka ieraksti	digital download (MP3, FLAC, etc.)	–	
