= Mēness dejas =

1995 album by Dzeltenie Pastnieki

Remix album by Dzeltenie Pastnieki
- Released: December 1, 1995
- Recorded: Dates not specified (Down in the Park Studio, Rīgas Skaņu Ierakstu Studija)
- Genre: Synthpop
- Length: 47:53
- Label: MicRec
- Producer: Uģis Vītiņš, Ģirts Bišs

Dzeltenie Pastnieki chronology
Sliekutēva vaļasprieks (1989)	Mēness dejas (1995)	Kaķis (2003)

Mēness dejas is a 1995 album containing eight songs by Latvian band Dzeltenie Pastnieki as reinterpreted by Uģis Vītiņš. Originally found on four of the band's 1980s album releases, the songs have been re-arranged radically, and have had all the vocals re-recorded by the original vocalists.

Mēness dejas is notable as the band's first release on CD, and was done to meet the popular demand for a CD compilation of the band's hits. Thus, its concept could be compared to stopgap quasi-compilation releases from other synthpop artists like Kraftwerk's The Mix (1991) and Yello's 1980–1985 The New Mix in One Go (1986), both of which likewise contained newly recorded versions of previously released material.

Uģis Vītiņš went on to appear on the band's next album, Kaķis (2003) as well as played on Ingus Baušķenieks's solo tour (2004–2005). His brother Toms Vītiņš, who played bass and designed the cover, later also did the cover for the CD release of the album Alise.

== Track listing ==
=== Side one ===
1. "Pastnieks trakais" – 5:52
2. "Mēness deja" – 6:20
3. "Kāpēc tu mani negribi" – 6:20
4. "Rudens pastaiga (Rudens limits)" – 6:07

=== Side two ===
1. "Svešā malā" (Svētki Rojā mix) – 6:32
2. "Mana vasara aiziet (kā vēlējies)" – 6:17
3. "Milžu cīņa" – 5:30
4. "Jaunais gads" – 4:55

== Credits ==
- Uģis Vītiņš - arrangements, programming, saxophone, management, production
- Ģirts Bišs - additional arrangements, programming
- Toms Vītiņš - bass arrangements, bass guitar, photography, artwork
- Arnolds Kārklis - guitar arrangements, electric & acoustic guitars, second voice on track 8
- Ingus Baušķenieks - voice on tracks 1, 4, 6, 7 & 8
- Edīte Baušķeniece - voice on track 3
- Viesturs Slava - voice on tracks 2, 3 & 5
- Gatis Krūmiņš - trumpet
- Nils Īle - congas on tracks 4 & 7
- Tālis Timrots - recording and mix engineering

== Release history ==
Region	Date	Label	Format	Catalog	Ref.
Latvia	December 1, 1995	Mikrofona ieraksti	CD	MRCD 047	
Latvia	December 1, 1995	Mikrofona ieraksti	cassette	MRCC 158	
Latvia	January 2007	Mikrofona ieraksti	digital download	–	
