= Alise (album) =

1984 album by Dzeltenie Pastnieki

Studio album by Dzeltenie Pastnieki
- Released: 1984
- Recorded: December 1983 – June 1984 ("Oktobris", "Pie Lielās Omas")
- Genres: Synthpop, new wave, post-punk
- Length: 44:56
- Label: Ingus Baušķenieka ieraksti
- Producer: Ingus Baušķenieks

Dzeltenie Pastnieki chronology
| Man ļoti patīk jaunais vilnis (1982) | Alise (1984) | Vienmēr klusi (1984) |

Alise is the third album by Latvian band Dzeltenie Pastnieki, released through magnitizdat in 1984, and 'officially' as late as 2004.

The album was based on the music the band recorded for an amateur stage adaptation of Lewis Carroll's Alice's Adventures in Wonderland (1865) and Through the Looking-Glass (1871), directed by Andris Zeibots. All the lyrics are from the two books, as translated by Dagnija Dreika-Matule and Zeibots.

Album closer "Gaisa balona dzinēja" is an instrumental version of the 1980 Raimonds Pauls/Vizma Belševica song "Kamolā tinēja", which was originally performed by Imants Skrastiņš. The Dzeltenie Pastnieki version was heavily influenced by Trio, particularly the song "Turaluraluralu".

Outtakes from this album's sessions eventually formed the basis for the next album, Vienmēr klusi, while directly related tracks on later albums include "Alise un runcis" (on Vienmēr klusi), "Brīnišķā zupa" (on Depresīvā pilsēta), "Hercogienes dziesma (instrumental)" and studio chatter titled "Cik zaļas acis zutim" (on Sliekutēva vaļasprieks). A short instrumental reprise of "Vakara zupa" was included on the band's 2003 comeback album Kaķis.

The track "Omāru kadriļļa" is considered the best example of Baušķenieks' tape editing labours, as it was reportedly edited out of 45 minutes of recorded material, with the resulting track lasting just under 5 minutes.

== Track listing ==
All songs written by Ingus Baušķenieks/Andris Kalniņš/Mārtiņš Rutkis/Viesturs Slava/Zigmunds Streiķis/Lewis Carroll except where noted.

1. "Džabervokijs" (Jabberwocky)
2. "Peles dziesma" (Mouse song)
3. "Hercogienes dziesma" (Duchess song)
4. "Vakara zupa" (Soup of the Evening)
5. "Viļņa valsis" (Wave waltz) (Baušķenieks/Kalniņš/Rutkis/Slava/Streiķis)
6. "Trīsi, trīsi, sikspārnīt..." (Twinkle, twinkle, little Bat!)
7. "Dziesma par kroketa spēlēšanu" (Song of the croquet lovers)
8. "Omāru kadriļa" (The Lobster Quadrille)
9. "Apsūdzības dziesma" (Accusation Song)
10. "Gaisa balona dzinēja" (Raimonds Pauls)

== Credits ==
- Graphics – Toms Vītiņš
- Special thanks to Mārtiņš Saulespurēns, Mārtiņš Brauns and Harijs Bašs

== Release history ==
| Region | Date | Label | Format | Catalog | Ref. |
|---|---|---|---|---|---|
| Latvia | April 30, 2004 | Ingus Baušķenieka ieraksti | CD | IBCD 203 | |
| Latvia | August 2007 | Ingus Baušķenieka ieraksti | digital download (MP3) | – | |
| Latvia | April 12, 2016 | Ingus Baušķenieka ieraksti | digital download (MP3, FLAC, etc.) | – | |
