= Solid Space =

British minimal wave band

- Origin: United Kingdom
- Genres: Minimal wave, minimal synth, synthpop, post-punk
- Years active: 1980–1982
- Label: In Phaze
- Spinoff of: Exhibit A
- Past members: Dan Goldstein; Maf Vosburgh

Solid Space was a short-lived British minimal wave band, formed in 1980 by Matthew 'Maf' Vosburgh and Dan Goldstein. Vosburgh and Goldstein, who met at age 11, were previously involved in 1970s new wave band Exhibit A and formed a record label, Irrelevant Wombat Records, at age 14. The band's music and lyrics were heavily indebted to science fiction, in particular the television series Doctor Who.

The band spent the next couple of years after their formation recording, with contributions from Jonathan "Jon Winegum" Weinreich. The band's only release that featured all of their material, titled Space Museum, was released on cassette in 1982 through In Phaze Records. Following its release, Solid Space disbanded and their members drifted into obscurity.

Despite staying underground, the band was influential in the development of minimal wave and other related electronic music genres, influencing acts such as In Trance 95.

Following the dissolution of the band, Dan Goldstein pursued a career in journalism, which included a stint as editor of Maplin's Electronics & Music Maker magazine, whilst Maf Vosburgh studied photography and became a photographer for music magazines, before later moving on to work as a software engineer for Apple and Google. Both members are currently based in the United States. In 2017, under the supervision and approval of Solid Space, Space Museum was remastered onto vinyl by indie label Dark Entries.

== Band members ==
- Dan Goldstein - vocals, keyboards
- Matthew "Maf" Vosburgh - vocals, guitar, bass, keyboards (son of writer Dick Vosburgh, brother of actress Tilly Vosburgh)

== Discography ==
Releases

- Space Museum (1982)

Appearances

- RA.210 (2010)
