= Covered in Dust =

Covered In Dust

Studio album by Kindest Lines
- Released: June 20, 2011
- Genre: New wave, coldwave
- Length: 41:23
- Label: Wierd Records

Covered In Dust is the first album by the American new wave band Kindest Lines, released in 2011 on Wierd Records.

== Track listing ==
1. "Hazy Haze" – 3:19
2. "Destructive Paths To Live Happily" – 4:16
3. "Baltimore" – 3:44
4. "Strange Birds" – 4:23
5. "Dark Dream" – 3:22
6. "Running Into Next Year" – 3:49
7. "No Perfect Focus" – 4:25
8. "Record Party" – 3:39
9. "In Death Not to Part" – 3:22
10. "Prom Song" – 3:55
11. "Colors Treasured" – 3:15

== Reception ==
Professional ratings
Review scores
| Source | Rating |
|---|---|
| Drowned In Sound | 8/10 stars |
| The Quietus | (favorable) |
| AU Magazine | 7/10 stars |

While several reviews noted the album's similarities to 1980s British New Wave bands like The Cure, the overall initial critical response was relatively positive, with Dom Gourlay of Drowned In Sound calling it "measured and inspired from beginning to end".
