= Space Museum =

Space Museum may refer to:

- Hong Kong Space Museum
- National Air and Space Museum, Washington, D.C., United States
- Planetarium, a place for exhibiting images of astronomical phenomena
- The Space Museum, a serial of the British television program Doctor Who
- Space Museum, a DC Comics science-fiction series
- Space Museum (album), by Solid Space
