= Par Avion =

Par avion is a French term meaning "by air" often used on airmail etiquettes

Par Avion may also refer to:

- Par Avion (airline), Australian airline
- Par Avion (Lost), TV series episode
- Par Avion (band), a band from the United States
- Par Avion (album), a 2014 studio album by Xeno & Oaklander
- Par Avion (EP), a 2009 EP by High Flight Society
- "Par Avion", song by Mike + the Mechanics from Mike + The Mechanics (1985 album)
