= Midnight of the Century =

Studio album by Blacklist
- Released: May 26, 2009
- Recorded: Mavericks, New York City
- Genre: Post-punk revival
- Length: 46:53
- Label: Wierd Records
- Producer: Ed Buller

Professional ratings
Review scores
Source	Rating
PopMatters	(7/10)
NME	(6/10)
The Big Takeover	(favorable)
In Tune (The Daily News (McKeesport)	4/5 stars
True/Slant	(4.2/5)
Fazer Magazine	(favorable)

Midnight of the Century is the debut album by Brooklyn band Blacklist. It was released in 2009 on independent record label Wierd Records. The title is a reference to a book by Victor Serge.

== Themes and references ==
The song "Shock in the Hotel Falcon" was inspired by George Orwell's Homage to Catalonia. "Language of the Living Dead" references the work of Slovenian philosopher Slavoj Žižek. The album's liner notes open with the phrase "Fiat justitia ruat caelum" and contain quotes from Jacques Lacan, Don DeLillo, Rumi and Salman Rushdie.

In terms of how this functions with the music, Blacklist's singer/lyricist Joshua Strawn said:

...if you want to read my lyrics for the subtexts and hear us as a political band, you can certainly do that and you can practically get a reading list from our songs (Ibn Rushd, Omar Khayyam, George Orwell, Victor Serge, Arjun Appadurai, Ramin Jahanbegloo, Salman Rushdie, Slavoj Žižek, just to give you the short list). But if you just like the music, that works too. You don't have to know who Akbar Ganji and Zakia Zaki are to appreciate 'When Worlds Collide' by us [...] it is form or melody that succeeds first--if the more thought out ideas and agendas work too, they are only able to do so because the rest is already in place and one's appreciation of one shouldn't condition too much your ability to appreciate the other.

== Track listing ==
All tracks written by Blacklist.

1. "Still Changes" – 3:59
2. "Flight of the Demoiselles" – 4:19
3. "Shock in the Hotel Falcon" – 4:44
4. "Language of the Living Dead" – 4:33
5. "Odessa" – 4:39
6. "Julie Speaks" – 4:32
7. "Poison for Tomorrow" – 3:23
8. "Frontiers" – 4:11
9. "The Cunning of History" – 3:03
10. "When Worlds Collide" – 4:34
11. "The Believer" – 4:56
