= Sliekutēva vaļasprieks =

1989 album by Dzeltenie Pastnieki

Compilation album by Dzeltenie Pastnieki
- Released: 1989
- Recorded: 1981–1987
- Genres: Synthpop, new wave, post-punk
- Label: Not specified on release packaging

Dzeltenie Pastnieki chronology
Naktis (1987)	Sliekutēva vaļasprieks (1989)	Mēness dejas (1995)

Sliekutēva vaļasprieks is the first compilation album by Latvian band Dzeltenie Pastnieki, released on quarter-inch tape and compact cassette in 1989. Oddly, neither a label nor a catalog number is specified anywhere on the sleeve.

The release is notable for the inclusion of a non-album track, "Karuselis upes vidū", originating from the sessions for Man ļoti patīk jaunais vilnis (1982), and two out-takes from the sessions for Alise (1984) - studio dialogue entitled "Cik zaļas acis zutim" and an instrumental mix of "Hercogienes dziesma".

The album additionally boasts the most exquisite packaging among the band's official releases, featuring a close-up of a bass guitar on the back, portrait photographs of the band members on the inner sleeve, plus a leaflet with track details inside.

== Track listing ==
=== Side A ===
1. "Viltus pastnieks dzeltenais" (edit)
2. "Čemodāns"
3. "Nāc ārā no ūdens"
4. "Bezcerīgā dziesma"
5. "Kāpēc tu mani negribi"
6. "Mana vasara aiziet"
7. "Man ļoti patīk jaunais vilnis"
8. "Peles dziesma"
9. "Kroketa dziesma"
10. "Cik zaļas acis zutim" (studio dialogue)
11. "Hercogienes dziesma" (instrumental)

=== Side B ===
1. "Karuselis upes vidū"
2. "Vienmēr klusi"
3. "Svešā malā"
4. "Sliekutēva vaļasprieks"
5. "Milžu cīņa"
6. "Nevaru saprast tā neko"
7. "Mākoņu sniegs"
8. "Pavasaris (ir grūts laiks)"
9. "Jaunais gads"
10. "Noguris un nelaimīgs"
