= Nikos Veliotis =

Greek musician, composer, and cellist

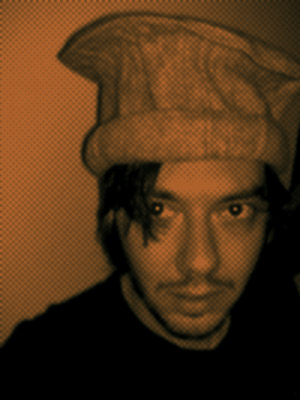
Nikos Veliotis

Nikos Veliotis (born 26 February 1970 in Athens, Greece) is a Greek musician, composer and cellist.

== Biography ==
Nikos Veliotis initially studied classical piano until the age of 16. He became involved in the Athens underground electronic music scene and founded In Trance 95 together with Alex Machairas in 1988. He took up the cello at the age of 21. By the end of the 90s he was totally devoted to the experimental field in both sound and image, performing solo or in regular groups. During the early 2000s he started a collaboration with fellow Greek musician Giannis Aggelakas with whom they released two albums to date.

In 2008 he founded Mohammad (also going by the MMMD moniker) together with ILIOS Coti K. On 21 March 2009 he turned his cello into powder during a live performance with the title ‘Cello Powder [The Complete Works for Cello]’ at the Install Festival in Glasgow, U.K. He is the owner of a curved bow (BACH.Bogen n° 19). He has composed music for dance, theatre and films. From 2000 to 2007 Veliotis organised the 2:13 festival of experimental music in Athens, Greece.

== Selected discography ==
=== Solo ===
- β (2001), Confront Recordings
- Radial (2004), Confront Recordings
- Folklor Invalid (2013), Antifrost With Giannis Aggelakas

=== Collaborations ===
- 28/04/2001 (2001), absurd, with Costis Drygianakis
- VW (2002), absurd, with Dan Warburton
- Quartet (2004), Hibari Music, with Taku Sugimoto, Kazushige Kinoshita, Taku Unami
- The Harmless Dust (2005), Vectors, Headz, with David Grubbs
- Οι Ανάσες Των Λύκων (2005), Alltogethernow, EMI
- Πότε Θα Φτάσουμε Εδώ (2007), Alltogethernow, EMI
- Slugabed (2010), Hibari Music, with Klaus Filip
- Caspian Black (2015), Alt.Vinyl, with Xavier Charles

=== Groups ===
- In Trance 95 (with Alex Machairas)
- Cranc (with Rhodri Davies & Angharad Davies)
- Looper (with Ingar Zach & Martin Kuchen)
- MMMD / Mohammad (with ILIOS & Coti K.) / MMMD (with ILIOS)

== Compositions ==
- V (2002) based on violin & cello recordings
- qpdbqp (2002) for 6 musicians (piano, saxophone, clarinet, harp, cello & electronics)
- aceghd (2004) for string quartet (violin, cello, guitar & contra guitar)
- FULL (2003) for cello overdubs
- Mugs on Speed (2008) for 9 Mugs on Marble
- 4D for (2008) 0 ensemble

== Compositions for Cello with Curved Bow ==
- Haris Kittos - ÁTROPO 2002
- Reynaldo Young - earlier person under the train 2002
- Dimitris Kamarotos - 85:03:03 2002
- Michalis Adamis - ANELIGMA 2002
- Daryl Runswick - SONATA ('Gracing') 2002
- Dai Fujikura - Secret Breath 2001

== Intermedia ==
- Vomvos 2003, for cello and video
- Cello Powder [The Complete Works for Cello] 2009, multimedia performance for pre-recorded cello, video and live action
