= Futurisk =

American electropunk group

- Origin: Lighthouse Point, Florida, United States
- Genres: Synth-pop, electropunk, minimal wave, new wave
- Years active: 1979–1984
- Labels: Clark Humphrey Records, Minimal Wave Records, Cititrax Records
- Past members: Jeremy Kolosine; Richard Hess; Jack Howard; Frank Lardino; Vinny Scrimenti; Jeff Marcus
- Website: minimalwave.futurisk.net

Futurisk - Player Piano EP (1982) Clark Humphrey Records Art by Frank Vickers

Futurisk (stylized as FUTURISK) was an American electronic electropunk group based out of Lighthouse Point, Florida, United States that recorded and performed live in the late 1970s and early 1980s in South Florida, and are believed to be the first electropop/electropunk band in the American South.

They initially had two 7" vinyl releases on Clark Humphrey Records: The Sound of Futurism 1980/Army Now (1980) and Player Piano EP (1982), the latter of which was rediscovered in 2002 by LCD Soundsystem frontman and DFA Records co-founder/producer James Murphy when he happened across it in a NYC record store. Murphy subsequently released a Futurisk track, Push Me Pull You, Part 2 on a DFA mix CD through the Paris fashion-house Colette in 2003, titled Colette No. 5, sparking a renewed interest in Futurisk's music.

In 2010, the New York City-based label Minimal Wave released a 30th anniversary retrospective full length vinyl of Futurisk's works titled Player Piano LP and received positive reviews in the press. On May 17, 2011, Minimal Wave/Cititrax Records released the Lonely Streets Remixes 12" EP which includes remixes by artists such as Chris Carter (a founding member of the bands Throbbing Gristle and Chris & Cosey), Tom Furse (a founding member of the band The Horrors), Complexxion, and Prince Language (DFA Records).

Futurisk was founded by British expatriate Jeremy Kolosine who in 2007 executive produced the album 8-Bit Operators: The Music of Kraftwerk on Kraftwerk's US homelabel Astralwerks and EMI Records worldwide, for which Kraftwerk founding member Ralf Hütter personally selected the tracks.

== Band members ==
- Jeremy Kolosine - vocals, synthesizer, sequencer, vocoder, guitar-synth, drum-machine, bass guitar, electric mandolin (1979–1984).
- Richard Hess - synthesizer, drum-machine, sequencer, vocoder (1981–1984).
- Jack Howard - drums, syndrums (1980–1984).
- Vinny Scrimenti - drums (1981-1982).
- Jeff Marcus - bass (1980-1982).
- Frank Lardino - synthesizer (1980–1981).
