= Xeno & Oaklander =

American electronic music group

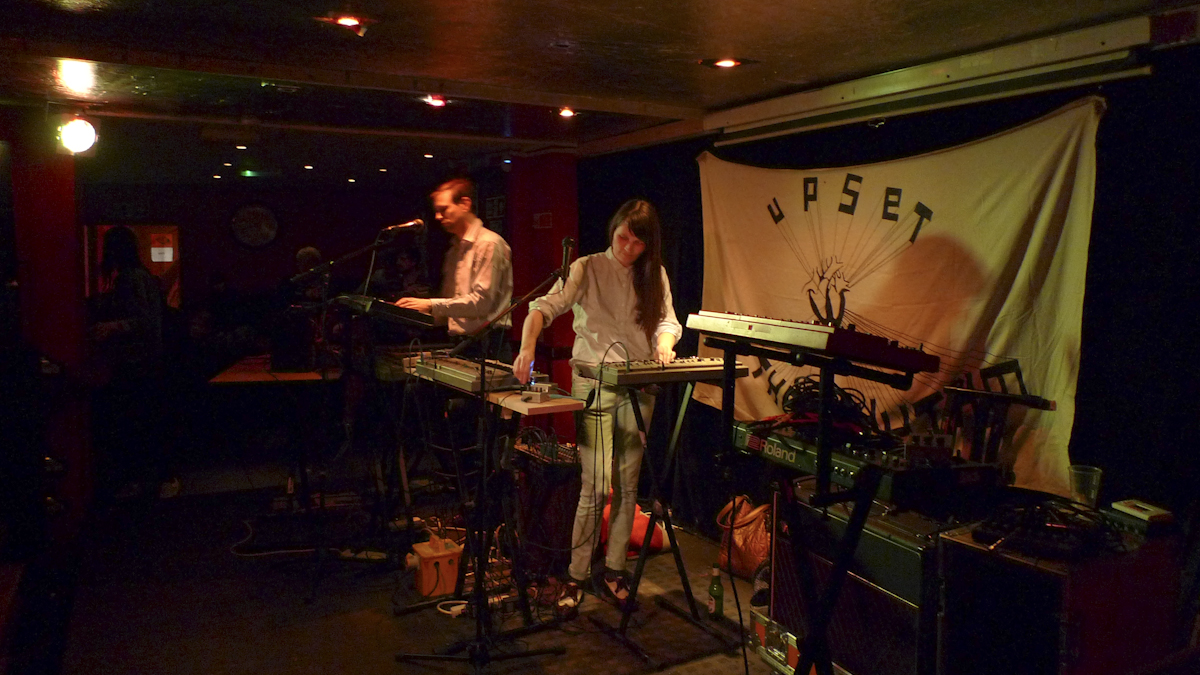
- Xeno & Oaklander in 2010

Background information
- Also known as: Xeno and Oaklander
- Origin: Brooklyn, New York
- Genres: Minimal synth; synth-pop; cold wave; dark wave
- Years active: 2004–present
- Labels: Xanten; Wierd; Ghostly International; Electric Voice; Girouette; Dais
- Members: Sean McBride; Liz Wendelbo
- Website: xenoandoaklander.bandcamp.com

Xeno & Oaklander is an American electronic music group formed in 2004, consisting of musicians Sean McBride and Liz Wendelbo. Originating from Brooklyn, the band is considered to be among the cold wave revival scene of the 2000s and 2010s.

== History ==
Maryland-native Sean McBride and French-Norwegian conceptual artist Liz Wendelbo met in 2003; the former was involved in solo projects such as Moravagine and Martial Canterel, which were based on modular synthesizers, sequencers and drum machines. The duo started recording music in an abandoned factory building near the East River; its debut album, Vigils, recorded in a single take, was released in 2006. The band then signed to Wierd Records, which released 2009's Sentinelle. Following its 2011 record Sets & Lights, which was also released on Wierd and showcased elements from darkwave, Italo disco and techno, the duo issued the single "Sheen" for Electric Voice and collaborated with Fabian Marti, composing a soundtrack for the Swiss artist.

Xeno & Oaklander signed to Ghostly International for 2014's Par Avion, which featured Serge synthesizer and was inspired by synesthesia. Sessions for Par Avion produced 2015's Movements, a 35-piece commissioned by National Center for the Arts, Grenoble and Ecole du Magasin. Following 2016's Topiary on Ghostly International, the duo released Movements II, which was only available on their tour that May; in October, the bossa nova-tinged single "Moonlight" appeared on a split 7-inch released by the UK magazine Electronic Sound. Shortly thereafter the duo signed to Dais Records, which issued the album Hypnos in 2019.

== Musical style ==
Labeled as a minimal synth, synth-pop and darkwave act, Xeno & Oaklander is considered to be among the key acts that revive and update the sounds of 70s and 80s' cold wave and minimal electronic bands, combining "crisp analog synths with poetic songwriting and vocals." Pitchfork critic Larry Fitzmaurice has described the band's cold wave-inspired music as "deadpan D.I.Y. post-punk filtered through brutal drum machines and synth lines so brittle and thin you could practically snap them over your knee." Preferring to use analog gear and no post-processing, the band used monophonic synthesizers during the Topiary era, while Hypnos signalled the reintroduction of polyphonic synthesizers and Wendelbo taking on sole vocal duties.

== Discography ==
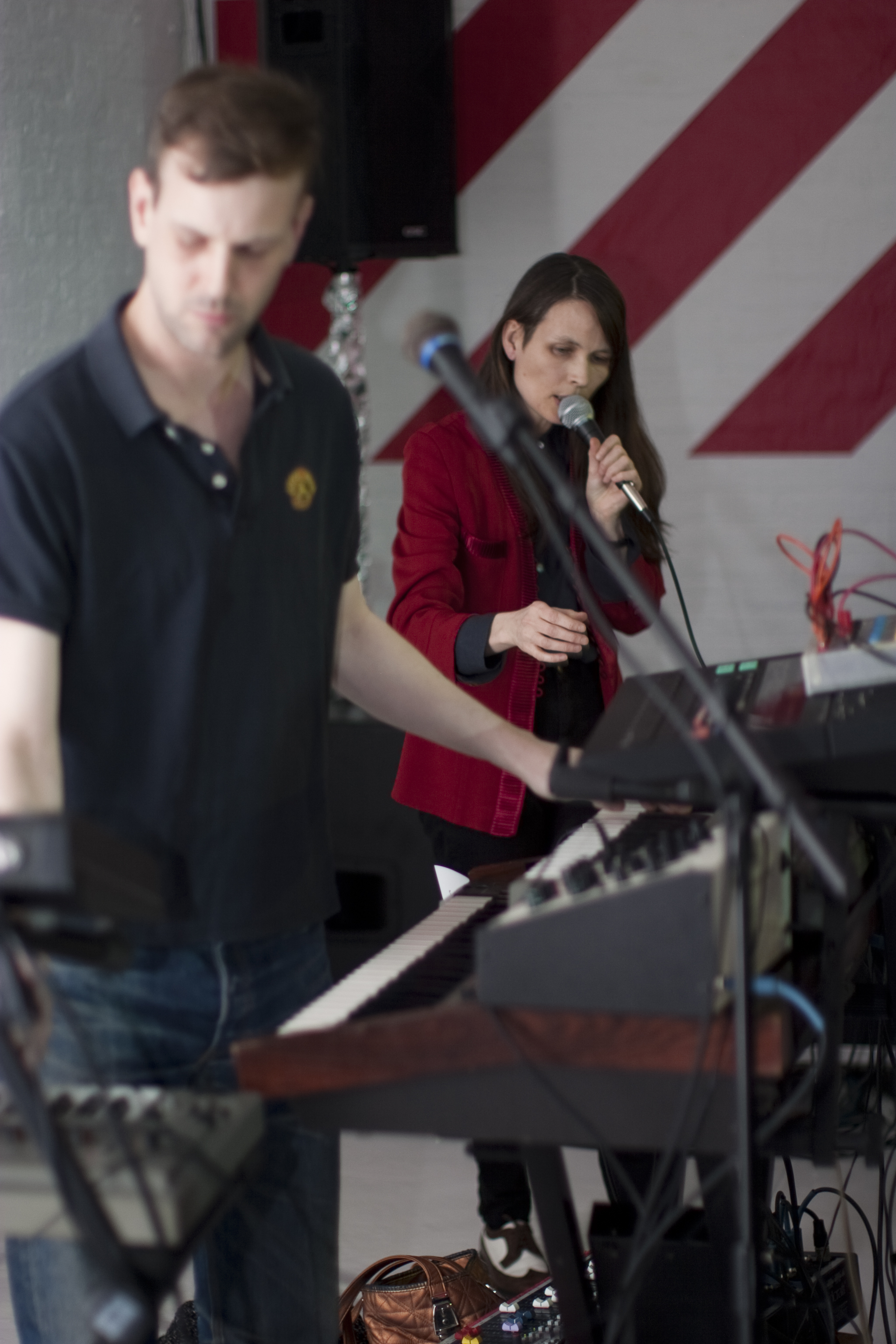
Xeno & Oaklander performing live in 2011

Studio albums

- Vigils (2006)
- Sentinelle (2009)
- Sets & Lights (2011)
- Par Avion (2014)
- Topiary (2016)
- Movements II (2017)
- Hypnos (2019)
- Vi/deo (2021)
- Via Negativa (in the doorway light) (2024)

EPs

- Exposition 3 (2015; split with Philippe Laurent)
- Movements (2015)

Singles

- "Saracen" (2009)
- "Sets & Lights" (2011)
- "The Staircase" (2011)
- "Par Avion" (2013)
- "Sheen" (2013)
- "Interface" (2014)
- "Marble" (2016)
- "Moonlight" (2017)
- "Angélique" (2019)
