= Kindest Lines =

American new wave band

- Origin: New Orleans, Louisiana, USA
- Genres: New wave, coldwave
- Years active: 2010–present
- Labels: Wierd Records
- Members: Brittany Terry; Jack Champagne; Justin Blaire Vial
- Website: Myspace Page

Kindest Lines are a new wave group from New Orleans, Louisiana. The band is made up of vocalist and keyboardist Brittany Terry, guitarist Jack Champagne, keyboardist and drum programmer Justin Blaire Vial.

== History ==
After signing to New York City-based Wierd Records at the end of 2010, Kindest Lines were featured on MP3 blog stereogum as one of "18 Dark Bands To Watch In 2011". Prior to the release of their debut album, the single "Destructive Paths To Live Happily" made its premiere on United States-based music and culture magazine The Fader, with its subsequent video premiere on Stereogum and British magazine FACT.

On June 20, 2011, Kindest Lines released their debut album Covered In Dust on Wierd Records. Following a US tour supporting Xiu Xiu in 2011, Justin Blaire Vial formed the side project Pretty Bleak with Jesse Kees, and Jack Champagne began work on his solo project Direct Attack.

== Discography ==
- Covered In Dust (2011)
