= Dzeltenie Pastnieki =

Latvian musical group

- Dzeltenie Pastnieki live in 2006. From left: Viesturs Slava, Ilgvars Rišķis, Ingus Baušķenieks.

Background information
- Origin: Latvia
- Genres: Synthpop, new wave, post-punk
- Years active: 1979–1987, 1989, 2002-present
- Labels: IB Ieraksti; Mikrofona Ieraksti
- Members: Ingus Baušķenieks; Viesturs Slava; Uģis Vītiņš
- Past members: Roberts Gobziņš; Andris Kalniņš; Mārtiņš Rutkis; Ilgvars Rišķis; Zigmunds Streiķis; Fabiass Nils Sējāns-Īle
- Website: http://www.draugiem.lv/dzelteniepastnieki

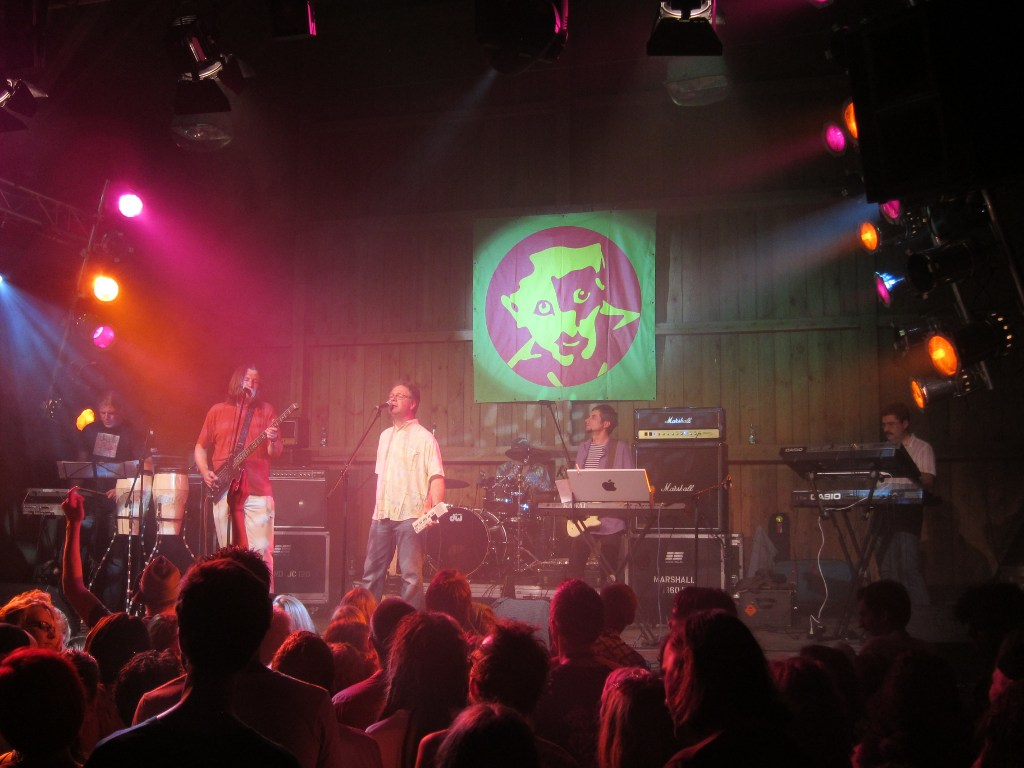
Dzeltenie pastnieki performing in LabaDaba festival in 2012 in Latvia

Dzeltenie Pastnieki are a Latvian band formed in 1979 in Riga, Latvia. Their name means "the yellow postmen" in Latvian, and is sometimes abbreviated to DzP. They were among the pioneers of new wave as well as reggae in the former Soviet Union. The music has ranged from guitar/bass/drums-based post-punk to minimal synthpop to experimental tape manipulation.

The constant core members of the band have remained Ingus Baušķenieks (bass, keyboards, vocals) and Viesturs Slava (guitar, keyboards, vocals), with Zigmunds Streiķis (keyboards) and Ilgvars Rišķis (drums) completing the "classic" line-up. Members of the band, past and present, include alumni of the school currently known as Riga State Gymnasium No.1 (formerly Leons Paegle Riga Secondary School No.1): Ingus Baušķenieks, Viesturs Slava, Andris Kalniņš (all 1974), and Mārtiņš Rutkis (1975).

Their first six albums (1981–1987) were home-recorded using consumer tape recorders, and distributed by means of magnitizdat, on 1/4" reel-to-reel tape and compact cassette, with no artwork. Despite popular demand throughout the 1990s, none of these albums was released properly until 2003, when Baušķenieks began issuing them on compact disc on his own label, IB Ieraksti.

Contemporary Latvian composer Mārtiņš Brauns has said that Dzeltenie Pastnieki influenced the entire Latvian scene, including himself, and even Raimonds Pauls. The band's work of the 1980s has often been praised by leading Russian music critic Artemy Troitsky. Also, DzP were the only Latvian-language artists featured in Alexander Kushnir's book 100 магнитоальбомов советского рока (1999, "100 Tape Albums of Soviet Rock"), with dedicated chapters for two of their albums - Bolderājas dzelzceļš (1981) and Alise (1984).

== History ==
The earliest incarnations of Dzeltenie Pastnieki were formed in the mid 1970s around Baušķenieks, and it is said that the band's early days were spent performing at dance events, playing covers of songs by Gary Numan, Bob Marley, Blondie, and The Police, among others. In the spring of 1981, while under an early name, Jaunais Sarkanais Karalis ("The New Red King", in reference to King Crimson), the band recorded a half-hour-long demo album entitled Madonas galerts (The Meat-Jelly of Madona). Photographs from the recording session show the band at this point consisting of Baušķenieks, Slava, Andris Kalniņš (keyboards, saxophone), and Mārtiņš Rutkis (guitar).

Songs from Madonas galerts were re-recorded later the same year for the proper Dzeltenie Pastnieki debut album, Bolderājas dzelzceļš (The Railroad of Bolderāja; usually misspelt as Bolderājas dzelzsceļš, even on the 2003 CD release). A majority of songs on it were written or co-written by NSRD core members Hardijs Lediņš and Juris Boiko, and date back to material recorded earlier by Seque - a pre-electronic version of NSRD and also the name of their record label. Additionally, it was Lediņs who named the band, after an early song, "Dzeltenais viltus pastnieks" ("The Sham Yellow Postman").

For their second album, Man ļoti patīk jaunais vilnis (1982, I Really Like New Wave), Dzeltenie Pastnieki added Roberts Gobziņš (vocals, lyrics), whom Streiķis had met at a choir rehearsal, and partially gave up the guitar/bass/drums setup for a more synthetic sound. The album boasts the first-ever Latvian-language rap performance (by Gobziņš) in the song "Bezcerīgā dziesma" ("The Hopeless Song").

Following a period of inactivity, the band were asked to compose the music for an amateur stage adaptation of Lewis Carroll's Alice's Adventures in Wonderland and Through the Looking-Glass, directed by Andris Zeibots. However, according to Baušķenieks' recollection, there was only ever a single performance of the play. The resulting album, 1984's Alise (Alice) adopted a considerably more minimal electronic sound, largely due to its modest recording circumstances.

Leftovers from Alise as well as even earlier sessions formed the basis for the fourth album, Vienmēr klusi (also 1984, Always Quiet). Perhaps the band's most stylistically diverse work to date, it demonstrates both their guitar-based and electronic inclinations, and contains their populist calling card, "Milžu cīņa".

Depresīvā pilsēta (1986, The Depressing City) was assembled of out-takes, alternate versions, and even several proper solo tracks by individual members of the band.

Naktis (1987, Nights) could be seen as a 'back to the roots' effort that at the same time made use of the progress of home studio trickery made by Baušķenieks over the previous years. His ever-increasing dominance in the collective also reached its peak on this album, and was most obvious in that Naktis contained only one song with Viesturs Slava on lead vocals (who had sung around half of the tracks on each prior album). Nevertheless, Naktis has had the best overall reaction from both critics and fans.

In 1988 Bauškenieks released his first solo album Mājas dzīve (Life at Home). He claimed that by 1988 he had amassed enough equipment to be able to work without a full band. However, the lineup of Baušķenieks, Slava, Streiķis and Rišķis reunited and went on a national tour with K. Remonts in 1989.

As a solo artist, Roberts Gobziņš became a national star of the 1990s. He released the first Latvian-language rap 12" single Aka Aka on Westbam's Low Spirit label, and later signed a five-album deal with MicRec (now called Mikrofona Ieraksti and representing EMI and Sony BMG).

The only new Dzeltenie Pastnieki release in the 1990s was Mēness dejas (1995, "Moon Dances"), a collection of the band's past classics reworked by Uģis Vītiņš, with all vocals re-recorded in a professional studio by Baušķenieks, Slava and Edīte Baušķeniece.

An album of new material finally appeared in 2003. Kaķis featured Baušķenieks, Slava and Streiķis, with Gobziņš writing most of the lyrics. Rišķis was absent on the album due to living in the countryside at the time, as well as their inability to properly record live drums in the home studio. Following the release, Baušķenieks, Slava and Rišķis resumed live performances as a power trio.

== Songs covered by other artists ==
- Expatriate Latvian band Akacis covered two songs: "Kāpēc tu mani negribi" and "Svešā malā".
- Former band member Roberts Gobziņš did a dub-styled cover of "Vienmēr klusi" on his 1998 album, Rīta Radio, in collaboration with engineer Edijs Gņedovskis. This album also contained a revamped version of "Man ļoti patīk jaunais vilnis" (titled simply "Jaunais vilnis") that utilised the original backing track from 1982.
- "Milžu cīņa", covered by Crazy Dolls, a one-time commercial project featuring Midis, a former member of Tranzīts and future Riga Records in-house producer.
- "Nāc ārā no ūdens", covered by Kramskis (pseudonym of Ainars Micītis)
- "Sliekutēva vaļasprieks", covered by Tumors on their debut album Ideoti (2007).
- "ŠŅK", also known as "Šņaucēju Klubs", Latvian punk rock/riot grrrl group covered "Kāpēc Tu Mani Negribi?" on their EP "Pats Vainīgs!" (2021).

== Members ==
=== Current lineup ===
- Ingus Baušķenieks – vocals, bass guitar, keyboards (1981–1989, 2001–present)
- Viesturs Slava – vocals, guitar, keyboards (1981–1989, 2001–present)
- Ilgvars Rišķis – drums (1981–1982, 1986–1989, 2003–2008, 2011–present)
- Zigmunds Streiķis – keyboards (1981–1989, 2001–2002, 2010–present)

=== Former members ===
- Mārtiņš Rutkis – guitar (1981–1984)
- Andris Kalniņš – keyboards, saxophone (1982–1984)
- Roberts Gobziņš – vocals (1982–1986)

=== Additional live musicians ===
- Didzis Erra – percussion (2006, 2009–2010, 2012)
- Ģirts Pavēnis – guitar (2006)
- Jānis Burmeisters – drums (2009–2010)
- Uģis Vītiņš – keyboards, saxophone, guitar (2010, 2012, 2018)
- Fabiass Nils Sējāns-Īle — drums (2021 - 2025)

== Discography ==
=== Studio albums ===
Year	Album	Additional information
1981	Bolderājas dzelzceļš	Released on CD in 2003.
1982	Man ļoti patīk jaunais vilnis	Released on CD in 2003.
1984	Alise	Released on CD in 2004.
1984	Vienmēr klusi	Released on CD in 2004.
1986	Depresīvā pilsēta	Released on CD in 2007.
1987	Naktis	Released on CD in 2010.
2003	Kaķis	
2018	Nepieklājīgā meitene	

=== Other releases ===
Year	Album	Additional information
1981	Madonas galerts	Demo album. The band was called Jaunais Sarkanais Karalis at this point.
1989	Sliekutēva vaļasprieks	A double compilation featuring several exclusive out-takes.
1995	Mēness dejas	Reworks/re-recordings of eight songs from the 1980s.
2017	Lentu gabaliņi	Compilation of ten album tracks, remastered for vinyl.

== Equipment ==
=== Guitars ===
- Jolana Star IX
- Jolana Alfa
- Unknown blue Stratocaster clone – Slava's main guitar until 2006
- Fender American Deluxe Ash Stratocaster – since 2007

=== Basses ===
- Jolana Iris Bass
- Orfeus (Höfner replica)
- Unknown headless/bodyless (Steinberger replica)
- Fender Precision bass replica

=== Electronic instruments ===
- Korg LP-10
- Casio CZ-101
- Casio VL-1
- Dynacord electronic drums – Bildes '86 performance only
- Estradin-11 drum machine
- Matador organ, made in East Germany, heavily modified by Kalniņš, who at the time studied electronics.
- Roland JX-3P
- Roland JX-8P, with the Roland PG-800 programming unit
- Panasonic RD-9844 Rhythm Machine
- Yamaha RX-5 drum machine
- Alesis HR-16 drum machine
- Korg M1 – played by Streiķis during the brief 1992 reunion
- Casio CZ-3000 – played by Streiķis in 2011–2013
- Casio XW-P1 – played by Streiķis in 2012, 2013
- Yamaha SY35 – played by Streiķis in 2012

=== MIDI sequencing ===
- Atari 1040ST^{E}
- Alesis MMT-8
- Ensoniq KMX-16 MIDI patch bay

=== Effects ===
- An ЭХО-1 analog tape delay (made in the USSR) is seen in the photographs from the sessions for the demo album Madonas galerts (1981).
- A regular three-head tape recorder was typically used as a delay effect unit on the band's 1980s recordings. Baušķenieks preferred such approach over the use of actual multi-head loop-based units to avoid the continuous deterioration of the single loop of tape.
- Boss DD-2
- Electro-Harmonix Deluxe Electric Mistress
- Ibanez FL9
- MXR Phase 100
- DigiTech RP50 modeling processor, used live by Slava
- Roland GR-20 guitar synthesizer, used live by Slava
