= NSRD =

Latvian experimental music and art group

- Also known as: Nebijušu Sajūtu Restaurēšanas Darbnīca
- Origin: Riga, Latvia
- Genres: Electronic; experimental; minimal wave
- Years active: 1982–1989
- Members: Hārdijs Lediņš (deceased); Juris Boiko (deceased)

NSRD or Nebijušu Sajūtu Restaurēšanas Darbnīca (Latvian for "Workshop for the Restoration of Unfelt Feelings") was a Latvian experimental music group whose main members also worked as contemporary artists, greatly influencing multimedia art in their country. Other temporary members have also been renowned as fashion designers and architects. They played experimental minimal electronic music with influences of new wave and new age.

== Background and artistry ==
The band was formed in 1982 by Hardijs Lediņš, architect and DJ, and Juris Boiko, 'universal artist'. In their early years, they played electronic avant-garde music. They were pioneers of this kind of music in Latvia. Along with their fellow musicians Dzeltenie Pastnieki (who were more popular than NSRD), they were the first new wave musicians in the Latvian SSR. Their records were often available only on magnetic tapes or reel-to-reels.

As they were so untraditional and experimental in the Latvian music scene, they did not gain popularity in the 1980s, a period that has been named 'The Lost Eighties' in Estonian cultural history. However, nowadays, their music is popular among collectors and fans of uncovered obscure music, especially via reissues on the Belgian label STROOM.tv.

While NSRD created music, members also worked on installation art and performance art, which they regarded under their own movement of 'approximate art', and which often incorporated strange and often cryptic motifs and themes. One recurring piece in particular was Dr. Enesera Binokulāro deju kursi (Dr. Eneser’s Binocular Dance Classes), a performance piece that demonstrated Juris Boiko's own alter ego, Dr. Eneser. The performance itself made use of binoculars and glasses, with the intent of visualizing 'a contemplative rhythm of life'.

Dr. Eneser represents the latest – postmodern trend of the eye dance and presents this dance as an ordered world view, that is subjected to a certain rhythm and positions. It is a dream about a new level of human interaction. Possibly without touching. Only by sensing the gentle flutter of partner’s eyelashes. Tête-à-tête. In windless conditions.

== Discography ==
- Invalīdu tramvajs (1983)
- Medicīna un māksla (1985)
- Kuncendorfs un Osendovskis (1984)
- Vējš vītolos (music for performance) (1986)
- Faktu vispār nav (1987)
- Dr. Enesera binokulāro deju kursi (1987)
- 30/15 (1988)
- Neskaties (1988)
- Ieva Akurātere un NSRD (1989)
- Sarkanie rakordi (1989)
- Viegli 3 mana sirds (1992, unreleased)
- NSRD labākās dziesmas (1982–2002) (2002)
- Dziesmas neuzrakstītai lugai (2003, posthumously released in 2006)

=== Reissues and compilations ===
- Workshop For The Restoration Of Unfelt Feelings (2017)
- NSRD (2017)

== See also ==
- Dzeltenie Pastnieki
