= Auseklis Baušķenieks =

Latvian painter

Auseklis Baušķenieks (1910–2007) was a Latvian painter. He is the father of musician Ingus Baušķenieks.
