= Riga State Gymnasium No.1 =

School in Riga, Latvia

Coordinates: 56°57′10″N 24°06′46″E

- Rīgas Valsts 1. ģimnāzija
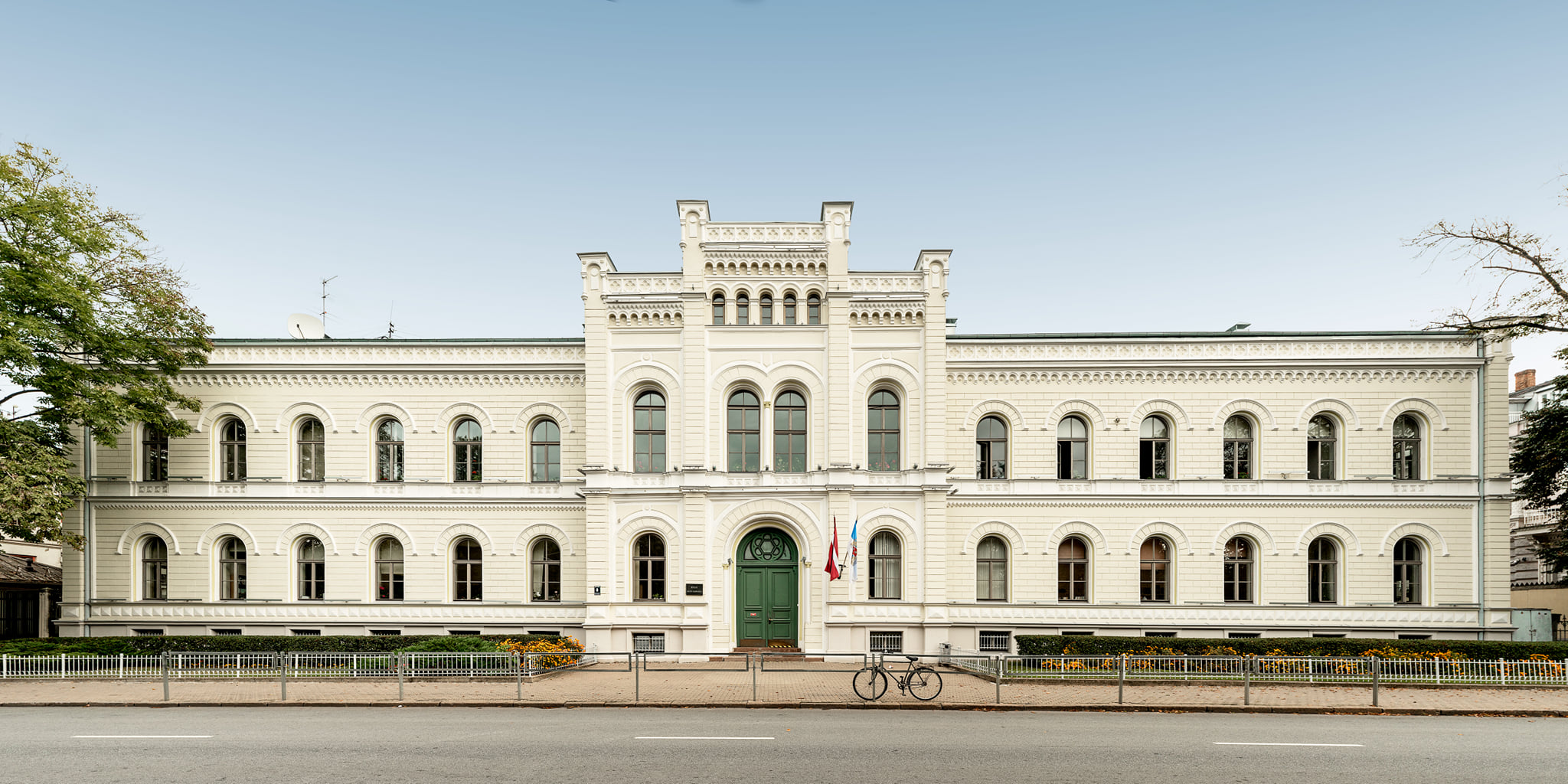
- Building of Riga State Gymnasium No.1

Location
- Raiņa bulvāris 8 Riga, Latvia

Information
- School type: State Gymnasium
- Motto: Pirmā Vienmēr Pirmā (First Always First)
- Established: 1211; 815 years ago
- Headmaster: Māris Brasla
- Head teacher: Dainis Kriķis
- Grades: From 7 till 12
- Classes: 33
- Language: Latvian, English
- Colours: White and Navy Blue
- National ranking: 1st
- Website: https://www.r1g.edu.lv/

Riga State Gymnasium No.1 (Latvian: Rīgas Valsts 1. ģimnāzija), the oldest school in the Baltic states, is a state secondary school in Riga, Latvia, providing education for grades 7 to 12.

The school traces its origins to the Riga Cathedral monastery school (Rīgas Doma klostera skola), which was founded in 1211, when Bishop Albert established Riga's cathedral chapter and its monastery. The school operated in the cloister of Riga Cathedral and was originally intended for the preparation of Catholic clergy; its curriculum followed the medieval Latin-school tradition (trivium: grammar, rhetoric and dialectic).

In 1524, during Reformation-era unrest, the Catholic monastery school was closed; in 1528 the Riga City Council reopened it as a secular municipal school and appointed the Dutch Calvinist preacher Jacobus Battus as its first rector in the re-established form. In 1874 it moved into its present premises at Raiņa bulvāris 8, a purpose-built school building designed by Riga's chief architect Johans Daniels Felsko.

The language of instruction was German from the school's foundation until 1892, when during the Russification period, the school was converted (1894) into a classical gymnasium and later a state gymnasium with Russian as the main language. Latvian became the main language of instruction in 1919. After 1919 the school's name and status changed repeatedly under successive regimes; following the restoration of Latvian independence it regained the name “Rīgas 1. ģimnāzija”, and in 1996 it was renamed “Rīgas Valsts 1. ģimnāzija”.

Today, the gymnasium specialises in mathematics, natural sciences and computer science and is widely recognised for its high academic performance in these fields. Admission to the school is based on a competitive entrance examination in mathematics, with up to ten applicants competing for each available place, making it one of the most selective secondary schools in Latvia. Since 1997, the school has operated the International Baccalaureate (IB) Diploma Programme, enrolling approximately 30 students annually. Instruction in the IB programme is conducted in English, providing an internationally oriented academic track alongside the Latvian national curriculum. It was the first school in the Baltic states to offer the IBO Diploma Programme. Each year, a number of final-year students complete the Deutsches Sprachdiplom (DSD) programme by sitting the DSD examination in addition to the Latvian state graduation exams.

Riga State Gymnasium No.1 ranks first among Latvian secondary schools in national performance evaluations. Its students achieve the highest average results in centralised state examinations nationwide. The school is also recognised for its sustained success in various national and international academic Olympiads and subject competitions, particularly in mathematics, physics, informatics and the natural sciences, where its students regularly receive top distinctions.

Many graduates continue their studies at universities abroad, including leading institutions in the United Kingdom, the Netherlands, Denmark, Germany, Austria, Italy, Sweden, Finland, Switzerland, and the United States.

== Notable alumni ==
- Ingus Baušķenieks – Latvian musician
- Gunnar Birkerts – Latvian American architect
- Tomass Dukurs – Latvian skeleton racer
- Indulis Emsis – Latvian politician, former Prime Minister of Latvia
- Māris Gailis – Latvian businessman, former Prime Minister of Latvia
- Ivars Godmanis – Latvian politician, former Prime Minister of Latvia
- Vytautas Landsbergis-Žemkalnis – Lithuanian architect
- Garlieb Merkel – Baltic German writer and activist
- Wilhelm Ostwald – Baltic German Nobel Prize winning chemist
- Friedrich Parrot – Baltic German naturalist and traveler
- Kristjan Jaak Peterson – Estonian poet, commonly regarded as the founder of modern Estonian poetry
- Mārtiņš Pļaviņš – Latvian beach volleyball player, 2012 Olympic medalist
- Māris Purgailis – Latvian politician, former Mayor of Riga
- Jānis Pliekšāns (Rainis) – Latvian poet and politician
- Einars Repše – Latvian politician, former Prime Minister of Latvia
- Justs Sirmais – Latvian singer
- Pēteris Stučka – Latvian politician, head of the Bolshevik government in Latvia during the Latvian War of Independence
- Daina Taimiņa – Latvian mathematician

== See also ==
- List of oldest schools
