= 8-Bit Operators: The Music of Kraftwerk =

Studio album by 8-Bit Operators
- Released: 2007
- Recorded: 2006–2007
- Genre: Electronic
- Label: Astralwerks/Caroline/Virgin/EMI

8-Bit Operators: The Music of Kraftwerk was released in 2007 by the group 8-Bit Operators on Kraftwerk's US label Astralwerks and EMI Records worldwide. It features cover versions of Kraftwerk songs by several prominent chiptune artists.

In March 2007, the CD release reached as high as number 1 on the CMJ RPM (North American college Electronic) charts.

== Background ==
Inspiration for the project as quoted by Jeremy Kolosine (credited as Executive Producer of the release, and noted founder of the early 80's electronic group Futurisk and chipmusic band Receptors.)

Well the first thing that comes to my mind when I saw a gameboy show was Kraftwerk's Computer World Tour from 1981, where four of them played various handheld devices during the song 'Pocket Calculator'. Plus it came up in a print from a Glomag quote, and an 8 Bit Weapon April Fool's joke that backfired.

This Kraftwerk covers compilation was somewhat unusual in the fact that Kraftwerk's Ralf Hütter selected the final track line-up.

In a subsequent interview, when asked about the 8-Bit Operators release, Ralf Hütter responded:

It is mind stimulating, the minimum/maximum coming from sound levels and thoughts and ideas. Like Autobahn and Trans-Europe Express are very basic and elementary ideas, but they offer a pattern or concept for improvisation.

== CD Track listing ==
No.	Title	Performing artist(s)	Length
1.	"The Robots (Die Roboter)"	Bacalao	3:29
2.	"Pocket Calculator"	Glomag	3:54
3.	"Computer Love"	Covox	3:40
4.	"Showroom Dummies"	Role Model	3:59
5.	"The Model"	Nullsleep	3:57
6.	"Radioactivity"	David E.Sugar	4:12
7.	"Kristallo"	Oliver Wittchow	4:22
8.	"Spacelab"	8-Bit Weapon	4:54
9.	"Computer World (Computerwelt)"	firestARTer	4:26
10.	"Electric Café"	Neotericz	4:03
11.	"Trans-Europe Express"	Receptors	4:02
12.	"Tanzmusik"	Herbert Weixelbaum	3:58
13.	"It's More Fun to Compute"	Bubblyfish	3:52
14.	"Antenna"	Bit Shifter	3:48
15.	"The Man-Machine (Die Mensch-Maschine)"	gwEm and Counter Reset	4:06

== Vinyl ==
A vinyl 12-inch single version was released on 24 February 2007 as a precursor to the full-length CD, and reached as high as number 17 on the Billboard magazine Hot Dance Singles Sales Chart.

Side A of the vinyl consisted of 8-Bit Operators' "Pocket Calculator (Megamix)" version by Glomag (featuring 0x7f, Bit Shifter, Bubblyfish, firestARTer, Hey Kid Nice Robot, Ladybug, M-.-n, Nullsleep, Psilodump, Random, Sidabitball, and David E Sugar).

Side B was an alternate cover of Kraftwerk's "The Robots" by the Los Angeles chipmusic rap group 8-Bit.
