= Kaķis =

2003 album by Dzeltenie Pastnieki

Kakis

Studio album by Dzeltenie Pastnieki
- Released: 2003
- Recorded: June 2001 – April 2002 (Bicycle Systems)
- Genre: Synthpop
- Length: 52:39
- Label: Ingus Baušķenieka ieraksti
- Producer: Kaspars Viškints, Ingus Baušķenieks, Viesturs Slava and Zigmunds Streiķis

Dzeltenie Pastnieki chronology
Mēness dejas (1995)	Kakis (2003)	Lentu gabaliņi (2017)

Kaķis ("a cat") is the seventh album by Latvian band Dzeltenie Pastnieki, released in 2003. It was their first album of new material in 16 years, and the first release, of any kind, in 8 years.

== Track listing ==
1. "Kaķa dziesma" (Ingus Baušķenieks/Roberts Gobziņš/Viesturs Slava/Zigmunds Streiķis) – 5:11
2. "Tagad ir tagad" (Baušķenieks/Gobziņš/Slava/Streiķis) – 4:59
3. "Par sievieti-karotāju – I" (Baušķenieks/Slava/Streiķis) – 0:35
4. "Portfelis ar pīrādziņu" (Baušķenieks/Slava/Streiķis) – 4:37
5. "Gaisa sīnusi" (Baušķenieks/Gobziņš/Slava/Streiķis) – 5:24
6. "Mirklis" (Baušķenieks/Slava/Streiķis) – 4:51
7. "Pārlaidies" (Baušķenieks/Slava/Streiķis) – 6:39
8. "Haizivs un delfīns" (Baušķenieks/Gobziņš/Slava/Streiķis) – 5:19
9. "Par sievieti-karotāju – II" (Baušķenieks/Slava/Streiķis) – 4:35
10. "Kur mana mīlestība aiziet?" (Baušķenieks/Gobziņš/Slava/Streiķis) – 5:32
11. "Vakara zupa" (Baušķenieks/Andris Kalniņš/Mārtiņš Rutkis/Slava/Streiķis) – 0:49
12. "Kā balons, kā vējš" (Baušķenieks/Slava/Streiķis) – 4:33

== Credits ==
- Band - Ingus Baušķenieks, Viesturs Slava, Zigmunds Streiķis
- Illustrations - Anete Baušķeniece
- Kaķis logo - Matīss Baušķenieks
- Sax solo on track 7 - Uģis Vītiņš

== Release history ==
Region	Date	Label	Format	Catalog	Ref.
Latvia	February 24, 2003	Ingus Baušķenieka ieraksti	CD	IBCD 401	
Latvia	April 6, 2016	Ingus Baušķenieka ieraksti	digital download	–	
