= Depresīvā pilsēta =

1986 album by Dzeltenie Pastnieki

Studio album by Dzeltenie Pastnieki
- Released: 1986
- Recorded: 1982 ("Uzvara", Jūrmala), 1984 ("Oktobris", Riga), 1986 ("Pie Lielās Omas", Riga)
- Genre: Synthpop, new wave, post-punk
- Length: 45:28
- Label: Ingus Baušķenieka ieraksti
- Producer: Ingus Baušķenieks, except Viesturs Slava on track 1

Dzeltenie Pastnieki chronology
Vienmēr klusi (1984)	Depresīvā pilsēta (1986)	Naktis (1987)

Depresīvā pilsēta (Latvian for 'depressing city') is the fifth album by Latvian band Dzeltenie Pastnieki, released through magnitizdat in 1986, and 'officially' as late as 2007.

== Track listing ==
1. "Casio Song" (trad., arr. Casio VL-1, lyrics by Roberts Gobziņš) – 1:20
2. "Rudens pastaiga" (Ingus Baušķenieks) – 4:35
3. "Neaizmirstams brīdis" (Baušķenieks) – 4:45
4. "Xipermah" (Baušķenieks) – 3:20
5. "Brīnišķā zupa" (Baušķenieks/Andris Kalniņš/Mārtiņš Rutkis/Viesturs Slava/Zigmunds Streiķis) – 4:30
6. "Mākoņu sniegs" (Slava/Gobziņš) – 3:25
7. "Latīņu maiznieki" (Baušķenieks/Gobziņš/Rišķis/Slava/Streiķis) – 7:50
8. "Pedal Art #2" (Baušķenieks) – 3:05
9. "Nevaru saprast tā neko" (Baušķenieks/Streiķis) – 4:35
10. "Frustrācijas" (Baušķenieks) – 4:10
11. "Tu mana jau" (Baušķenieks) – 4:25

== Credits ==
- Photography - Ingus Baušķenieks and Lindes jaunkundze

== Release history ==
Region	Date	Label	Format	Catalog	Ref.
Latvia	June 12, 2007	Ingus Baušķenieka ieraksti	CD	IBCD 206	
Latvia	August 2007	Ingus Baušķenieka ieraksti	digital download (MP3)	–	
Latvia	April 25, 2016	Ingus Baušķenieka ieraksti	digital download (MP3, FLAC, etc.)	–	
