= Roberts Gobziņš =

- Born: 13 July 1964 (age 61); Riga, Latvian SSR
- Occupation: Musician
- Instrument: Vocals
- Labels: Low Spirit; MicRec; Mapls

Roberts Gobziņš (born 13 July 1964 in Riga, Latvian SSR), also known as Eastbam or East Bam (as a result of his artistic connections with Westbam) is a Latvian entertainer. His career has encompassed work as a musician, DJ, MC, radio personality (often with comedic overtones) and parliamentary candidate. He is best known as a member or collaborator with numerous bands (Dzeltenie Pastnieki, NSRD, Diskomforts, 19 gadi pirms sākuma, Kaija, CSK, Fortress, Dzidriņas Megasistēma, Smalkie Regeji, Los Amigos, Resnie Putni, Twinkle Brothers) and, throughout the 1990s, as a nationally successful solo artist.

He pioneered Latvian language rap music in 1982 by including a rap interlude on Dzeltenie Pastnieki song "Bezcerīgā dziesma" on the album Man ļoti patīk jaunais vilnis and later releasing the first-ever Latvian rap 12-inch single ("Aka Aka") on Westbam's Low Spirit label. Performing live in Germany, he has shared the bill with De La Soul and the Jungle Brothers. In 1997, the avant-garde opera Rolstein on the Beach featured Gobziņš in the role of "The Son of Rothschild". In 2003, Gobziņš took part in "Aka Hip Aka Hop", a collaboration with A.G., Raitis, Giuseppe and Gustavo, celebrating the history of the local scene. He again was the opening act for De La Soul on December 11, 2004 in Riga.

== Discography ==
=== With Dzeltenie Pastnieki ===
- Man ļoti patīk jaunais vilnis (1982) (lyrics on 3 tracks, lead vocals on one)
- Vienmēr klusi (1984) (lyrics on 5 tracks, lead vocals on one)
- Depresīvā pilsēta (1986) (lyrics on 3 tracks, lead vocals on 2)
- Kaķis (2003) (lyrics on 5 tracks)

=== Solo ===
- "Aka Aka" (1990)
- Roberts Gobziņš a.k.a. East Bam (1993)
- Sienāži (1994)
- Man saujā benzīns (1995)
- Roberta Gobziņa 20 labākās dziesmas (1996)
- Rīta radio (1998)
- Biezais vectēvs (2002)

=== Other appearances ===
- 19 gadi pirms sākuma — untitled demo EPs (late 1980s)
- WestBam — "Do It in the Punk Mix" (1987) (B-side of "Do It in the Mix" 12")
- WestBam — The Cabinet (1989) (vocals on "Go Eastbam!")
- Dzidriņas megasistēma — Nes mani vēl (March 18, 1996) (band member)
- Hardijs Lediņš & Kaspars Rolšteins — Rolstein on the Beach (1997)
- NSRD — Labākās dziesmas 1982-2002 (2002) (vocals on "Labrīt, Putra!")
- A.G., Raitis, Giuseppe, Eastbam, Gustavo — "Aka Hip Aka Hop" (2003)
- 19 gadi pirms sākuma — 19 gadi pirms sākuma (2005)
- NSRD — Dziesmas neuzrakstītai lugai (2006) (vocals on "Dons Huans")
