= Azar Swan =

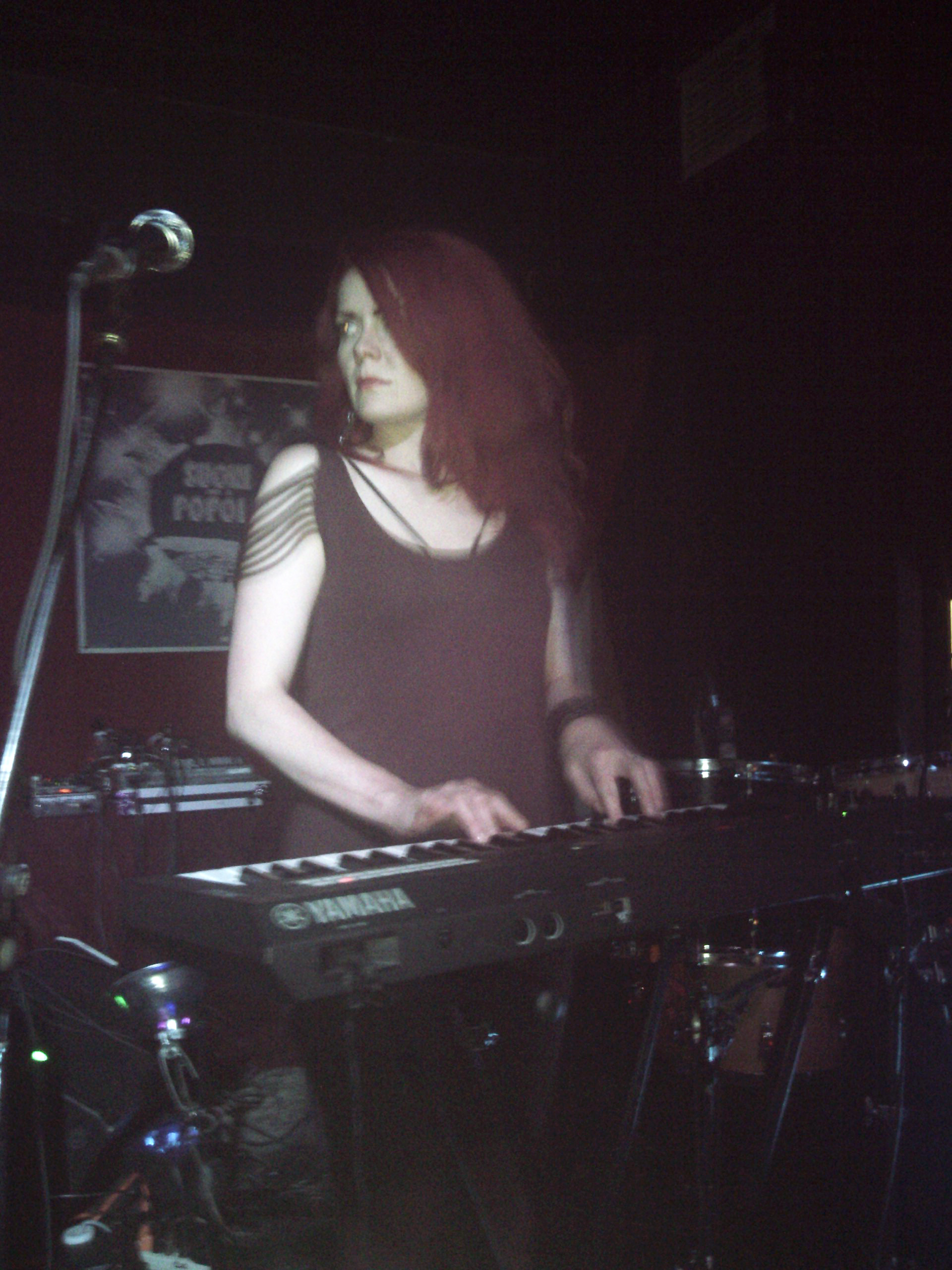
- Azar Swan in Montreal Canada at the La Vitrola

Background information
- Origin: Brooklyn, New York, USA
- Genres: Industrial, pop, experimental
- Years active: 2012−present
- Labels: Handmade Birds, Pendu Sound, Zoo Music
- Spinoff of: Religious to Damn
- Members: Zohra Atash; Joshua Strachan
- Website: http://www.azarswan.com

Azar Swan is the musical project of singer-songwriter and musician Zohra Atash, co-produced by Atash and Joshua Strachan. After dissolving their previous band, Religious to Damn, Atash and Strachan chose to begin experimenting with electronic instrumentation.

== History ==
Azar Swan played their first show on November 10, 2012, followed by notable direct support slots with Prurient, White Lung, Cut Hands, King Dude, Tamaryn and David J, and a BUST Magazine showcase with JD Samson and MEN.

The band premiered their debut single, "Amrika", on USA Today on October 24, 2012. They subsequently released several digital singles including "In My Mouth", which was one of the final releases from Pendu Sound Recordings and was remixed by Drew McDowall of Coil.

In November 2013, Azar Swan released their debut LP, Dance Before the War, on the independent label Handmade Birds. Pitchfork called the band's sound "prime industrial pop" and said that the album's title track was aggressive and accessible with a "bent for experimentation." The band's second album, And Blow Us a Kiss, was released in October 2014 by Zoo Music, the record label owned and operated by Dee Dee Penny of Dum Dum Girls and Brandon Welchez of Crocodiles.

They followed the album up with a double-A-side remix 12" called Variations on Handmade Birds, which featured mixes by Vatican Shadow and Cut Hands. Variations was notable for being the first time that both William Bennett (of Whitehouse) and Dominick Fernow (of Prurient), both widely recognized as two of the most significant pioneering figures in power electronics and noise music, had been featured on the same release.

Strachan and Atash would go on to collaborate with longtime Hospital Productions audio engineer and mixer Kris Lapke for their subsequent work, with Savage Exile in 2017 and The Hissing of a Paper Crane as well as on a single for the Adult Swim Singles Series called Empire Grave, both in 2019. Both albums were reviewed favorably by NPR while Revolver Magazine said that Empire Grave showed an "unmatched capability to create unsettlingly gorgeous dance-floor bangers that are highly listenable yet tremendously unique among their contemporaries."

Azar Swan has released a number of covers including interpretations of songs by David Bowie, Marianne Faithfull, Leonard Cohen, and Bananarama. In 2018, they digitally released a compilation of unreleased songs from the Dance Before The War period called "Sun Meets the Sea."

Atash's sleep disorder, childhood hallucinations, and synesthesia are the impetus for much of Azar Swan's lyrical imagery, which she has described as "living in the space between dreams and reality" and "hallucinogenic realism". Subject matter ranges from anxiety, language, war, bestial hunger and weather, with lyrics mainly written while in a hypnagogic state. Atash has been vocal about her experience as the child of Afghan refugees, as well as her experience as a woman navigating complex cultural experiences and identities.

== Discography ==
=== Studio albums ===
- Dance Before the War (2013, Handmade Birds)
- And Blow Us a Kiss (2014, Zoo Music)
- Savage Exile (2017, aufnahme + wiedergabe)
- The Hissing of a Paper Crane (2019, Primal Architecture Records)

=== Singles ===
- Amrika (2012, self-released)
- Lusty (2013, self-released)
- In My Mouth (2013, Pendu Sound Recordings)
- Cruel Summer (2013, Pendu Sound Recordings)
- Broken English (2014, self-released)
- Variations (2015, Handmade Birds)
- This is Not America/The Future (2017, Primal Architecture Records)
- The Golden Age of Hate (2017, Primal Architecture Records)

=== Compilations ===
- Sun Meets the Sea (2018, Primal Architecture Records)
