= Costis Drygianakis =

Greek composer

Costis Drygianakis (born 1965) is a Greek composer, sound artist, and producer.

He works in the genres of electroacoustic music, musique concrète, field recordings, free improvisation, and electronica. He uses found sounds and field recordings in his compositions.

Drygianakis collaborated with other composers and musicians, such as Ross Daly, Savina Yannatou, Nikos Veliotis, Reinhold Friedl, and created music for film and theatre.

== Early life ==
Drygianakis was born on March 29, 1965, in Volos, Greece. In 1976, his father died from a heart attack. When Drygianakis was 11, his mother bought him a portable cassette recorder, which he used to start experimenting with sound.

From 1982 to 1986, Drygianakis studied physics at the University of Thessaloniki. In 2015, he received a degree in social anthropology.

== Career ==
In 1978, Drygianakis created his first band with Kostas Moraitis, named Blue Encephalitis. In 1981 he organised another band EgoPigo. The group, including Drygianakis, Kostas Pandopoulos and occasionally Nikos Xirakis, stayed active until 1984 and produced two cassette tapes in 1983 and in 1984. EgoPigo was inspired by Robert Fripp, Brian Eno, early Kraftwerk, and Tangerine Dream. The band used rhythm machines and free improvisation by Don Cherry and Sakis Papadimitriou.

=== Optical Musics ===
Drygianakis recorded "Optical Musics" in 1984, inspired by Karlheinz Stockhausen, Jani Christou, Einstuerzende Neubauten and the European free improvisation. The name of the album refers to the connection between the visual and the sonic: since childhood, Drygianakis 'sees music rather than hears it'. The visualization of music in this album is similar to 'soundtracks-of-no-film' of Tangerine Dream.

George Charonitis wrote a review of "Optical Musics": "What exactly are those "Optical Musics"? Or rather what it is n o t. It is not the music that follows some kind of externally imposed aesthetics – or politics – in its nature. It is not commercial music produced for pleasure, nor it is a technocratic enterprise. It does not fall into spontaneous moods of momentous improvisation. It is, however, a result of the internal musical instincts meticulously shaped into poetic sonic arrangements, moving wildly, except for their internal need for structured coexistence. More concretely, it is a collection of sounds: synthesizer, percussion, piano, the guitar, bass guitar, crickets, the sea, pots etc.". Charonitis wrote that "Optical Musics" is 'a narrative that always stays open, both towards the images, from which it emerged, and to the images it aspires to create'.

In 2017, Drygianakis published another collection of recordings: "Optical Musics. The First Words. Recordings 1984-1987". The publication included a booklet with memories and comments from the band members.

=== 1988–1994 ===
During 1988–1994 Drygianakis recorded "The Pentheus Myth" (in collaboration with Kostas Pandopoulos, 2019), "Hours and Seasons" (1993) and "Optical Musics Volume Two" (2023). In "Optical Musics Volume Two", Ross Daly and Sokratis Sinopoulos played music of Ottoman traditions.

Drygianakis contributed to Graffiti, an electronic music studio in Larissa, Greece.

=== 1997–2003 ===
At the end of the 1990s, Drygianakis mostly focused on solo projects. These included "Post-optical landscapes" (1999), "Though I speak with the tongues of men and of angels" (1999), and "Chondros and Katsiani on the Mountain" (1998, 2019).

François Couture writes about "Post-optical Landscapes": "Post-Optical Landscapes is part musique concrète, part sound collage, and part audio art, but belongs to none of these categories, being as unclassifiable as some of the works coming out of the Québecois collective Avatar (especially Jocelyn Robert's early CDs) or some German hörspiel."

Drygianakis taught computer music at Exodos, a rehabilitation centre for drug users, from 2000 to 2004.

=== 2013–2019 ===
Drygianakis' mother Eleni died in 2012. The releases of "Blown into Breeze" (2013), "άδηλα και κρύφια" (2015), "Wings of winds" (2016), "k/l" (collaboration with Lambros Zafeiropoulos, 2017), "Chained to the world" (2019) and "The Approach" (2019) came out as a result of Drygianakis's mourning for his mother.

In his review of "Wings of winds", Julian Cowley from the Wire magazine writes about 'multi-layered frenetic improvising' and 'raucous polyphony' of the album.

=== 2020–2022 ===
Drygianakis collaborated with Matt Atkins (2020), with Duso (2021), with Reinhold Friedl (2025), made soundtracks for "Back to Earth" (2021), "Salt for Svanetia", (2021), "Return to homeland" (2025), and published albums "Adrift Landscapes" (2020), "New Moon" (2021), "Lost years and beyond" (2022).

Since 2020, Drygianakis has been an associate of Volos Academy for Theological Studies.

== Ethnography of music ==
Drygianakis published music and archival material about local traditions.

- "Let's sing in praise: Byzantine hymns from the Melpo Merlier Collection" (2000, co-edited by Markos Dragoumis and Thanassis Moraitis)
- "Theatre in Volos" (2001)
- "Magnesia: Music Traditions" (2001)
- "Thessaly 1881-2001: Persons and Events in Folk Songs" (2001)
- "Hymns of Passion and the Resurrection from Churches of Eastern Thessaly" (Volos Academy Publications, 2014)
- "The bride is a flower: Songs of the Greek Roma people from Sofades"
- "Karditsa" (2015, co-edited by Vangelis Bandelas)
- "Oh you, poor Skopelos...": Songs from Skopelos, recorded in 1967 for the Melpo Merlier Collection (2016), co-edited by Markos Dragoumis and Thanassis Moraitis).
