= Viduslaiki =

Viduslaiki ("The Middle Ages") is a solo album by Ingus Baušķenieks, released in 2003. The album is Baušķenieks' first solo album, released by "Ingus Baušķenieka ieraksti". The album was recorded in Baušķenieks' home studio from 1999–2000.

== Track listing ==
1. Vēss vērmelēm (instr.) – 3:50
2. Ķirbis Irbis (featuring Uģis Vītiņš) – 3:32
3. Pasaulīte pilna vārdu – 4:21
4. Vēss vērmelēm - 4:58
5. Vai mums viss ir ļauts? – 4:57
6. Vissaldākās sēnes uz mēness – 5:18
7. Es laižos kā sapnī – 7:10
8. Man dvēsele vien – 4:43
9. Tu & tavs autobuss – 4:06
