= Vaura =

American experimental band

- Origin: Brooklyn, New York, U.S.
- Genres: Blackgaze, post-punk, gothic rock, experimental
- Years active: 2009–present
- Labels: Wierd, Profound Lore, The Flenser
- Members: Joshua Strachan; Kevin Hufnagel; Toby Driver
- Past members: Charlie Schmid
- Website: www.vaura.bandcamp.com

Vaura is an American experimental band from Brooklyn, New York, United States, formed in 2009 by singer, guitarist and primary songwriter Joshua Strachan and featuring Kevin Hufnagel (Dysrhythmia, Gorguts) on lead guitar, Toby Driver (Kayo Dot, Maudlin of the Well, Secret Chiefs 3) on bass.

Vaura's debut album, Selenelion, was released on Wierd Records in February 2011. Stereogum described the record as "a warped, heady strain of metal, one that incorporates bits and pieces of black metal, post-rock, and prog, melting them all into one singular brooding sludge".

The band has toured in support of French group Alcest and has played with Bloody Panda, Sannhet, Deafheaven, Monarch and Castevet.

In early 2013, Vaura was signed to Profound Lore Records. Their sophomore effort, The Missing, was released by the label on November 12, 2013, followed by a third LP in 2019 entitled Sables which was mixed by longtime Scott Walker collaborator Peter Walsh. The Missing was named one of Pitchfork's Best Metal Albums of the Year, while The Wire called Sables "art-pop with an 80s sheen nodding to bands like Japan, The Fixx, and even Discipline-era King Crimson."

== Discography ==
=== Studio albums ===
- Selenelion (2012, Wierd)
- The Missing (2013, Profound Lore)
- Sables (2019, Profound Lore)
- Vista of Deviant Anatomies (2022, Primal Architecture Records)
