= Tilly Vosburgh =

English actress (born 1960)

- Born: Matilda Vosburgh; 17 December 1960 (age 65); London, England
- Occupation: Actress

Matilda Vosburgh (born 17 December 1960) is a British character actress.

== Early life ==
Born in the Westminster district of London, England, Vosburgh is the daughter of comedy writer and lyricist Dick Vosburgh and former actress Beryl Vosburgh (née Roques). She was educated at Camden School for Girls. As a child, Tilly began attending after-school classes at the Anna Scher Theatre. This soon led to minor roles in British television series, with appearances in The Prince and the Pauper, Grange Hill, and Crown Court.

== Career ==
=== Film and television ===
Vosburgh went on to star in the films Phoelix and Radio On in the late 1970s. Some of her other appearances include roles in The Gentle Touch, Maria Marten, Gulliver in Lilliput, Treatment, Meantime, You'll Never See Me Again, Will You Love Me Tomorrow, Strong Poison, Victoria Wood: As Seen on TV, and Minder throughout the eighties. Vosburgh also featured in the films The Missionary, The Pirates of Penzance, and Erik the Viking in the eighties. In the nineties, she appeared in Poirot, Inspector Morse, A Touch of Frost, five episodes of The Men's Room as Delia, The Darling Buds of May Christmas Special in 1991 as Betty Mason, and in the 1994 film Shopping. She featured in the comedy series Full Stretch in 1993. One role that propelled her towards stardom was as 'Tilly' in the partially-improvised comedy film There's No Business... with Raw Sex (Simon Brint and Rowland Rivron) and The Oblivion Boys. She played Ella Twite in six episodes of Blackhearts in Battersea (1995–1996).

From 1997 to 1999, Vosburgh played Susan Rose in 64 episodes of the popular British soap opera EastEnders on BBC1. This major role paved the way to more work in many British TV series such as The Infinite Worlds of H. G. Wells, Tipping the Velvet, The Bill, Margery & Gladys, The Smoking Room, Murder Prevention, Holby City, New Tricks, Waking the Dead, The Ruby in the Smoke, Casualty, Doctors, and Inside Man.

Vosburgh continued to appear in films from 2000 onwards, including Paranoid and The Suicidal Dog in 2000, Silent Cry and Dr Jekyll and Mr Hyde in 2002, Vera Drake in 2004, Atonement and Boy A in 2007, and The Awakening and Turnout, both released in 2011.

=== Music ===
She also featured in the band The Antelopes, a post-punk band from 1980 that featured Steve Empson, Martin Liddard, Glenn Dallender and Vince Brown. They released one single on Jungle Records in 1981, a double "A"-side "Prisoners"/"Hour of Light".

=== Teaching ===
Vosburgh also teaches television and film acting at LSMT, MTA, CPA, and TL.

=== Writing ===
She has written a short film, Domestic Flight, which has played in festivals around the world.

=== Radio ===
Vosburgh is also a radio actor, and has appeared in a BBC Radio 4 Play of the Day Bringing Eddie Home by John Peacock, based on a true story of the fight by East End couple Edna and Jack Wallace to get their son's body brought home from Aden, and the ensuing fight for the rights of British service personnel. Vosburgh played the role of the younger Edna Wallace and the play also included other ex-EastEnders actors Bill Treacher, Edna Doré, Todd Carty and Joe Absolom.

== Personal life ==
Vosburgh married Ade Campbell in 2001 and the couple have two children together. Their son Billy played Natalie's younger "octopus" brother in the film Love Actually. Her brother Matthew "Maf" Vosburgh was a member of the cult synth pop duo Solid Space.
