= Par Avion (album) =

Studio album by Xeno & Oaklander
- Released: June 24, 2014
- Studio: X&O (Brooklyn, New York)
- Length: 31:59
- Label: Ghostly International
- Producer: Sean McBride; Liz Wendelbo

Xeno & Oaklander chronology
| Sets & Lights (2011) | Par Avion (2014) | Topiary (2016) |

Singles from Par Avion
- 1. "Sheen" Released: May 15, 2013; 2. "Par Avion" Released: November 12, 2013; 3. "Interface" Released: April 15, 2014

Par Avion is a studio album by Xeno & Oaklander, a duo of Sean McBride and Liz Wendelbo. It was released on June 24, 2014, through Ghostly International. It received generally favorable reviews from critics.

== Background ==
Xeno & Oaklander consists of American musician Sean McBride and French/Norwegian musician Liz Wendelbo. They are originally from Brooklyn, New York.

In 2013, the duo released the single "Sheen" through Electric Voice. It was made available as a digital download accompanied with a silk-screened, pocket-sized pamphlet, limited to 2,000 copies. The duo then signed to Ghostly International and released the singles "Par Avion" (2013) and "Interface" (2014).

For Par Avion, the duo took inspiration from synesthesia. The album was released on June 24, 2014, through Ghostly International. Music videos were released for the songs "Sheen" and "Par Avion".

== Critical reception ==
Professional ratings
Aggregate scores
| Source | Rating |
|---|---|
| Metacritic | 72/100 |
Review scores
| Source | Rating |
| AllMusic | 4/5 stars |
| Exclaim! | 6/10 |
| The Line of Best Fit | 6/10 |
| Uncut | 8/10 |

According to the review aggregator Metacritic, Par Avion received "generally favorable reviews" based on a weighted average score of 72 out of 100 from 7 critic scores.

Ashley Zlatopolsky of Exclaim! stated, "Xeno & Oaklander aren't modest or shy about their synth use; it's the main element in each of the nine tracks, slowed down and sped up to suit corresponding echoing vocals (both in English and French) balanced with distant, low-key drums." Heather Phares of AllMusic commented that "the album presents some of their most delicate and nuanced material alongside some of their most direct songs." She added, "At once hookier and more abstract than some of X&O's previous albums, Par Avion is another subtle step forward for the duo that should please longtime fans and win new ones."

Chris Todd of The Line of Best Fit commented that "Par Avion is awash with slightly gothic electronic doom in thrall to Giorgio Moroder and proto-industrial types Crash Course in Science in equal measure, but by continuing to use such a clinical production ethic, they will always remain obtuse, pale executors of the slightly indie, slightly analogue thing, and slightly ethereal, esoteric electro thing." Joe Sweeny of The Quietus stated, "McBride and Wendelbo spend a third of the album singing two different lyric sheets simultaneously, and while it's an ambitious idea when you look at the words side by side, it has a muddying effect on a style that thrives on simplicity."

== Track listing ==
All tracks are written by Sean McBride and Liz Wendelbo.

Par Avion track listing
| No. | Title | Length |
|---|---|---|
| 1. | "Interface" | 5:01 |
| 2. | "Lastly" | 3:09 |
| 3. | "Sheen" | 3:57 |
| 4. | "Par Avion" | 4:17 |
| 5. | "Jasmine Nights" | 4:14 |
| 6. | "Reflections" | 2:26 |
| 7. | "Nuage d'Ivoire" | 3:23 |
| 8. | "Providence" | 2:11 |
| 9. | "G. Bruno" | 3:20 |
| Total length: | | 31:59 |

== Personnel ==
Credits adapted from liner notes.

- Sean McBride – synthesizer, drum machine, vocals, production
- Liz Wendelbo – synthesizer, drum machine, vocals, production, assemblage, design
- Rick Kwan – mixing (1, 2, 9)
- Chris Coady – mixing (3–8)
- Heba Kadry – mastering
- Kelsey Henderson – painting
- Xeno & Oaklander – excavated silkscreens
