= Space Museum (album) =

Studio album by Solid Space
- Released: 1982
- Recorded: 1982
- Studio: Starforce Studios, Clapham and The Shed, Ilford
- Genre: Minimal wave; synthpop
- Length: 30:56
- Label: In Phaze
- Producer: Pat Bermingham

Space Museum is the sole studio album by British minimal wave band Solid Space. It was released in 1982 by In Phaze Records through cassette, eventually becoming a rarity. It was produced by the record label's owner Pat Bermingham.

The album was named number 2 on Fact magazine's list of "The 20 best Minimal Wave records ever made".

== Background and release ==
The album's sound has been described as "cold, disconnected, minimal synth-pop full of eerie moods and bizarre melodies." It features lyrics inspired by science fiction novels and television programs, in particular the popular shows Doctor Who and Captain Scarlet and the Mysterons, and often deal with traveling through the galaxy, "delivered in a robotic deadpan vocals." Tracks such as "A Darkness In My Soul" (inspired by the Dean Koontz novel of the same name), "Destination Moon" (based on The Adventures of Tintin novel of the same name), and "Tenth Planet" were also considered as "dark, atmospheric and atypical", because they feature guitar along with synthesizers and drum machines.

The cover art is taken from a publicity still from the 1968 Doctor Who serial The Wheel in Space, while the title derives from the 1965 serial The Space Museum. Two song titles on the album reference the Doctor Who serials The Tenth Planet and Earthshock, both of which, like The Wheel in Space, feature the Cybermen.

On 10 December 2017, a remastered version of Space Museum was released by the label Dark Entries. It is the first legitimate reissue of the album on vinyl, having been supervised and approved by the members of Solid Space, and was designed to curb the amount of bootleg copies that have circulated since its release. The LP expands the original tracklisting to feature two bonus tracks - a cover of "Tutti Lo Sanno" by Marine Girls, and "Platform 6" by the band's original incarnation, Exhibit A - plus a 11x11 double sided insert with lyrics, notes, and never-seen-before photographs of the group, as well as a postcard replica of the album's original advert.

== Track listing ==
All songs written by Dan Goldstein and Matthew Vosburgh, except where noted.

No.	Title	Length
1.	"Afghan Dance"	1:49
2.	"Spectrum is Green"	3:11
3.	"Destination Moon"	2:41
4.	"The Guests"	1:57
5.	"New Statue ("Morning Song")" (Contains excerpts from the poem "Morning Song" by Sylvia Plath)	5:42
6.	"A Darkness In My Soul"	3:56
7.	"Radio France"	2:15
8.	"Tenth Planet"	2:52
9.	"Earthshock"	1:37
10.	"Contemplation" (Dan Goldstein, Matthew Vosburgh, Jonathan Weinreich)	3:15
11.	"Please Don't Fade Away..."	1:39

== Personnel ==
- Dan Goldstein – keyboards, vocals, lyrics (tracks 3, 5-8, 10, 11)
- Matthew Vosburgh – guitar, bass, keyboards, vocals, lyrics (track 2)
- Jonathan "Jon Winegum" Weinreich – saxophone (track 5), clarinet (track 10)
- Pat Bermingham – production
