= Bolderājas dzelzceļš =

1981 album by Dzeltenie Pastnieki

Studio album by Dzeltenie Pastnieki
- Released: 1981
- Recorded: September 11 – October 6, 1981 ("Incognito", Riga)
- Genre: New wave, post-punk
- Length: 44:22
- Label: Ingus Baušķenieka ieraksti
- Producer: Ingus Baušķenieks and Mārtiņš Rutkis

Dzeltenie Pastnieki chronology
| Madonas galerts (1981) | Bolderājas dzelzceļš (1981) | Man ļoti patīk jaunais vilnis (1982) |

Bolderājas dzelzceļš (English: The Railroad of/to Bolderāja) is the full-length debut album by Latvian band Dzeltenie Pastnieki, following the demo recording Madonas galerts. It was released by means of magnitizdat in 1981, and 'officially' in 2003. The title of the album is commonly misspelt as Bolderājas dzelzsceļš – including on the officially released CD, cassette and LP.

== Track listing ==
1. "Zaļais garais vilciens" (Ingus Baušķenieks/Juris Boiko) 7:28
2. "Sliktā dziesma par zaķu salu" (Hardijs Lediņš/Boiko) 3:53
3. "Čemodāns" (Baušķenieks/Lediņš) 5:47
4. "Lai tu aizmirstu" (Baušķenieks) 4:47
5. "Lokomotīve jūras krastā" (Lediņš) 2:41
6. "Nāc ārā no ūdens" (Lediņš) 5:27
7. "Avū avū baltas kājas" (trad., arr. Dzeltenie Pastnieki) 2:17
8. "Trijos naktī" (Baušķenieks) 3:36
9. "Mana kafejnīca ir salauzta" (Lediņš/Boiko) 4:02
10. "Dzeltenais viltus pastnieks" (Viesturs Slava/Mārtiņš Rutkis/Lediņš) 4:38

== Credits ==
- Cover photography - Gvido Kajons
- Inlay photography - Vilnis Vītoliņš, Mārcis Bendiks

== Release history ==
| Region | Date | Label | Format | Catalog | Ref. |
|---|---|---|---|---|---|
| Latvia | October 24, 2003 | Ingus Baušķenieka ieraksti | CD | IBCD 201 | |
| Latvia | August 2007 | Ingus Baušķenieka ieraksti | digital download (MP3) | – | |
| Latvia | April 8, 2016 | Ingus Baušķenieka ieraksti | digital download (MP3, FLAC, etc.) | – | |
| US & Canada | November 1, 2017 | Vestibular Records | cassette | VR-004 | |
| Latvia | February 2020 | Ingus Baušķenieka ieraksti | LP | IBLP 801 | |
