= Blacklist (band) =

American rock band (2005–2011)

- Origin: Brooklyn, New York, USA
- Genres: Indie rock; post-punk revival; gothic rock
- Years active: 2005–2011; 2020-present
- Labels: Wierd Records; Profound Lore Records
- Members: Joshua Strachan; Ryan Rayhill; Glenn Maryansky; James Minor
- Website: www.listofblack.com

Blacklist is a band from Brooklyn, New York composed of Joshua Strachan (vocals, guitar), Ryan Rayhill (bass), Glenn Maryansky (drums) and James Minor (guitar). They were one of the flagship bands of painter Pieter Schoolwerth's Wierd Records imprint. The band's atmospheric modern rock music was described as "anthemic"; "darkly erotic, strangely sensual"; and "a much-needed anomaly in NYC's music scene". They were sometimes classified as part of the post-punk revival, though their sound was generally more dense, incorporating elements of shoegaze and heavy metal with cold wave. The members often cited influences like My Bloody Valentine, Motörhead and Black Sabbath as influences alongside bands like the Comsat Angels, Killing Joke and the Sound.

The band's last live performance was in April 2011 with Locrian and labelmate Martial Canterel, co-presented by Wierd Records and Stereogum.

== Releases ==
Blacklist's eponymous first EP was self-released in 2006, but subsequently went out of print. Released by Wierd in 2007, the Solidaire EP included a cover of seminal French coldwave band Asylum Party's song "Pure Joy in My Heart." The band's debut LP, Midnight of the Century, mixed by Ed Buller and mastered by Howie Weinberg, was released digitally on May 26, 2009, and on CD on July 28, 2009. The album title referenced revolutionary Victor Serge's book, Midnight in the Century. After a long hiatus, the band returned in summer of 2020 with the "Disorder" single, inspired by the racial justice protests in the United States, and the B-Side "No Secret Islands" which takes aim at the dystopian fantasies of tech billionaires. In April 2022 "The Final Resistance" was announced as the lead single from their latest LP, Afterworld, what was released on October 28, 2022, via Profound Lore Records.

== Lyrics ==
Blacklist's lyrics often contained references to various authors, philosophers, and historical events. The song "Shock in the Hotel Falcon" was inspired by George Orwell's Homage to Catalonia, while "Language of the Living Dead" referenced the work of Slovenian philosopher Slavoj Žižek. The album's liner notes quoted Jacques Lacan, Don Delillo, Rumi and Salman Rushdie. While many bands who play similar music often traffic in imagery relating to the supernatural, Strachan himself identified his message as "militantly humanistic", combining Geezer Butler and Ozzy Osbourne's more politically charged lyrics like "Children of the Grave", "Electric Funeral" and "Killer of Giants" with the cerebral work of Richey Edwards of the Manic Street Preachers.

== Discography ==
=== Studio albums ===
- Midnight of the Century (2009, Wierd Records)
- Afterworld (2022, Profound Lore Records)

=== EPs ===
- Blacklist (2006, self-released)
- Solidaire (2007, Wierd Records)

=== Compilations ===
- "Interiors" featured on P.E.A.C.E. (2010, Buffet Libre/Amnesty International, Spain)
