= Man ļoti patīk jaunais vilnis =

1982 album by Dzeltenie Pastnieki

Studio album by Dzeltenie Pastnieki
- Released: 1982
- Recorded: July 27 – September 10, 1982 (kolkhoz "Uzvara", Jūrmala)
- Genre: Synthpop, new wave, post-punk
- Length: 36:31
- Label: Ingus Baušķenieka ieraksti
- Producer: Ingus Baušķenieks and Dzeltenie Pastnieki

Dzeltenie Pastnieki chronology
Bolderājas dzelzceļš (1981)	Man ļoti patīk jaunais vilnis (1982)	Alise (1984)

Man ļoti patīk jaunais vilnis is the second album by Latvian band Dzeltenie Pastnieki, released through magnitizdat in 1982, and 'officially' in 2003. The name of the album is Latvian for "I really like new wave". It was essentially recorded on the premises of the fishing kolkhoz "Uzvara" in Lielupe, Jūrmala.

== Track listing ==
1. "Kāpēc tu mani negribi?" (Ingus Baušķenieks/Roberts Gobziņš/Mārtiņš Rutkis/Viesturs Slava/Zigmuns Streiķis)
2. "Bezcerīgā dziesma" (Baušķenieks/Gobziņš/Andris Kalniņš/Rutkis/Slava)
3. "Ai, sūnu zaļais (koši dzeltenais)" (Baušķenieks/Slava/Streiķis/Hardijs Lediņš)
4. "Ko labāk vēlies" (Baušķenieks/Slava/Streiķis)
5. "Nāc un piedod" (Baušķenieks/Rutkis/Slava/Streiķis)
6. "Mana vasara aiziet" (Baušķenieks/Streiķis)
7. "Trakais pastnieks" (Baušķenieks/Slava/Streiķis)
8. "Man ļoti patīk jaunais vilni" (Baušķenieks/Gobziņš/Slava)

== Credits ==
- Vocal on track 1 — Edīte Grīnberga
- Percussion on track 8 — Ņikita
- Front cover drawing and album title caption — Annija Jeromane
- Cover photography — Gvido Kajons
- Special thanks to Mārtiņš Saulespurēns and F. Tumanovs

== Release history ==
Region	Date	Label	Format	Catalog	Ref.
Latvia	December 30, 2003	Ingus Baušķenieka ieraksti	CD	IBCD 202	
Latvia	August 2007	Ingus Baušķenieka ieraksti	Digital download (MP3)	–	
Latvia	April 8, 2016	Ingus Baušķenieka ieraksti	Digital download (MP3, FLAC, etc.)	–	
