= Jeremy Kolosine =

Jeremy Kolosine, born Emin Jeremy Kolosine on November 12, 1960 in Hackney, England, and currently residing in Roanoke, Virginia , is an electronic music performer, recording artist, composer and producer.

He is noted as being executive producer of 8-Bit Operators: The Music of Kraftwerk, and as a founding member of Futurisk.

He has also recorded and performed as Receptors, Ksine and in the band Shakespace.
