= Veronica Vasicka =

American radio personality

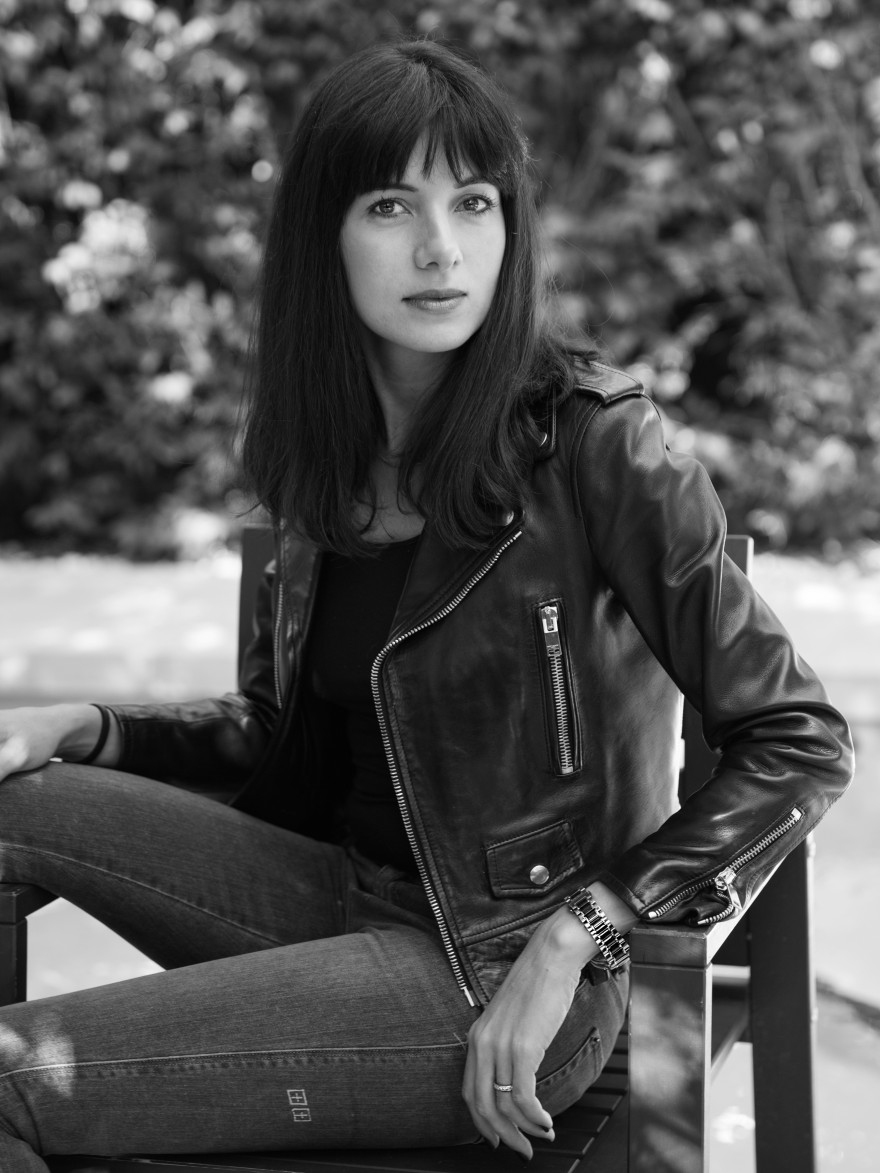
- Vasicka in 2017
- Born: March 18, 1975 (age 51); New York

Veronica Vasicka (/vəˈsiːkə/; born 18 March 1975) is an American photographer, record label founder, radio and club DJ. She is the founder of Minimal Wave Records, a record label focused on obscure electronic music from the 1970s and 1980s, as well as its sub label Cititrax, a platform for newer artists.

== Early life and education ==
Vasicka was born in Coney Island, Brooklyn to a Uruguayan mother and Czech father. She grew up in Greenwich Village, Manhattan. At an early age, she had a passion for music and photography.

She attended The Dalton School, and later studied photography at the Rhode Island School of Design, graduating with honors. She returned to New York City and worked as a photographer for Index Magazine, and later co-founded East Village Radio.

== Career ==
Inspired by the music she gathered for her weekly two-hour radio show at East Village Radio, Vasicka launched Minimal Wave Records in 2005. She specializes in obscure electronic music, especially new wave, Italo disco, and house music. Her focus is on bringing rare recordings to the public via the record label, as well as her sublabel Cititrax, which features newer bands and classic house reissues.

Vasicka hosted a weekly radio show on East Village Radio from 2003 to 2014. In addition to her radio work, Vasicka has an extensive DJ career, performing at events, clubs, and festivals both in New York City and across the globe. In 2010, she compiled "The Minimal Wave Tapes Volume One", released on Stones Throw Records. The follow-up, "The Minimal Wave Tapes Volume Two", was released in 2012.

Currently, Veronica hosts a monthly radio show on NTS Radio.
