= Minimal Wave Records =

- Founded: November 2005
- Founder: Veronica Vasicka
- Distributor: Independent
- Genre: Minimal wave, electronic music, synth-pop, post-punk
- Country of origin: United States
- Location: New York, New York, United States
- Official website: www.minimalwave.com

Minimal Wave Records is a New York City-based independent record label founded by Veronica Vasicka in 2005. The label was launched "to create a network for synth wave enthusiasts and promote 80s electronic music via an online archive and vinyl releases. The label specializes in high-quality vinyl pressings of minimal synth and new wave artists."

Vasicka also curates Minimal Wave, a weekly Internet radio show broadcast on East Village Radio, for which she was the original director of programming. The weekly show was founded as Minimal-Electronik Plus, and was later renamed. Through vanity Web searches, artists discovered that selections from their cassette-only releases had been played on the show. Vasicka invited them to send her more music, and this led to the creation of the Minimal Wave label, as well as the sublabel Cititrax for newer material and house music.

== Bibliography ==
- Jed Lipinski, "Electronic Music's Own Archaeologist", New York Times, April 11, 2012.
