= Wierd Records =

American independent record label

- Founded: 2006
- Founder: Pieter Schoolwerth
- Genre: New York City
- Country of origin: U.S.
- Location: Industrial, noise, cold wave, minimal wave, power electronics, electronic body music
- Official website: wierdrecords.com

Wierd Records is an American independent record label, founded in New York City by Pieter Schoolwerth in 2006.

"Wierd" was also the name for an associated weekly DJ night, now defunct, that started at Southside Lounge in Brooklyn in 2003, later held at Home Sweet Home in Manhattan. Schoolwerth has also performed with power electronics outfit Bloodyminded since the mid-'90s and was previously a member of Crash Worship.

Associated groups include Røsenkøpf, Martial Canterel, Led Er Est, Xeno & Oaklander, Blacklist, Frank (just Frank), Plastic Flowers, and Opus Finis.

The groups are also linked to developments in the visual arts; Schoolwerth is a noted conceptualist painter. Liz Wendelbo, a member of Xeno & Oaklander, is also a filmmaker, positing "cold cinema" as filmmaking that "predicates resistance to cinema as a virtual medium".

== Style ==
The label takes inspiration from European permutations of post-punk, minimal synth, and dream pop, and from synthesizer-based groups described as "minimal electronics" (similar to electropunk or minimal electronica). The label is especially associated with a revival of the French cold wave style. The label positions itself as eccentric, marginal, and somewhat psychedelic, and in opposition to the mainstream goth subculture. Schoolwerth declares, "We don’t use the term goth. It has a derogatory connotation. It’s degenerated into some kind of ironic B-horror film thing. It’s lost its elegance, sophistication, and most importantly, its pretentiousness."
