= Minimal wave =

Music genre

- Stylistic origins: Synth-pop; post-punk; coldwave; new wave
- Cultural origins: 1970s–1980s
- Typical instruments: Synthesisers, drum machine

Other topics
- Minimal Wave Records

Minimal wave is a broad classification of music that comprises obscure, atypical examples of genres such as new wave, stripped-down electronic or synthesizer music, synth-pop, post-punk, and coldwave. Most of the music tends to focus on electronic, pre-MIDI instrumentation and themes of sincere, rather than ironic, detachment.

The term "minimal wave" draws some contention. Although much minimal wave is classified in the late 1970s and early 1980s and subsequently appeared on bootleg and one-off compilations, the genre did not have a name until a record label of the same name began releasing compilations and reissues in the mid-2000s.

== Background and etymology ==
Minimal Wave as a synecdoche of a broader scene has been a term of contention for many. The phrase stems from Veronica Vasicka's restoration project/record label of the same name, but has become something of a stand-in for the entire spectrum of music Vasicka championed.

— Timothy Gabriele of PopMatters, 2010

Veronica Vasicka, founder of the Minimal Wave record label, claims to have coined the genre name. She stated in a 2009 interview:

I had this collection of Dutch magazines from the early '80s, and they kept using the terms "minimal electronics", "new wave", "coldwave" and a bunch of others. I kind of thought there should be a term that covers all this music, and I thought "minimal wave" could be it. When I registered the website, I was able to register the name.

For a 2009 publicity piece, Vasicka wrote that the music overlaps with several other genres, "The Minimal Wave genre actually formed only several years ago, as a result of a resurgence of interest in the roots of pre-MIDI electronic new wave (1978–1985), mainly from North America, Europe and Japan. This music is sometimes referred to as minimal electronic, minimal synth, coldwave, new wave, technopop, or synth-pop, depending on the particular style, year, and location of the band." She identifies Orchestral Manoeuvres in the Dark's Organisation, Depeche Mode's Speak & Spell, John Foxx's Metamatic, Kraftwerk's The Man-Machine, Yellow Magic Orchestra's Solid State Survivor, and early Human League as influential in the development of the genre.

In its heyday, the music's demographic had subcultures all over the world, but was most critical in Europe (particularly the United Kingdom) and the United States, where the machines used to create this type of music were readily available. The fanzine CLEM (Contact List Of Electronic Musicians) helped create a worldwide community of musicians in the genre, prior to the Internet. Many of the musicians in the genre collaborated via mail.

== Characteristics ==
According to Vasicka, the genre's hallmarks include minimal musical structures, relatively unpolished production, and the use of analog synthesizers and drum machines manufactured in the 1970s and 1980s. The instrumental arrangements featured "mechanical beats" and "short repetitive patterns", plus "noticeably synthesized drum programming and trebly, thin melodies" which emphasized the artificiality of synthesized sound. Vocal arrangements "acted as a counterpoint to that artificiality." Musicians in the genre were often influenced by avant-garde movements such as futurism and constructivism, and by the literature of science fiction and existentialism.

== See also ==
- Dark wave
- Microgenres
