= Ingus Baušķenieks =

Latvian musician

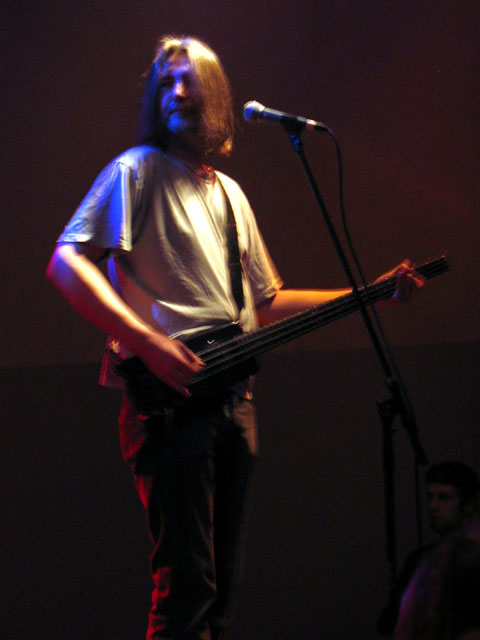

Background information
- Born: December 30, 1956 (age 69); Riga, Latvia
- Genres: New wave Art rock Electronic; Postpops
- Occupations: Singer multi-instrumentalist record producer
- Instruments: Vocals, bass guitar, guitar, keyboards
- Labels: Ingus Baušķenieka Ieraksti; MicRec
- Website: https://ingusbauskenieks.bandcamp.com

Ingus Baušķenieks (born December 30, 1956) is a Latvian musician known as a member of Dzeltenie Pastnieki and as a solo artist. He is a multi-instrumentalist, with the bass guitar being his primary instrument in band engagements. He is also known for his proficiency in home recording and tape editing.

He is the son of the renowned Latvian painter Auseklis Baušķenieks (1910–2007).

== Discography ==
Year	Album	Label
1988	Mājas dzīve: Tape only issue	
1990	Klusais Okeāns: Tape only issue	
1995	Burvju pusdienas: CD, MC	Mikrofona ieraksti
1998	Digitālā ziema: CD, MC	Studija Mix
2003	Viduslaiki: CD	Ingus Baušķenieka Ieraksti
2004	Nezināmais šedevrs: izlase 1988–2003 (Compilation): CD	Ingus Baušķenieka Ieraksti
2011	Čūska: CD, LP	Ingus Baušķenieka Ieraksti
2015	Sentiment et Mélancholie: CD	Ingus Baušķenieka Ieraksti
2019	Spoki: LP	Stroom
