= WestBam discography =

- Studio albums: 12
- Compilation albums: 1
- Singles: 63

This is the discography of German DJ WestBam.

== Albums ==
Date of Release	Title	Label	Notes
1988	Westbam	Low Spirit Recordings	
1988	Westbam In Seoul	Seorabeol Records Co.	
1989	The Cabinet	Low Spirit Recordings	Sometimes called 'The Cabinet (Of Dr. WestStein)'
1991	The Roof Is On Fire	TSR Records	
1991	A Practicing Maniac At Work	Low Spirit Recordings	
1994	Bam Bam Bam	Low Spirit Recordings	
1997	We'll Never Stop Living This Way	Low Spirit Recordings	
2002	Right On	Low Spirit Recordings	
2005	Do You Believe In The Westworld	Low Spirit Recordings	
2010	A Love Story 89-10	Kontor Records	Compilation
2013	Götterstrasse	Vertigo Berlin	Deluxe 24 track edition also released
2019	The Risky Sets!!!	No Limits Music	Limited Box also released
2021	Famous Last Songs Vol. 1	Embassy of Music	

== Singles (as Westbam) ==
=== Singles ===
Year	Single	Peak chart positions										Certifications (sales thresholds)	Album
Year	Single	GER	AUT	BEL (Vl)	FIN	FRA	IRE	NED	SWE	SWI	UK	Certifications (sales thresholds)	Album
1987	"Do It In the Mix"	—	—	—	—	—	—	—	—	—	—		Westbam
1988	"Monkey Say, Monkey Do"	—	—	—	—	—	—	—	—	—	—		Westbam
1988	"Disco Deutschland"	—	—	—	—	—	—	—	—	—	—		Westbam
1988	"Live at Leningrad"	—	—	—	—	—	—	—	—	—	—		Westbam
1989	"And Party"	33	—	—	—	—	—	—	—	—	—		The Cabinet
1989	"Cold Train"	—	—	—	—	—	—	—	—	—	—		The Cabinet
1989	"Cold Stomper"	—	—	—	—	—	—	—	—	—	—		The Roof Is on Fire
1989	"Hold Me Back"	—	—	—	—	—	—	—	—	—	78		The Roof Is on Fire
1990	"Der Bundespräsidenten-Mix / Der Pink Panther-Mix"	—	—	—	—	—	—	—	—	—	—		Singles only
1990	"No More Fucking Rock And Roll"	82	—	—	—	82	—	—	—	—	—		Singles only
1990	"Saxophone"	—	—	—	—	—	—	—	—	—	116		The Roof Is on Fire
1990	"The Roof Is on Fire"	22	—	—	—	—	—	—	—	—	58		The Roof Is on Fire
1991	"Rock the House"	—	—	—	—	—	—	—	—	—	91		Singles only
1991	"I Can't Stop"	96	—	—	—	—	—	—	—	—	—		A Practising Maniac At Work
1991	"Test the Westbam"	—	—	—	—	—	—	—	—	—	—		Single only
1992	"Let Yourself Go!"	—	—	—	—	—	—	—	—	—	—		A Practising Maniac At Work
1992	"'Found a Lover / My Life of Crime"	—	—	—	—	—	—	—	—	—	—		A Practising Maniac At Work
1992	"The Mayday Anthem"	—	—	19	—	—	—	31	—	—	—		Singles only
1992	"Forward Ever Backward Never"	—	—	—	—	—	—	—	—	—	—		Singles only
1993	"Celebration Generation"	21	—	—	9	—	27	28	27	6	48		Bam Bam Bam
1994	"Religion" (with Members of Mayday)	38	—	—	—	—	—	—	—	—	—		"Members only"
1994	"Rave Olympia (Enter the Arena)" (with Members of Mayday)	27	—	—	—	—	—	—	—	—	—		"Members only"
1994	"Wizards of the Sonic"	23	—	—	1	—	—	—	—	18	32		Bam Bam Bam
1994	"Bam Bam Bam"	41	—	—	12	—	23	—	—	—	57		Bam Bam Bam
1995	"Bostich"	35	—	—	2	—	—	—	—	27	—		Singles only
1995	"Always Music" (with Koon & Axel Stephenson)	98	—	—	—	—	—	—	—	—	51		Singles only
1996	"Born to Bang"	—	—	—	—	—	—	—	—	—	—		We'll Never Stop Living this Way
1996	"Terminator"	—	—	—	16	—	—	—	—	—	—		We'll Never Stop Living this Way
1996	"Alarm Clock"	—	—	—	—	—	—	—	—	—	—		Singles only
1996	"Heavy Mental"	—	—	—	—	—	—	—	—	—	—		Singles only
1997	"Hard Times"	11	—	—	—	—	—	—	—	47	—		We'll Never Stop Living this Way
1997	"...And More" (with Can)	—	—	—	—	—	—	—	—	—	—		Single only
1997	"Sunshine" (with Dr. Motte)	5	25	—	—	—	—	—	—	10	98		Single only
1997	"Sonic Empire" (with Members of Mayday)	1	—	—	—	—	—	—	—	—	84		We'll Never Stop Living this Way
1997	"Hanging with the Machineheads" (with Can)	—	—	—	—	—	—	—	—	—	—		We'll Never Stop Living this Way
1998	"Crash Course"	53	—	—	—	—	—	—	—	—	—		We'll Never Stop Living this Way
1998	"Agharta - The City Of Shamballa (Subterranean World)" (with Afrika Bambaataa and I.F.O.)	60	—	54	—	—	—	—	—	—	—		
1998	"Love Parade 1998 (One World One Future)" (with Dr. Motte)	6	—	—	—	—	—	—	—	15	—		Singles only
1999	"BeatBoxRocker"	13	—	—	—	—	—	—	—	—	—		Singles only
1999	"Do The Rambo / MOM" (with TL Pimps and Members of Mayday)	—	—	—	—	—	—	—	—	—	—		Singles only
2000	"Love Bass"	—	—	—	—	—	—	—	—	—	—		Singles only
2000	"Electro Remixes"	—	—	—	—	—	—	—	—	—	—		Singles only
2000	"Love Parade 2000 (One World One Love Parade)" (with Dr. Motte)	9	32	—	—	79	—	—	—	83	—		Singles only
2001	"Links 2 3 4" (vs Rammstein)	—	—	—	—	—	—	—	—	—	—		
2002	"Oldschool Baby" (with Nena Kerner)	21	—	—	—	—	—	—	—	—	—		Right On
2003	"Right On / Like Ice in the Sunshine"	—	—	—	—	—	—	—	—	—	—		Right On
2003	"Recognize" (with Mr. X)	71	—	—	—	—	—	—	—	—	—		Right On
2004	"Dancing with the Rebels" (with Afrika Islam)	69	—	—	—	—	—	—	—	—	—		
2005	"Bang the Loop"	73	—	—	—	—	—	—	—	—	—		Do You Believe in the Westworld
2005	"Orgasm"	—	—	—	—	—	—	—	—	—	—		Do You Believe in the Westworld
2006	"It's Not Easy" (with Superpitcher)	—	—	—	—	—	—	—	—	—	—		Singles only
2006	"EK Tour Loops" (with TL Pimp)	—	—	—	—	—	—	—	—	—	—		Singles only
2008	"Bass Planet"	—	—	—	—	—	—	—	—	—	—		
2010	"Don't Look Back in Anger"	—	—	—	—	—	—	—	—	—	—		
2011	"Original Hardcore" (with Moguai)	—	—	—	—	—	—	—	—	—	—		
2013	"You Need the Drugs" (with Richard Butler)	—	—	—	—	—	—	—	—	—	—		
"—" denotes releases that did not chart.

== Singles & EPs (under aliases) ==
Date of Release	Title	Label	Notes
1988	A Long Hard Dick	Low Spirit Recordings	As It's 2 Hard
1997	Neanderthal Man/Elephantism	Loud & Slow	As Mr. Y
1997	Die Dunkelsequenz	Loud & Slow	As Professor Taub-Karcher
2008	Vinyl Wunderwaffe Volume 1	LJ Recordings, Bass Planet	As WB Loops
2009	Vinyl Wunderwaffe Volume II	Bass Planet	As WB Loops
2009	Vinyl Wunderwaffe Volume III - House Party '86	Bass Planet	As WB Loops
2009	Vinyl Wunderwaffe Volume IV - Techno Rave '91	Bass Planet	As WB Loops

== Collaborations with Klaus Jankuhn ==
Date of Release	Title	Label	Notes
1985	17	Wall City Records	As Cowboy Temple. The song '17' is based on '19' by Paul Hardcastle
1990	Heavy Mental	Low Spirit Recordings	As Heavy Mental
1990	Callas	Low Spirit Recordings	Vox Mystica
1990	Alligators Have Fun	Low Spirit Recordings, Vielklang	With William Röttger, as Mr. President, Sir!
1991	This Is B.U.G.	B.U.G. Records, EFA	As Fuck The Industry And Motherfuck Radio, Man!
1991	The Plank	B.U.G. Records	As No Vocals Necessary Movement
1991	The B.U.G. EP	Rising High Records	As Fuck The Industry And Motherfuck Radio, Man! and No Vocals Necessary Movement
1991	Always High - Never Down	B.U.G. Records	As Kick Ass Project
1992	Hobby	B.U.G. Records, EFA	As Tilly Lilly
1993	I Am Ready	B.U.G. Records	As Spring & Koon
1995	Endlos	Low Spirit Recordings	As Endlos
1996	Weekend	Low Spirit UK	As T.A.F.K.A.D., with Fabian Lenz
1997	Untitled	Low Spirit UK	As Endlos, and with Beat In Time and Plutone. Limited edition
1997	Roller Coaster	Sm:)e Communications	As Tilly Lilly
1999	Genetic	Sm:)e Communications	As Tilly Lilly
2000	Weekend	Electric Kingdom	As Dicktator, also featuring Fabian Lenz
2001	You Can't Stop Us (Loveparade 2001)	Low Spirit Recordings	The Love Parade anthem for 2001, as The Love Committee
2002	Access Peace (Loveparade 2002)	Low Spirit Recordings	The Love Parade anthem for 2002, as The Love Committee
2002	Roh - Mix	Road Rage Records	As The WBs
2003	Love Rules (Love Parade 2003)	Low Spirit Recordings	The Love Parade anthem for 2003, as The Love Committee
2004	Baby's On Fire (Super Dope Underground Mixes)	Road Rage Records	As The WBs
2004	Total Extrem / Do You?	Road Rage Records	As The WBs
2009	Science	Bass Planet	As Serial Funk
2009	Serial Funk Vol. 1	Bass Planet	As Serial Funk

== Collaborations with Afrika Islam ==
Albums

Date of Release	Title	Label	Notes
1999	New World Order	Electric Kingdom	
2000	Live From Berlin - 4 Turntables And A Microphone	Electric Kingdom	Compilation

Singles

Date of Release	Title	Label
1996	Nite Of The Tschuldigungs	Hysteria
1997	Free Me	Low Spirit Recordings
1998	New World Order	Electric Kingdom
1998	What's Up At The Brother Front / 1956	Loud & Slow
1999	Viva La Revolucion	Electric Kingdom
2000	Global Players (My Name Is Techno)	Electric Kingdom
2001	Butterloops	Electric Kingdom

== Collaborations with Deskee ==
Albums

Date of Release	Title	Label	Notes
1990	No. 1 Is The Number	RCA	
1990	Dancetracks	Black Out	

Singles

Date of Release	Title	Label	Notes
1989	Let There Be House	Black Out	Reissued in 1996 and 2004
1990	Dance, Dance	Black Out	
1990	Kid Get Hyped	Black Out	
1991	Lost In The Groove	RCA	
1996	Feel The Street	Force Inc. US	With DJ Tonka
1997	Get Up (September)	Dos Or Die Recordings	With Foundation
2002	Ska Train / World Domination	Le Bien Et Le Mal	
2005	I'll House You	Black Out	

== Collaboration with The Beloved ==
Date of Release	Title	Label	Notes
2020	Sky Is The Limit	WG Records/Embassy One	Jon Marsh on Vocals

== Collaborations with other artists (as Maximilian Lenz) ==
Date of Release	Title	Label	Notes
1997	Sunshine	Low Spirit Recordings	The Love Parade anthem for 1997, with Dr. Motte
1998	Love Parade 1998 (One World One Future)	Low Spirit Recordings	The Love Parade anthem for 1998, with Dr. Motte
1998	We Are The 3 Bad Brothers From The Mothership	Electric Kingdom	With Clemens Kahlcke and Kay Lippert as 3 Bad Brothers From The Mothership
1998	Elektronische Tanzmusik	Low Spirit Recordings	With Takkyu Ishino as TakBam
1999	Music Is The Key (Love Parade 99)	Low Spirit Recordings	The Love Parade anthem for 1999, with Dr. Motte
2000	Love Parade 2000 (One World One Love Parade)	Low Spirit Recordings	The Love Parade anthem for 2000, with Dr. Motte
2001	Technomusik Ab Und Zu (Galactik Pizza Delivery Vol. 3)	Ki/oon records, Loopa	With Takkyu Ishino as TakBam
2003	Why Is Everybody 2 Loud	Low Spirit Recordings	With Kay Lippert, as Los Heroes Del Noise

Work with Members Of Mayday can be viewed here.
