= William Röttger =

German label manager, music manager and gallery owner

Wilhelm Christian "William" Röttger (1948 – 28 February 2015) was a German label owner, music manager and gallery owner. Röttger co-founded the influential German techno label Low Spirit and managed the music festival Mayday.

== Life ==
William Röttger grew up in the Westphalian village Lippborg. Since the late 1960s he was political active. In the 1970s he was scientific assistant of art teacher Otto Lenz at the Pädagogische Hochschule Westfalen-Lippe. Lenz was the father of Maximilian (WestBam) and Fabian Lenz (DJ Dick). Besides he worked as an anti-authoritarian kindergarten teacher. Röttger was also a photographer and writer for periodicals such as Informations-Dienst zur Verbreitung unterbliebener Nachrichten, the Munich Blatt and Die Tageszeitung.

He organised music events and brought musicians and bands like Einstürzende Neubauten, Killing Joke, Gang of Four, Fad Gadget, Hans-A-Plast and Deutsch-Amerikanische Freundschaft to Münster. In 1983 Röttger arranged WestBams first DJ performance in the Odeon club in Münster.

Röttger moved to Berlin in the early 1980s, where he worked as photographer and retailer. After he unsuccessfully had offered WestBams tracks to different labels, Röttger together with WestBam, DJ Dick, Klaus Jankuhn and Sandra Molzahn founded their own label Low Spirit in 1985, which became the most successful German techno label of the 1990s. Röttger fostered the careers of musicians like WestBam, DJ Dick, Marusha, RMB, Hardsequencer, Raver's Nature and Mark 'Oh. Röttger also founded the events company Mayday GmbH, which organised the annual Mayday festivals, and also was involved in the planning of the Love Parades.

In 2006 Röttger and his partners closed down Label Low Spirit and sold the rights for Mayday to the company i-Motion. Afterwards he focused on arts and founded the Berlin-based Eclectic Window Gallery.

Röttger died on 28 February 2015 of cancer, surrounded by his family.

== Discography ==
- 1990: Mr. President, Sir! – Alligators Have Fun (Low Spirit)
