= Wizards of the Sonic =

Single by WestBam

from the album Bam Bam Bam
- Released: June 17, 1994
- Length: 17:26
- Label: Urban; Low Spirit Recordings
- Producers: Klaus Jankuhn; WestBam

WestBam singles chronology
"Celebration Generation" (1993)	"Wizards of the Sonic" (1994)	"Bam Bam Bam" (1994)

"Wizards of the Sonic" is a song by German DJ WestBam. It was released in June 1994 as the second single from his sixth album, Bam Bam Bam (1994).

== Track listing ==
1. "Wizards of the Sonic" - Part 1: (Original) - 7:19
2. "Wizards of the Sonic" - Part 2: (Subliminal) - 7:02
3. "Wizards of the Sonic" - Part 3: (Radional) - 3:05

== Lista Remix ==
1. "Wizards of the Sonic" (Matt Darey Radio Edit)
2. "Wizards of the Sonic" (Matt Darey Remix)
3. "Wizards of the Sonic" (Dextrous Remix)
4. "Wizards of the Sonic" (Original Red Jerry '95 Remix)
5. "Wizards of the Sonic" (C. J. Bolland Remix)
6. "Wizards of the Sonic" (Matt Darey Dub)

== Charts ==
Chart (1994–1995)	Peak position
Finland (Suomen virallinen lista)	1
Germany (GfK)	23
Scotland Singles (OCC)	16
Switzerland (Schweizer Hitparade)	18
UK Singles (OCC)	32
UK Dance (OCC)	2
UK Pop Tip Club Chart (Music Week)	34

== See also ==
- Sonic the Hedgehog 2
