= Celebration Generation =

Single by WestBam

from the album Bam Bam Bam
- Released: December 1993
- Length: 5:26
- Label: Low Spirit Recordings
- Songwriter(s): Klaus Jankuhn, WestBam
- Producer(s): Klaus Jankuhn, WestBam

WestBam singles chronology
"Forward Ever Backward Never" (1992)	"Celebration Generation" (1993)	"Wizards of the Sonic" (1994)

"Celebration Generation" is a song by German DJ WestBam. It was released in December 1993 as the lead single from his sixth album, Bam Bam Bam (1994).

== Track listing ==
1. "Celebration Generation" (Westbam Remix) - 5:26
2. "Celebration Generation" (Ravers Nature Remix) - 5:46
3. "Celebration Generation" (RMB Remix) - 6:22

== Chart performance ==
Chart (1994)	Peak position
Finland (Suomen virallinen lista)	9
Germany (GfK)	21
Ireland (IRMA)	27
Netherlands (Dutch Top 40)	20
Sweden (Sverigetopplistan)	27
Switzerland (Schweizer Hitparade)	6
UK Singles (OCC)	48
UK Dance (OCC)	16
UK Club Chart (Music Week)	22
