= Culture Flash =

"Culture flash"

Single by Members of Mayday
- Released: 2002
- Genre: EDM
- Songwriter(s): Klaus Jankuhn, Maximilian Lenz
- Producer(s): Low Spirit Recordings, Deviant Records for 2× 12-inch

"Culture Flash" is a song and single by music project of Members of Mayday. The unofficial anthem of Mayday Festival, one of the oldest and most reputed electronic music festivals in Europe.

== Versions ==
=== Official ===
- "Culture Flash" (Original)
- "Culture Flash" (Original Extended Mix) - 9:24
- "Culture Flash" (Raw Power Mix) - 5:31
- "Culture Flash" (Drumappella) - 1:35
- "Culture Flash" (Hardy Hard Mix) - 6:58
- "Culture Flash" (Short) - 3:03

=== Unofficial ===
- "Culture Flash" (G-Kingu, short mix 2010) - 3:36
- and some other
