= Happy hardcore (disambiguation) =

Happy hardcore is a genre of hard dance music emerging around 1991–1993.

Happy hardcore may also refer to:

- Our Happy Hardcore, an album by German dance group Scooter.
- Bouncy techno, a hardcore dance music rave style that developed in the early 1990s, known as happy hardcore in the Netherlands
- Easycore, a genre fusing and merges pop-punk with elements of metalcore and hardcore punk subgenres.
