= DJ Dick =

DJ Dick may refer to:

- Fabian Lenz, German DJ, Techno musician and events producer
- Richard Whittingham, British musician and founder of Rockers Hi-Fi
