= Friends (Scooter song) =

1995 single by Scooter

Single by Scooter

from the album ... and the Beat Goes On!
- Released: 11 May 1995
- Length: 4:40
- Label: Club Tools; Scorpio Music
- Songwriters: H. P. Baxxter; Rick J. Jordan; Jens Thele; Ferris Bueller
- Producers: H. P. Baxxter; Rick J. Jordan; Jens Thele; Ferris Bueller

Scooter singles chronology
"Move Your Ass!" (1995)	"Friends" (1995)	"Endless Summer" (1995)

Music video
- "Friends" on YouTube

"Friends" is a song by German group Scooter, released in May 1995, by labels Club Tools and Scorpio Music, as the third single from their debut album, ... and the Beat Goes On! (1995). The song is notable as the first example of the band using high pitched female vocals for the chorus of a song. The band also used this on the follow-up single "Endless Summer" before abandoning it until "Posse (I Need You on the Floor)" in 2001, after which it became a staple of most Scooter singles.

The song was covered in 2009 by Klostertaler, for a Scooter tribute album. In April 2011, an updated version of the original, entitled "Friends Turbo", was released as the theme to the German release of the film New Kids Turbo.

== Critical reception ==
Pan-European magazine Music & Media wrote, "It seems like they have the exclusive rights to "novelty". After nonsensical 'Hyper Hyper' and 'Move Your Ass', you would swear that Daffy Duck has been asked to do the lead vocals."

== Music video ==
The accompanying music video for "Friends" was directed by Eric Will and filmed in Paris. It was produced by DoRo Film GmbH and A-listed on German music television channel VIVA in June 1995. "Friends" had generated more than 19 million views on YouTube as of December 2025. Will had previously directed the video for "Move Your Ass!".

The video for the release of "Friends Turbo" was filmed on location in Maaskantje.

== Track listings ==
- CD maxi - Germany (CLU 6123-5)
1. "Friends" (4:40)
2. "Friends" (Single edit) (3:47)
3. "Friends" (Ramon Zenker club remix) (5:32)
4. "Friends" (Jeyenne remix) (4:30)
- 12" maxi - Germany
1. "Friends" (4:40)
2. "Friends" (Ramon Zenker club remix) (5:32)
3. "Friends" (Jeyenne remix) (4:30)
- CD maxi - Australia
1. "Friends" (Single edit) (3:47)
2. "Friends" (Ramon Zenker club remix) (5:32)
3. "Endless Summer" (Datura remix) (4:50)
4. "Hyper Hyper" (Video edit) (3:34)
5. "Move Your Ass!" (Platinum People remix) (7:46)
6. "Friends" (4:40)
- CD maxi - France
1. "Friends" (Single edit) (3:47)
2. "Friends" (Extended) (4:40)
3. "Friends" (Ramon Zenker club remix) (5:32)
4. "Friends" (Jeyenne remix) (4:30)
- CD single - France
1. "Friends" (Single edit) (3:47)
2. "Friends" (Ramon Zenker club remix) (5:32)
- 12" maxi - France
1. "Friends" (Extended) (4:40)
2. "Friends" (Single) (3:47)
3. "Friends" (Ramon Zenker club remix) (5:32)
4. "Friends" (Jeyenne remix) (4:30)
- 12" maxi - Spain
1. "Friends" (Extended) (4:40)
2. "Friends" (Single) (3:47)
3. "Friends" (Ramon Zenker club remix) (5:32)
4. "Move Your Ass!" (Original mix) (5:50)

== Charts ==
=== Weekly charts ===
Chart (1995)	Peak position
Austria (Ö3 Austria Top 40)	15
Europe (Eurochart Hot 100)	22
Europe (European Dance Radio)	16
Germany (GfK)	3
Ireland (IRMA)	26
Israel (Israeli Singles Chart)	7
Italy (Musica e dischi)	23
Netherlands (Dutch Top 40)	24
Netherlands (Single Top 100)	38
Switzerland (Schweizer Hitparade)	15

=== Year-end charts ===
Chart (1995)	Position
Germany (Media Control)	55
Latvia (Latvijas Top 50)	40

== Certifications ==
Region	Certification	Certified units/sales
Germany (BVMI)	Gold	250,000^{^}
^{^} Shipments figures based on certification alone.
