= Spring (RMB song) =

Single by RMB

from the album Widescreen
- Released: 29 April 1996
- Length: 3:23 (Video Mix)
- Label: Urban Records

RMB singles chronology
"Passport to Heaven" (1995)	"Spring" (1996)	"Reality" (1996)

"Spring" is an English-language single by German band RMB, which was released on 29 April 1996. The song peaked at number 7 on the German singles chart.

== Track listing ==
CD maxi single
No.	Title	Length
1.	"Spring (Vocal Mix)"	6:15
2.	"Spring (Straight Mix)"	4:52
3.	"Whispering"	5:33
4.	"Spring (Video Mix)"	3:23

Vinyl maxi single
No.	Title	Length
1.	"Spring (Straight Mix)"	4:52
2.	"Spring (Microwave Prince Mix)"	4:58
3.	"Spring (Kadoc Mix)"	6:17
4.	"Spring (Vocal Mix)"	6:15

Vinyl maxi single
No.	Title	Length
1.	"Spring (Kadoc Mix)"	6:17
2.	"Spring (Microwave Prince Mix)"	4:58
3.	"Spring (Future Breeze Mix)"	9:05
4.	"Spring (Hitchhiker & Dumondt Mix)"	8:34

== Charts ==
Chart (1996–97)	Peak position
Germany (GfK)	7
Switzerland (Schweizer Hitparade)	7
Netherlands (Single Top 100)	11
Finland (Suomen virallinen lista)	18
Austria (Ö3 Austria Top 40)	22

Chart (2003)	Peak position
Hungary (Dance Top 40); Rmb feat. Talla 2XLC version	19

=== Year-end charts ===
Chart (1996)	Position
Germany (Official German Charts)	23

== Certifications ==
Region	Certification	Certified units/sales
Germany (BVMI)	Gold	250,000^{^}
^{^} Shipments figures based on certification alone.

== Release history ==
Date	Format	Label
29 April 1996	CD maxi single	Urban Records
1996	Vinyl maxi single	Max
1996	Vinyl maxi single	Low Spirit
