= Mayday (music festival) =

German electronic music festival

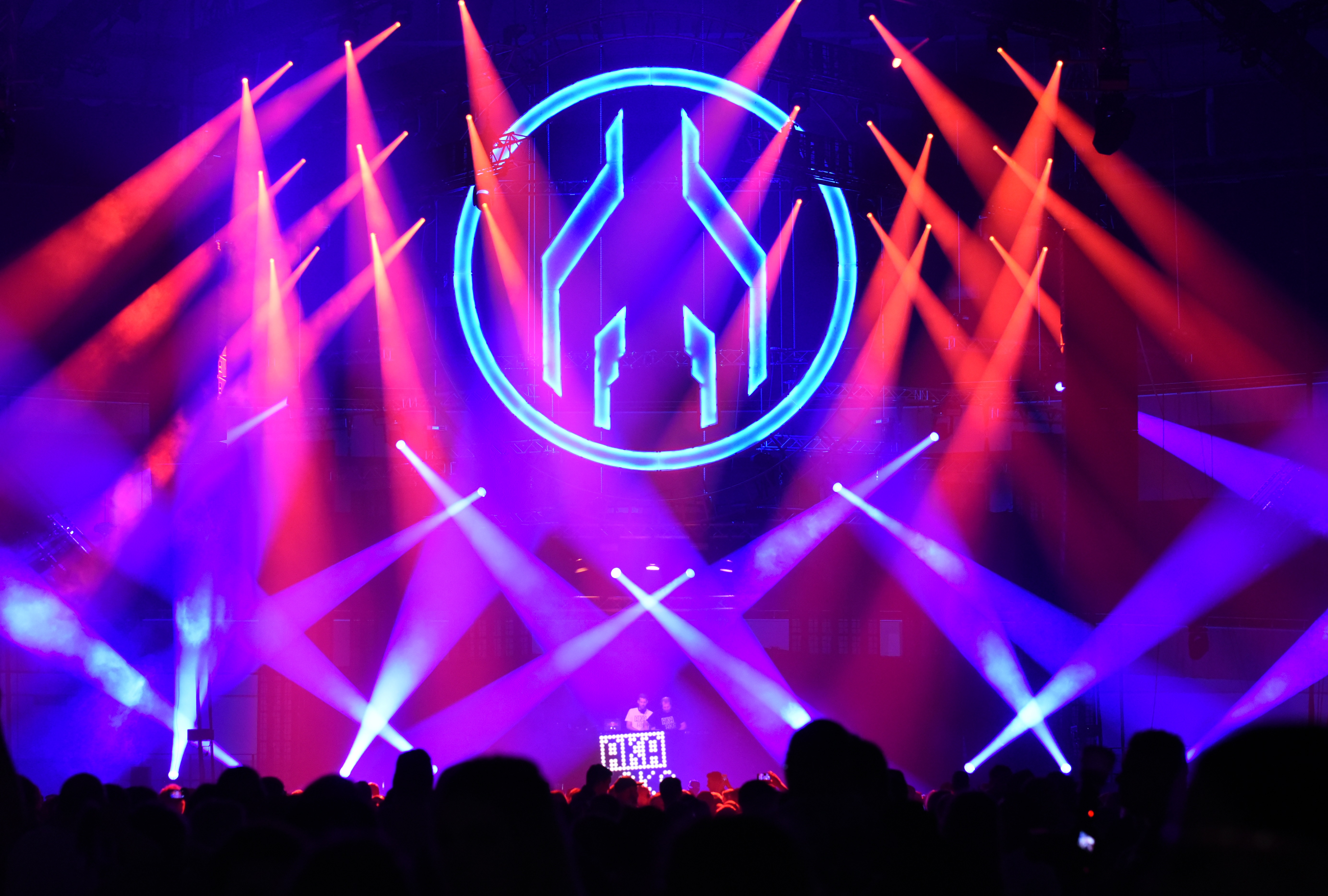
- Mayday in Dortmund, Germany, April 2019
- Genre: Electronic music
- Dates: April and December
- Locations: Germany, Poland, Hungary, Russia
- Years active: 1991–2008
- Founders: Fabian Lenz
- Website: mayday.de

Mayday is an electronic music festival that takes place in European countries, such as Germany, Poland, Hungary, and Russia.

The first event took place on 14th December 1991 in Berlin. After the collapse of the Berlin Wall, the East German youth radio station DT64 was threatened with closure from the newly formed government, as it could be connected with the former communist era. In an attempt to save it, the first German techno label Low Spirit arranged a party to raise funds from tickets. Organizers choose "Mayday" as the name for the event, which is an agreed term for calling for help or emergency in areas such as the navy or air traffic.

Nowadays, the festival is only held around April-May in Dortmund, Germany, northeast of Düsseldorf, and on 10 November in Katowice. Each Mayday has a theme. Until 2013 it was composed by Members of Mayday, DJs WestBam, and Klaus Jankuhn. Since 1998 Mayday (Germany) is supported by eve&rave Münster e.V. with drug information desks. Although it played techno music in its early days, in recent years, Mayday has opened up to new sounds, from hardstyle to house, trance, and EDM.

== List of Mayday events ==
Attendance figures are estimated.

Event name	Date	Location	Attendance	Acts
Best of House and Techno '91	1991-12-14	Berlin, Halle Weissensee	5000	18: DJs: Frank de Wulf, WestBam, Sven Väth, Dick, Rok, Tanith, Dave Angel, Moneypenny, Sascha, Marusha, Mate Galic, Neutron 9000, Pure Energy; Live Acts: Ravesignal, Speedy J, Mental Overdrive, The Hypnotist
A New Chapter of House and Techno	1992-04-30	Cologne, Eis- und Schwimmstadion	12000	
Forward Ever, Backward Never	1992-12-12	Berlin, Halle Weissensee	7000	21
The Judgement Day	1993-04-30	Dortmund, Westfalenhallen	16000	29
The Religion	1993-12-11	Berlin, Halle Weissensee	6000	21
Rave Olympia	1994-04-30	Dortmund, Westfalenhallen	24000	33
The Raving Society (We Are Different)	1994-11-25; 1994-11-26	Berlin, Deutschlandhalle	32000	22
Reformation	1995-04-30	Dortmund, Westfalenhallen	22000	34
The Great Coalition	1995-12-16	Frankfurt, Festhalle	18000	40
The Day X	1996-04-30	Dortmund, Westfalenhallen	20000	47
Life on Mars	1996-12-14	Berlin	8000	26
Sonic Empire	1997-04-30	Dortmund, Westfalenhallen	18000	42
Save the Robots	1998-04-30	Dortmund, Westfalenhallen	20000	35
Soundtropolis	1999-04-30	Dortmund, Westfalenhallen	20000	37
Datapop	2000-04-30	Dortmund, Westfalenhallen	20000	37
Mayday Polska	2000-11-10	Katowice	9000	19
10 in 01	2001-04-30	Dortmund, Westfalenhallen	20000	38
Culture Flash	2002-04-	Dortmund, Westfalenhallen	20000	37
Mayday comes to Budapest	2002	Budapest		
Password Europe	2003-03-29	Budapest, Hungexpo	9000	50
Troopa of Tomorrow	2003-04-30	Dortmund, Westfalenhallen	17000	42
Future Downloaded	2004-04-03	Budapest	10000	70
Team X-Treme	2004-04-30	Dortmund, Westfalenhallen	20000	38
U Make The Rules, We Make The Noise	2005-03-26	Budapest, Hungexpo F-F2	11000	
Prototypes	2005-04-30	Dortmund, Westfalenhallen	20000	40
Power Recycling	2006-03-18	Budapest		
Worldclub	2006-04-30	Dortmund, Westfalenhallen	20000	35
New Euphoria	2007-04-30	Dortmund, Westfalenhallen	20000	70
Reflect Yourself	2008-04-30	Dortmund, Westfalenhallen	25000	50
Massive Moments	2009-04-30	Dortmund, Westfalenhallen	25000	
Massive Moments	2009-06-13	Budapest, Óbuda Island		80

== Gallery ==
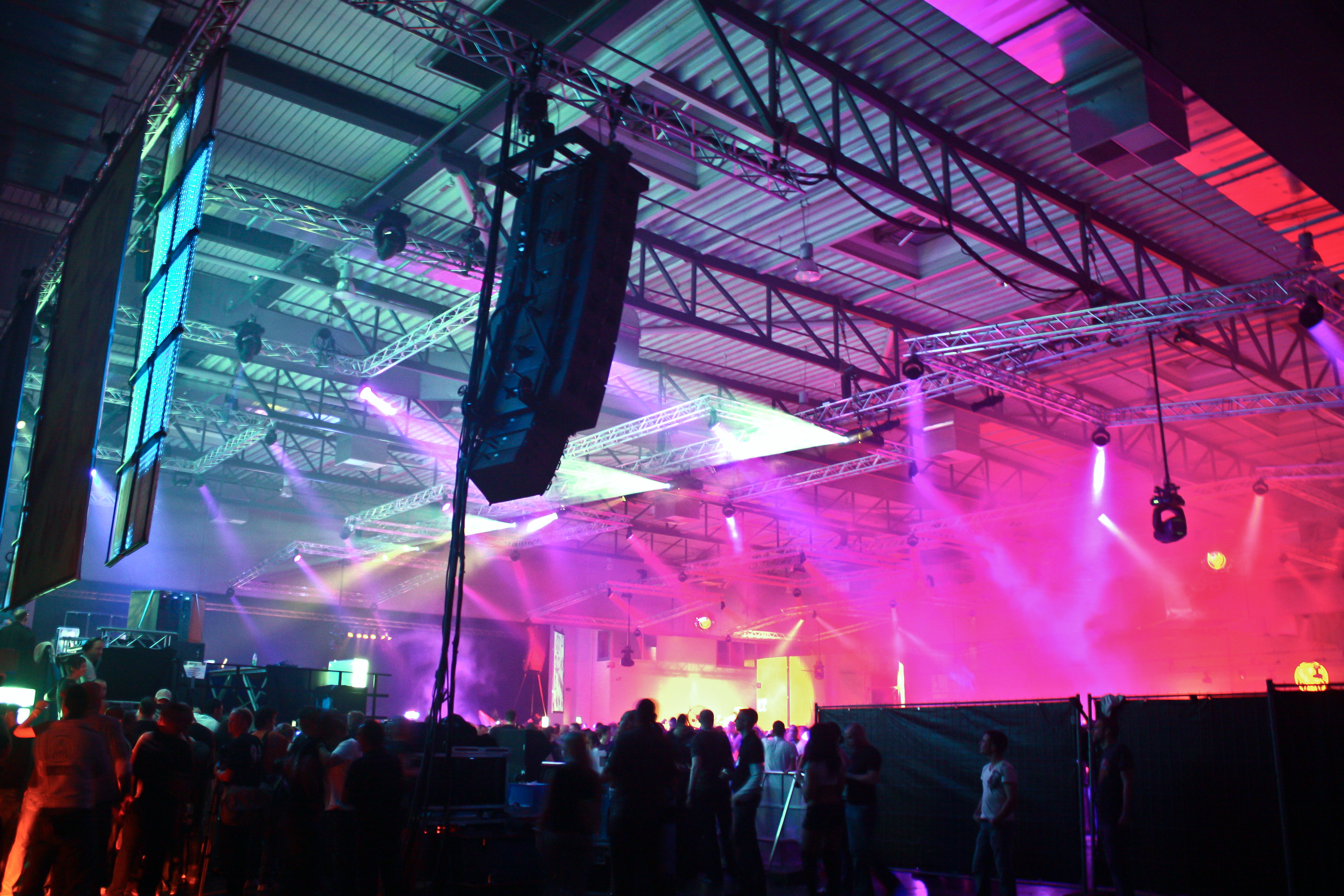
Mayday 2009

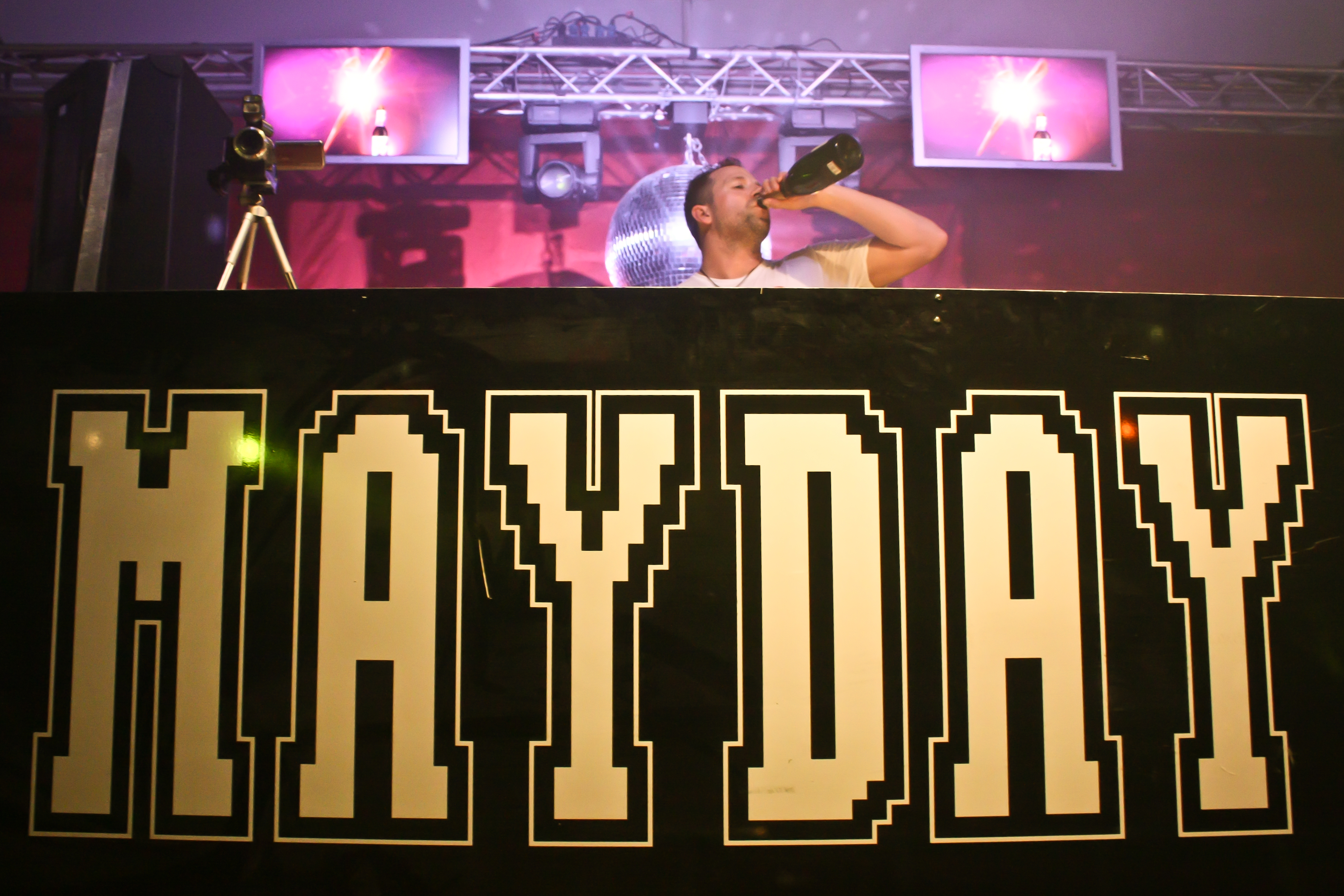
Tom Novy at Mayday 2009

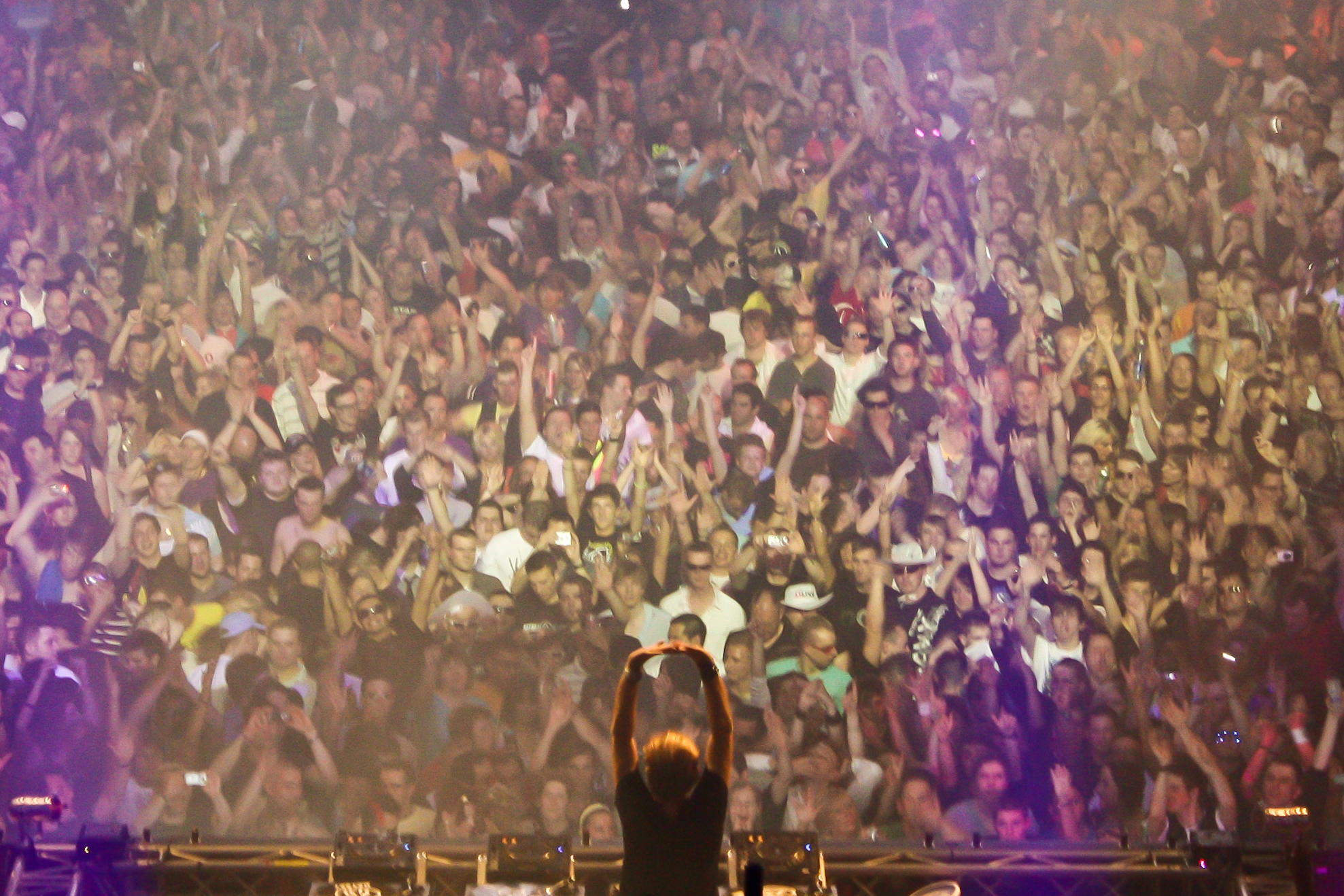
Sven Väth at Mayday 2009

== See also ==
- List of electronic music festivals
- Culture Flash
