= ... and the Beat Goes On! =

...and the Beat Goes On!

Studio album by Scooter
- Released: January 31, 1995
- Recorded: 1994–1995
- Studios: The Ambience Studio, Germany
- Length: 58:25
- Label: Club Tools
- Producer: The Loop!

Scooter chronology
...and the Beat Goes On! (1995)	Our Happy Hardcore (1996)

Singles from ...and the Beat Goes On!
- 1. "Hyper Hyper" Released: 26 May 1994; 2. "Move Your Ass!" Released: 27 January 1995; 3. "Friends" Released: 11 May 1995; 4. "Endless Summer" Released: 24 July 1995

...and the Beat Goes On! is the debut studio album by German band Scooter. Four singles were released from it: "Hyper Hyper", "Move Your Ass!", "Friends" and "Endless Summer".

== Production ==
After the success of the single "Hyper Hyper", Scooter decided to make their debut album. Released in early 1995, it contains brand new tracks and reworked "The Loop!"-remixes. There are no gaps between the tracks, it sounds like an imaginary Scooter gig (on the LP release, however, all tracks are unmixed and 7 tracks, not released as singles, are even without the crowd noises).

The album was re-released in 2013 in the "20 Years of Hardcore Expanded Edition" series. This version contains 3 CDs: the first is the digitally remastered original album; the other two contain the singles, B-sides, live recordings, and remixes related to the album.

The album was re-released on LP on 31 January 2020 to coincide with the 25th anniversary of the album's release. It was re-released on yellow LP on 12 June of the following year for Record Store Day, limited to 500 copies.

== Track listing ==
All tracks are written by H.P. Baxxter, Rick J. Jordan, Jens Thele, and Ferris Bueller.

No.	Title	Length
1.	"Different Reality"	5:33
2.	"Move Your Ass!"	5:38
3.	"Waiting for Spring"	4:28
4.	"Endless Summer"	4:04
5.	"Cosmos"	6:06
6.	"Rhapsody in E"	6:02
7.	"Hyper Hyper"	5:00
8.	"Raving in Mexico"	6:05
9.	"Beautiful Vibes"	5:13
10.	"Friends"	5:10
11.	"Faster Harder Scooter"	5:06

Notes

- "Waiting for Spring" is based on The Loop!'s remix of the 1994 single "Parade" by Community Featuring Fonda Rae, entitled "Parade (Waiting 4 Spring)". The Loop! was composed of H.P. Baxxter, Rick J. Jordan and Ferris Bueller before they became Scooter.
- "Hyper Hyper" takes elements from Scottish group Ultra-Sonic's 1993 song "Annihilating Rhythm", much to Ultra-Sonic's chagrin.
- "Faster Harder Scooter" is a different track than "FasterHarderScooter" from the 1999 album "Back to the Heavyweight Jam".

== Charts ==
Chart (1995)	Peak position
Austrian Albums (Ö3 Austria)	27
German Albums (Offizielle Top 100)	25
Dutch Albums (Album Top 100)	31
Norwegian Albums (VG-lista)	18
Swiss Albums (Schweizer Hitparade)	29
