= Move Your Ass! =

Single by Scooter

from the album ... and the Beat Goes On!
- B-side: "Back in Time"
- Released: 27 January 1995
- Genre: Acid techno; rave
- Length: 5:38
- Label: Club Tools
- Songwriters: H. P. Baxxter; Rick J. Jordan; Jens Thele; Ferris Bueller
- Producers: H. P. Baxxter; Rick J. Jordan; Jens Thele; Ferris Bueller

Scooter singles chronology
"Hyper Hyper" (1994)	"Move Your Ass!" (1995)	"Friends" (1995)

Music video
- "Move Your Ass!" on YouTube

"Move Your Ass!" is a song by German band Scooter, released in January 1995, by Club Tools, as the second single from their first studio album, ...and the Beat Goes On! (1995). In October of the same year, a Move Your Ass EP was marketed in the United Kingdom and Ireland. This rave song was a hit in countries such as Austria, the Netherlands, Germany, Norway, Sweden and Switzerland where it reached the top ten. In France, the song reached number 11.

"Move Your Ass" was the introduction to Scooter in the UK, being the first of their many releases to enter the UK top 40. It was first released there on 1 April 1995, but it stalled at number 98 on the chart before dropping out of the top 100 altogether. It saw a re-release on 21 October 1995, when it entered the UK top 40 and peaked at number 23. It remained in the UK top 100 for four weeks.

== Critical reception ==
James Masterton for Dotmusic named "Move Your Ass!" as a "startlingly retrospective-sounding acid track". Pan-European magazine Music & Media commented, "Vrrrrrroooooommmmmmmm!!!!! There goes the Vespa again to deliver the follow-up to novelty hit 'Hyper Hyper'. Once more the unchanged winning team performs in a fake live show setting." James Hamilton from Music Week's RM Dance Update described it as a "rabble rousing phonetic exhortations shouted surging fantastically frantic 0–160 3-0bpm raver from Germany".

== Music video ==
The accompanying music video for "Move Your Ass!" was directed by Eric Will. It was A-listed on German music television channel VIVA in February 1995. Nine months later, the video was a Box Top on British The Box for four weeks in November.

== Track listings ==
=== Original version ===
- CD single – France
1. "Move Your Ass!" (Video edit) – 3:55
2. "Move Your Ass!" – 5:50
- CD maxi – Germany and France (CLU 6090–5)
1. "Move Your Ass!" (Video edit) – 3:58
2. "Move Your Ass!" – 5:50
3. "Back in Time" – 7:04

=== Remixes ===
- CD maxi – Australia
1. "Move Your Ass!" (Video edit) – 4:00
2. "Move Your Ass!" (Ultra-sonic remix) – 7:16
3. "Move Your Ass!" (Mandala remix) – 6:28
4. "Move Your Ass!" (Para-dizer remix) – 3:22
5. "Move Your Ass!" (Alien Factory remix) – 5:33
6. "Move Your Ass!" (Mega 'lo mania-acid mania mix) – 5:49
7. "Move Your Ass!" (Men Behind remix) – 5:54
- CD maxi – Germany (CLU 6105–5)
1. "Move Your Ass!" (Ultra-sonic remix) – 7:15
2. "Move Your Ass!" (Mandala remix) – 6:23
3. "Move Your Ass!" (para-dizer remix) – 3:22
4. "Move Your Ass!" (Alien Factory remix) – 5:30
5. "Move Your Ass!" (Mega 'lo mania-acid mania mix) – 5:48
6. "Move Your Ass!" (Men Behind remix) – 5:56
7. "Move Your Ass!" (Matiz remix) – 5:26
- 2×12-inch maxi – Germany (CLU 6105–0)
1. "Move Your Ass!" (Mandala remix) – 6:27
2. "Move Your Ass!" (Mega 'lo mania-acid mania mix) – 8:02
3. "Move Your Ass!" (Ultra-sonic remix) – 7:15
4. "Move Your Ass!" (Mega 'lo mania-trance dub mix) – 8:23
5. "Move Your Ass!" (Para-dizer remix) – 6:59
6. "Move Your Ass!" (Men Behind remix) – 5:56
7. "Move Your Ass!" (Alien Factory remix) – 5:31
8. "Move Your Ass!" (Matiz remix) – 5:26

=== EP ===
- CD maxi – UK
1. "Move Your Ass!" (Video edit) – 3:55
2. "Friends" – 4:40
3. "Endless Summer" (Radio edit) – 3:55
4. "Move Your Ass!" (Platinum People remix) – 7:46
- 12-inch maxi – UK
1. "Move Your Ass!" – 5:50
2. "Friends" (Ramon Zenker club mix) – 5:32
3. "Endless Summer" (Maxi version) – 5:14
4. "Move Your Ass!" (Platinum People remix) – 7:46
- Cassette – UK
1. "Move Your Ass!" (Video edit) – 3:55
2. "Endless Summer" (Radio edit) – 3:55
3. "Move Your Ass!" (Video edit) – 3:55
4. "Endless Summer" (Radio edit) – 3:55

== Charts ==
=== Weekly charts ===
Weekly chart performance for "Move Your Ass!"
Chart (1995)	Peak position
Austria (Ö3 Austria Top 40)	3
Belgium (Ultratop 50 Flanders)	16
Belgium (Ultratop 50 Wallonia)	16
Denmark (IFPI)	12
Europe (Eurochart Hot 100)	4
Europe (European Dance Radio)	3
Finland (Suomen virallinen lista)	7
France (SNEP)	11
Germany (GfK)	3
Ireland (IRMA)	15
Italy (Musica e dischi)	5
Netherlands (Dutch Top 40)	4
Netherlands (Single Top 100)	5
Norway (VG-lista)	6
Scottish Singles Sales (Official Charts) The Move Your Ass E.P.	8
Spain (AFYVE)	18
Sweden (Sverigetopplistan)	10
Switzerland (Schweizer Hitparade)	3
UK Singles (Official Charts) The Move Your Ass E.P.	23
UK Dance (OCC) The Move Your Ass E.P.	16
UK Indie (Music Week)	1
UK Pop Tip Club Chart (Music Week)	22

Chart (1996)	Peak position
UK Dance (OCC) The Move Your Ass E.P.	40

=== Year-end charts ===
Year-end chart performance for "Move Your Ass!"
Chart (1995)	Position
Austria (Ö3 Austria Top 40)	20
Belgium (Ultratop 50 Flanders)	98
Belgium (Ultratop 50 Wallonia)	80
Europe (Eurochart Hot 100)	39
France (SNEP)	74
Germany (Media Control)	56
Latvia (Latvijas Top 50)	71
Netherlands (Dutch Top 40)	64
Netherlands (Single Top 100)	65
Sweden (Topplistan)	76
Switzerland (Schweizer Hitparade)	30

== Certifications ==
Certifications and sales for "Move Your Ass!"
Region	Certification	Certified units/sales
Germany (BVMI)	Gold	250,000^{^}
^{^} Shipments figures based on certification alone.

== Release history ==
Region	Date	Format(s)	Label(s)	Ref.
Germany	27 January 1995	12-inch vinyl; CD	Club Tools	
United Kingdom	20 March 1995	12-inch vinyl; CD; cassette	Club Tools	
Australia	31 July 1995	12-inch vinyl; CD	Addiction	
