= Back in the U.K. =

1995 single by Scooter

Single by Scooter

from the album Our Happy Hardcore
- B-side: "Unity Without Words Part II"; "Crank It Up"
- Released: 14 November 1995
- Recorded: 1995
- Genre: Happy hardcore; techno-pop
- Length: 3:25
- Label: Club Tools; Scorpio Music
- Songwriters: H.P. Baxxter; Rick J. Jordan; Ron Goodwin; Jens Thele; Ferris Bueller
- Producers: H.P. Baxxter; Rick J. Jordan; Jens Thele; Ferris Bueller

Scooter singles chronology
"Endless Summer" (1995)	"Back in the U.K." (1995)	"Let Me Be Your Valentine" (1996)

Music video
- "Back in the U.K." on YouTube

"Back in the U.K." is a song by German group Scooter. It was released in November 1995, by Club Tools and Scorpio Music, as the lead single from their second album, Our Happy Hardcore (1996). In the United Kingdom it became their biggest hit ever up to that point, entering at number 18 in the UK Singles Chart in February 1996. It would remain their highest-charting single until the release of "The Logical Song" in 2002, which reached number two. The song was re-recorded as "Back in Ireland" for the Irish market. The accompanying music video, directed by Rainer Thieding, was A-listed on German music television channel VIVA in December 1995. It was produced by Chopstick Films and filmed in Hamburg, Germany.

== Samples ==
- "Back in the U.K." samples the theme tune of the British film series Miss Marple, originally composed by Ron Goodwin.
- A remixed version of "Crank it Up" is used in the Da Ali G Show as Brüno's (played by Sacha Baron Cohen) intro song.

== Critical reception ==
Jennifer Nine from Melody Maker said, "A Union Jack-bedecked sleeve houses a hysterically nosebleed-speed Nintendo game theme, with added stadium-crowd roars and what sounds like miniature steel drums played by demented midgets." Pan-European magazine Music & Media wrote, "These three Anglophile ravers from Hamburg have a taste for fast and loud techno. Their driving sound and catchy melodies nail down the listener like an out of control steamroller." Music Week gave the song three out of five, adding, "A riff that sounds like 'You Are My Sunshine' and rabble rousing singing gives this German four-piece's latest track some personality. Otherwise, it's the sort of frantic technopop that gets lapped up on the Continent but engenders a lukewarm response in the UK."

== Track listings ==
=== Original version ===
- CD maxi – Germany (CLU 6195–5)
1. "Back in the U.K." (Long version) – 5:24
2. "Back in the U.K." (Radio Version) – 3:25
3. "Unity Without Words Part II" – 5:28 (misprinted as 6:28)
4. "Crank It Up" – 4:08
- CD maxi – Back in Ireland (CLU 6220–5)
1. "Back in Ireland" (Long version) – 5:24
2. "Back in Ireland" (Radio Version) – 3:49 (misprinted as 3:25)
3. "Unity Without Words Part II" – 5:28 (misprinted as 6:28)
4. "Crank It Up" – 4:08
- 12-inch maxi – Germany
1. "Back in the U.K." (Long version) – 5:24
2. "Unity Without Words Part II" – 6:28
3. "Crank It Up" – 4:08
- Cassette single – Germany
1. "Back in the U.K." (Radio version) – 3:24
2. "Crank It Up" – 4:08
- CD maxi – Australia
1. "Back in the U.K." (Long version) – 5:24
2. "Back in the U.K." (Radio Version) – 3:25
3. "Unity Without Words Part II" – 5:28 (misprinted as 6:28)
4. "Crank It Up" – 4:08
5. "Back in the U.K." (Tom Wilson Remix) – 5:49
6. "Back in the Kellys Mix" (Paddy Frazer mix) – 6:44
- CD single – France
1. "Back in the U.K." (Radio Version) – 3:25
2. "Back in the U.K." (Long version) – 5:24

=== Remixes ===
- CD maxi – Germany (CLU 6222–5)
1. "Back in the U.K." (Tom Wilson Remix) – 5:49
2. "Back in Villabajo" – 5:58
3. "Back in the U.K." (Double M's Bassss Mix) – 7:13
4. "Back in the Kellys Mix" (Paddy Frazer Mix) – 6:44
5. "Back in the U.K." (Double M's Bassss Dub Mix) – 7:13
- CD maxi – France
1. "Back in the U.K." (Tom Wilson Remix) – 5:49
2. "Back in the Kellys Mix" (Paddy Frazer Mix) – 6:44
3. "Back in the U.K." (Double M's Bassss Dub Mix) – 7:13
- 12-inch maxi – Germany
1. "Back in the U.K." (Tom Wilson Remix) – 5:49
2. "Back in Villabajo" – 5:58
3. "Back in the Kellys Mix" (Paddy Frazer Mix) – 6:44
4. "Back in the U.K." (Double M's Bassss Dub Mix) – 7:13

== Charts ==
=== Weekly charts ===
Chart (1995–1996)	Peak position
Austria (Ö3 Austria Top 40)	8
Finland (Suomen virallinen lista)	17
France (SNEP)	48
Germany (GfK)	4
Netherlands (Dutch Top 40)	27
Netherlands (Single Top 100)	29
Sweden (Sverigetopplistan)	39
Switzerland (Schweizer Hitparade)	39
UK Singles (Official Charts)	18

=== Year-end charts ===
Chart (1996)	Position
Germany (Media Control)	59

== Certifications ==
Region	Certification	Certified units/sales
Germany (BVMI)	Gold	250,000^{^}
^{^} Shipments figures based on certification alone.
