= Rebel Yell (song) =

1983 song by Billy Idol

Single by Billy Idol

from the album Rebel Yell
- B-side: "Crank Call"
- Released: 12 January 1984
- Studio: Studio A, Electric Lady (New York City)
- Genre: New wave; hard rock
- Length: 4:47 (album version); 3:43 (7-inch version)
- Label: Chrysalis
- Songwriters: Billy Idol; Steve Stevens
- Producer: Keith Forsey

Billy Idol singles chronology
"White Wedding" (1982)	"Rebel Yell" (1984)	"Eyes Without a Face" (1984)

Audio sample
- file; help

Music video
- "Rebel Yell" on YouTube

"Rebel Yell" is a song by the English rock singer Billy Idol. It is the title track of his second studio album Rebel Yell (1983), and was released as the album's lead single in January 1984 by Chrysalis Records. Initially, it only reached No. 62 in the UK and No. 46 in the US upon its release. However, a 1985 re-issue proved to be a big hit, peaking at no. 6 in the UK. The song received wide critical acclaim and in 2009 was named the 79th best hard rock song of all time by VH1 based on a public vote.

== Composition and lyrics ==
At a televised performance of VH1 Storytellers, Idol said that he had attended an event where Mick Jagger, Keith Richards, and Ronnie Wood of The Rolling Stones were taking swigs from a bottle of "Rebel Yell" bourbon whiskey. He was not familiar with the brand, but he liked the name and decided to write the song.

The song was co-written by guitarist Steve Stevens. The instrumental introduction, which sounds like a combination of electric guitar and electronic keyboard, is performed by Stevens on guitar alone, who intended it to sound this way. Stevens states that he was inspired by acoustic guitarist Leo Kottke's style.

== Reception ==
In 1984, music magazine Cash Box wrote that the song "combines the tough swagger and high-powered drive of 'White Wedding' with the decadent dance focus of 'Dancing With Myself.'"

“Rebel Yell” also garnered Idol his first Grammy nomination for Best Male Rock Vocal Performance at the 27th Annual Grammy Awards.

The song was also adopted by English Association football club Worthing F.C. as an official anthem. Idol went to secondary school in the town of Worthing, and with one of Worthing F.C.'s nicknames also being "the Rebels", prompting the decision to affiliate.

== Formats and track listings ==
- UK 7-inch vinyl single
1. "Rebel Yell"
2. "Crank Call"
- UK 12" vinyl single
1. "Rebel Yell"
2. "Crank Call"
3. "White Wedding"
- (1985 re-issue) UK 7-inch vinyl single
1. "Rebel Yell"
2. "(Do Not) Stand in the Shadows♱"

♱Recorded live at Hollywood Palladium Los Angeles, California, March 1984.

- (1985 re-issue) UK 12-inch vinyl single
1. "Rebel Yell (Extended Version)"
2. "(Do Not) Stand in the Shadows♱"
3. "Blue Highway♱"

♱Recorded live at Hollywood Palladium Los Angeles, California, March 1984.

== Charts ==
=== Weekly charts ===
Chart (1984)	Peak position
Australia (Kent Music Report)	7
Canada Top Singles (RPM)	10
New Zealand (NZ Singles Chart)	3
UK Singles (Official Charts)	62
US Billboard Hot 100	46
US Mainstream Rock (Billboard)	9
US Cash Box Top 100	29

Chart (1985)	Peak position
UK Singles (OCC)	6^{2}

Notes:

- ^{1} – Original release in 1984
- ^{2} – Re-release in 1985

=== Year-end charts ===
Chart (1984)	Position
Australia (Kent Music Report)	35
Canada Top Singles (RPM)	95

== Certifications ==
Region	Certification	Certified units/sales
Germany (BVMI)	Gold	300,000^{‡}
New Zealand (RMNZ)	2× Platinum	60,000^{‡}
United Kingdom (BPI)	Gold	400,000^{‡}
^{‡} Sales+streaming figures based on certification alone.

== Other versions ==
In 1994, Idol released the single "Speed", a song from the box office hit film of the same name, with a live acoustic version of "Rebel Yell" accompanying the lead song on the UK CD single release.

Idol performed the track live with Miley Cyrus at the 2016 iHeart Festival.

== In popular culture ==
"Rebel Yell" has been covered by many different bands such as The Dillinger Escape Plan, Children of Bodom, HIM, Drowning Pool, Scooter, Dope, Black Veil Brides, Adrenaline Mob, Bullets and Octane, Otherwise, Kill Hannah, Blue Stahli, and Queensrÿche. It was referenced in Against Me!'s 2007 song "Thrash Unreal" ("she can still hear that rebel yell just as loud as it was in 1983").

The song appears in a cassette tape in the video game Metal Gear Solid V: The Phantom Pain and can be heard during gameplay.

The song is featured in the video games WWE 2K16, BandFuse: Rock Legends and Guitar Hero World Tour, as well as in Rock Band 2 as downloadable content.

The song was parodied in a 1985 Sesame Street segment entitled "Rebel L" directed by Jon Stone, with Billy Idle (an Idol-lookalike Muppet) lying in his bedroom one night when he's awakened by a little rebellious letter L dancing and singing on his front lawn until the police arrive to stop it from disturbing the peace, which Idle and the officers end up singing and dancing along with. The song also appeared on Sesame Street compilation albums; 1993's Sesame Road, Volume 1 and the 2014 digital album Lyrical Letters.

The music video of "Rebel Yell" appeared in the 1988 film Big starring Tom Hanks.

== Scooter version ==
"Rebel Yell"

Single by Scooter

from the album Our Happy Hardcore
- B-side: "Euphoria"
- Released: 9 May 1996
- Length: 3:40
- Label: Club Tools
- Songwriters: Billy Idol; Steve Stevens
- Producers: H. P. Baxxter; Rick J. Jordan; Jens Thele; Ferris Bueller

Scooter singles chronology
"Let Me Be Your Valentine" (1996)	"Rebel Yell" (1996)	"I'm Raving" (1996)

Music video
- "Rebel Yell" on YouTube

In 1996, "Rebel Yell" was covered by German dance music band Scooter, released on 9 May by the labels Club Tools and Scorpio Music as the third single of their second album, Our Happy Hardcore (1996). It was produced by the band and became a top-10 hit in Austria, Canada, Finland, Germany and the Netherlands. In the UK, the song reached number 30 on the UK Singles Chart. The B-side is the track "Euphoria". The accompanying music video was directed by Rainer Thieding and filmed in Prague, the Czech Republic. It was produced by Chopstick Films.

=== Critical reception ===
Daniel Booth from Melody Maker wrote, "Scooter subvert the reverence of rock and the pomposity of heavy metal, then shatter them in the blink of a maquillaged eye. This, unless you're asleep at the back, you'll realise is Billy Idol's 'Rebel Yell', technofied and amplified into dance oblivion. It is incessant and addictive, exhilarating and infectious, just like those Europopped-up versions of 'Smells Like Teen Spirit', 'Wonderwall' and (sodding) 'Zombie'."

=== Track listings ===
- CD-maxi – Germany
1. "Rebel Yell" (radio edit) (3:40)
2. "Rebel Yell" (extended mix) (4:44)
3. "Euphoria" (3:57)
- 12-inch-maxi – Germany
1. "Rebel Yell" (extended mix) (4:44)
2. "Stuttgart (4:52)
3. "Euphoria" (3:57)
- Cassette single - Germany
1. "Rebel Yell" (radio edit) (3:40)
2. "Euphoria" (3:57)
- CD-single – France
1. "Rebel Yell" (radio edit) (3:40)
2. "Euphoria" (3:57)
- 12-maxi – France
1. "Rebel Yell" (extended mix) (4:44)
2. "Rebel Yell" (radio edit) (3:40)
3. "Euphoria" (3:57)
- CD-maxi – Australia
1. "Rebel Yell" (radio edit) (3:40)
2. "Let Me Be Your Valentine" (edit) (3:47)
3. "Rebel Yell" (extended mix) (4:44)
4. "Euphoria" (3:57)
5. "Let Me Be Your Valentine" (The Complete Work) (5:42)
6. "Eternity" (5:19)
7. "The Silence of T.1210 MKII" (1:31)

=== Charts ===
==== Weekly charts ====
Chart (1996)	Peak position
Austria (Ö3 Austria Top 40)	7
Finland (Suomen virallinen lista)	8
Germany (GfK)	8
Ireland (IRMA)	23
Israel (Israeli Singles Chart)	7
Netherlands (Dutch Top 40 Tipparade)	17
Netherlands (Single Top 100 Tipparade)	10
Scottish Singles Sales (Official Charts)	8
Sweden (Sverigetopplistan)	42
Switzerland (Schweizer Hitparade)	17
UK Singles (Official Charts)	30

==== Year-end charts ====
Chart (1996)	Position
Germany (Media Control)	83

== See also ==
- Rebel yell
