= Let Me Be Your Valentine =

Single by Scooter

from the album Our Happy Hardcore
- B-side: "Eternity", "The Silence of T. 1210 MKII"
- Released: 29 February 1996
- Recorded: 1995–1996
- Genre: Happy hardcore
- Length: 3:47
- Label: Club Tools
- Songwriters: H.P. Baxxter; Rick J. Jordan; Jens Thele; Ferris Bueller
- Producers: H.P. Baxxter; Rick J. Jordan; Jens Thele; Ferris Bueller

Scooter singles chronology
"Back in the U.K." (1995)	"Let Me Be Your Valentine" (1996)	"Rebel Yell" (1996)

Music video
- "Let Me Be Your Valentine" on YouTube

"Let Me be Your Valentine" is a song by German hard dance band Scooter, released on 29 February 1996, by label Club Tools, as the second single from their second album, Our Happy Hardcore (1996). The song is both written and produced by the band. It became a top-10 hit in Austria, a top-20 hit in Germany and Ireland, and a top-30 hit in Switzerland. The accompanying music video was directed by Russell Curtis and filmed in London, the UK.

== Track listings ==
=== Original version ===
- CD maxi
1. "Let Me be Your Valentine" (The Complete Work) – 5:42
2. "Let Me be Your Valentine" (Edit) – 3:47
3. "Eternity" – 5:19
4. "The Silence of T. 1210 MK II" – 1:31

=== Remixes ===
- CD maxi
1. "Let Me be Your Valentine" (Commander Tom Remix) (8:04)
2. "Let Me be Your Valentine" (Itty-Bitty-Boozy-Woozy's Blue Mega Blast) (6:23)
3. "Let Me be Your Valentine" (Simon & Shahin Remix) (5:21)

== Charts ==
Chart (1996)	Peak position
Austria (Ö3 Austria Top 40)	9
France (SNEP)	45
Germany (GfK)	14
Ireland (IRMA)	19
Netherlands (Dutch Top 40 Tipparade)	21
Netherlands (Dutch Single Tip)	8
Switzerland (Schweizer Hitparade)	23
