= Endless Summer (Scooter song) =

1995 single by Scooter

Single by Scooter

from the album ... and the Beat Goes On!
- B-side: "Across the Sky"
- Released: 24 July 1995
- Length: 5:14
- Label: Club Tools; Scorpio Music
- Songwriters: H. P. Baxxter; Rick J. Jordan; Jens Thele; Ferris Bueller
- Producers: H. P. Baxxter; Rick J. Jordan; Jens Thele; Ferris Bueller

Scooter singles chronology
"Friends" (1995)	"Endless Summer" (1995)	"Back in the U.K." (1995)

Music video
- "Endless Summer" on YouTube

"Endless Summer" is a song by German happy hardcore, rave and techno music band Scooter, released in July 1995, by Club Tools and Scorpio Music, as the fourth and final single from their debut album, ... and the Beat Goes On! (1995). The song became a top-10 hit in Germany and Spain, and a top-20 hit in Austria, Finland and Switzerland. The accompanying music video was directed by Eric Will. It was A-listed on German music television channel VIVA in September 1995.

== Track listings ==
- CD maxi – Germany (CLU 6142-5)
1. "Endless Summer" (Maxi version)(5:14)
2. "Endless Summer" (Radio edit) (3:55)
3. "Across the Sky" (5:44)
- 12-inch maxi – Germany
1. "Endless Summer" (Maxi version) (5:14)
2. "Across the Sky" (5:44)
- CD maxi – Australia
1. "Endless Summer" (Maxi version) (5:14)
2. "Endless Summer" (Radio edit) (3:55)
3. "Across the Sky" (5:44)
4. "Back in Time" (7:04)
- CD single – France
1. "Endless Summer" (Radio edit) (3:55)
2. "Across the Sky" (5:44)
- 12-inch maxi – Spain
1. "Endless Summer" (Spanish version) (5:10)
2. "Endless Summer" (English version) (5:14)
3. "Across the Sky" (5:44)

== Charts ==
=== Weekly charts ===
Chart (1995)	Peak position
Austria (Ö3 Austria Top 40)	18
Finland (Suomen virallinen lista)	13
France (SNEP)	48
Germany (GfK)	5
Italy (Musica e dischi)	24
Netherlands (Dutch Top 40)	35
Netherlands (Single Top 100)	36
Spain (AFYVE)	8
Switzerland (Schweizer Hitparade)	11

=== Year-end charts ===
Chart (1995)	Position
Germany (Media Control)	70
Latvia (Latvijas Top 50)	193

== Certifications ==
Country	Certification	Date	Sales certified
Germany	Gold	1995	250,000 +
