= Hyper Hyper =

Single by Scooter

from the album ... and the Beat Goes On!
- B-side: "Rhapsody In E"; "Unity Without Words Part 1"
- Released: 26 May 1994
- Studio: Ambience, Hamburg
- Genre: Techno; rave
- Length: 5:10
- Label: Club Tools; Scorpio Music
- Songwriters: H. P. Baxxter; Rick J. Jordan; Jens Thele; Ferris Bueller
- Producer: The Loop!

Scooter singles chronology
"Vallée de Larmes" (1993)	"Hyper Hyper" (1994)	"Move Your Ass!" (1995)

Music video
- "Hyper Hyper" on YouTube

"Hyper Hyper" is a song by German band Scooter, released in May 1994 by Club Tools and Scorpio Music as the first single from their debut album, ... and the Beat Goes On! (1995). It was sold in three versions: two of the versions had the same track listings, but different covers. The song was one of the most successful dance hits of 1994. The original "Hyper Hyper" quotes were taken from Ultra-Sonic's 1993 track "Annihilating Rhythm (Do you love your hardcore?)", licensed to Low Spirit Records/Polydor. Ultra-Sonic receive a "big shout" in the lyrics of the song, as do a further thirty DJs who were popular in Germany in the mid-1990s.

== Background and release ==
At a party in Hamburg, Scooter improvised on an instrumental house track. Band member H.P. Baxxter started mentioning the names of his favourite DJs and then yelled the buzz words Hyper Hyper. Through its instant success that night, they decided to record this joke. Edel/Club Tools dance product manager Jens Thele told Music & Media, "We're aware it sounds very German, but we never cut it with that intention. But since the European success of Mo-Do's 'Eins Zwei Polizei', it's very likely to spread out as well. With K2's 'Der Berg Ruft' you can almost speak of a wave of similar hits."

== Critical reception ==
Pan-European magazine Music & Media wrote, "In the wake of massive successes by DJs-turned-performers such as Marusha, Sven Väth, Westbam and Jam & Spoon, a new star is born. Produced by, a highly successful remixer collective, all ingredients are present to emulate the success of the aforementioned." They also described it as "hilarious" and "instantly catchy", noting that the track "deftly fused hardcore with a razor-sharp pop sensibility."

† means the DJ has passed away

DJs that received "big-shouts"
Name	Nationality	Notes
WestBam	German	
Marusha	German-Greek	
Steve Mason	Scottish	
The Mystic Man		
DJ Dick	German	
Carl Cox	English	
Da Hooligan	German	
Cosmic	Irish	
Kid Paul	German	
Dag	German	
Mijk van Dijk	German	
Jens Lissat	German	
Lenny Dee	American	
Sven Väth	German	
Mark Spoon	German	†
Marco Zaffarano	German	
Hell	German	
Paul Elstak	Dutch-Surinamese	
Mate Galic	Croatian	
Roland Casper	German	
Silvie Loto	Italian	
Miss Djax	Dutch	
Jens Mahlstedt	German	
Tanith	German	
Laurent Garnier	French	
Special	German	
Pascal F.E.O.S.	German	†
Gary D	German	†
Scotty	German	
Gizmo	Dutch	

== Music video ==
The accompanying music video for "Hyper Hyper" was directed by Plastic Reality. It was A-listed on Germany's VIVA in October 1994.

== Track listings ==
- CD maxi – Germany (September 9, 1994) (CLU 6073–5)
1. "Hyper Hyper" (Faster, Harder, Scooter) – 5:15
2. "Hyper Hyper" (On a Spanish Fly Tip) – 5:12
3. "Hyper Hyper" (Original version) – 5:13
4. "Hyper Hyper" (Video edit) – 3:37
5. "Rhapsody in E" – 6:08
- CD single – Germany (September 9, 1994)
1. "Hyper Hyper" (Original version) – 5:11
2. "Hyper Hyper" (Faster, Harder, Scooter) – 5:12
- 12" maxi – Germany (September 9, 1994)
1. "Hyper Hyper" (Faster, Harder, Scooter) – 5:12
2. "Hyper Hyper" (On a Spanish Fly Tip) – 5:10
3. "Hyper Hyper" (Original version) – 5:11
4. "Rhapsody in E" – 6:08
- 12 maxi – Germany (May 28, 1994)
1. "Hyper, Hyper" – 5:10
2. "Unity Without Words Part 1" – 6:02
3. "Rhapsody in E" – 6:10
- CD maxi – Australia (June 15, 1994), Germany (July 5, 1994) (CLU 6040–5)
- 12" maxi – Spain (May 28, 1994)
1. "Hyper Hyper" – 5:10
2. "Unity Without Words – Part I" – 6:02
3. "Rhapsody in E" – 6:10
- 12" maxi – Spain (July 1994)
1. "Hyper Hyper" (On a Spanish Fly Trip) – 5:12
2. "Hyper Hyper" (Video edit) – 3:37
3. "Faster, Harder, Scooter" – 5:14
4. "Hyper Hyper" (Original version) – 5:13
5. "Rhapsody in E" – 6:08
- CD maxi – France (July 1994)
1. "Hyper Hyper" (Video edit) – 3:36
2. "Hyper Hyper" (Faster, Harder, Scooter) – 5:14
3. "Hyper Hyper" (Original version) – 5:12
4. "Hyper Hyper" (On a Spanish Fly Tip) – 5:12
- CD single – France (July 1994)
1. "Hyper Hyper" (Video edit) – 3:36
2. "Hyper Hyper" (Original version) – 5:12
- 12" maxi – France (July 1994)
1. "Hyper Hyper" (Faster, Harder, Scooter) – 5:14
2. "Hyper Hyper" (On a Spanish Fly Tip) – 5:12
3. "Hyper Hyper" (Original version) – 5:12
4. "Hyper Hyper" (Video edit) – 3:36
- 12 maxi – Italy
1. "Hyper Hyper" (Faster, Harder, Scooter) – 5:12
2. "Hyper Hyper" (On a Spanish Fly Tip) – 5:10
3. "Hyper Hyper" (Original version) – 5:11
4. "Rhapsody in E" – 6:08

== Charts ==
=== Weekly charts ===
Chart (1994/95)	Peak position
Austria (Ö3 Austria Top 40)	2
Belgium (Ultratop 50 Flanders)	28
Belgium (Ultratop 50 Wallonia)	28
Europe (Eurochart Hot 100)	6
Europe (European Dance Radio)	8
Finland (Suomen virallinen lista)	4
France (SNEP)	28
Germany (GfK)	2
Ireland (IRMA)	23
Israel (Israeli Singles Chart)	26
Italy (Musica e dischi)	5
Netherlands (Dutch Top 40)	12
Netherlands (Single Top 100)	7
Norway (VG-lista)	10
Spain (AFYVE)	1
Sweden (Sverigetopplistan)	26
Switzerland (Schweizer Hitparade)	3

=== Year-end charts ===
Chart (1994)	Position
Germany (Media Control)	27

Chart (1995)	Position
Belgium (Ultratop 50 Wallonia)	88
Europe (Eurochart Hot 100)	77
Netherlands (Dutch Top 40)	70
Netherlands (Single Top 100)	85
Switzerland (Schweizer Hitparade)	49

== Certifications ==
Region	Certification	Certified units/sales
Austria (IFPI Austria)	Gold	25,000^{*}
Germany (BVMI)	Platinum	500,000^{^}
^{*} Sales figures based on certification alone.^{^} Shipments figures based on certification alone.

== Covers ==
The song was covered by Modeselektor and Otto Von Schirach on the Modeselektor album Happy Birthday!.
