= Eis-und Schwimmstadion =

Arena in Cologne, Germany

Coordinates: 50.958675°N 6.964981°E

Eis- und Schwimmstadion
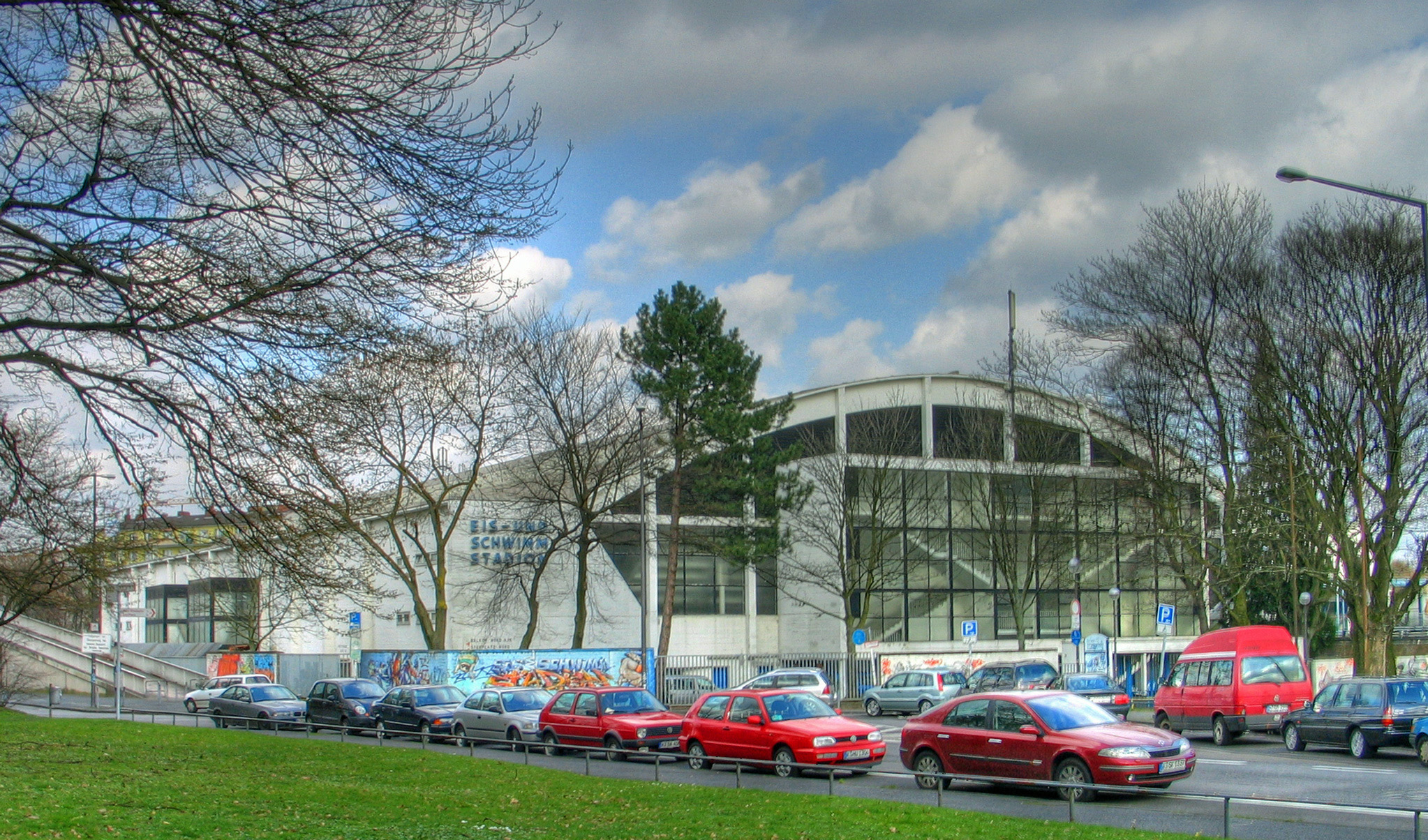
- Interactive map of Eis- und Schwimmstadion
- Full name: Eis- und Schwimmstadion
- Location: Cologne, Germany
- Capacity: 7,200

Construction
- Opened: 1936
- Demolished: 2008

Tenant
- Kölner Haie

Eis- und Schwimmstadion, was an arena in Cologne, Germany. It is primarily used for ice hockey, and was the home to the Kölner Haie of the Deutsche Eishockey Liga until the Lanxess Arena opened in 1998. It opened in 1936 and holds 7,200 spectators.
