= Low Spirit =

German music label

Low Spirit Recordings GmbH
- Founded: 1986
- Founder: WestBam; Fabian Lenz; William Röttger; Klaus Jankuhn; Sandra Molzahn
- Status: Defunct
- Distributor(s): EFA, Urban/Polydor (PolyGram), BMG
- Genre: Techno, Rave
- Country of origin: Germany
- Location: Berlin, Germany
- Official website: http://www.low-spirit.de/

Low Spirit Recordings was a German techno record label.

== History ==
Founded in 1986 by Maximilian Lenz (Westbam), Fabian Lenz (DJ Dick), William Röttger, Klaus Jankuhn and Sandra Molzahn. The first record was WestBam's 17 - This Is Not a Boris Becker Song which reached #1 in the Berlin dance music hitlist. Low Spirit became acquainted with the Love Parade event from its early years and the theme for its 1997 event, titled Sonic Empire, has reached the top of the German single charts. The label was later praised for "having made German techno history" by "Raveline" magazine.

In the 1990s, Low Spirit was also owner of the event Mayday. The label was shut down and all future distributions by Low Spirit were taken over by Kontor Records in 2007.

== Artists ==
- CIRC
- DJ Dick
- Eastbam
- Genlog
- Hardy Hard
- Lexy & K-Paul
- L.U.P.O.
- Marc de Clarq
- Mark 'Oh
- Marusha
- Members of Mayday
- Miss Kittin & The Hacker
- Mr.X and Mr.Y
- Die Raketen
- Raver's Nature
- RMB
- Tanith (DJ)
- WestBam
- Michal Lazar
