= Our Happy Hardcore =

Studio album by Scooter
- Released: 28 March 1996
- Recorded: 1995–1996
- Studios: Loop Dance Constructions Studios, Hamburg, Germany
- Length: 45:02
- Label: Club Tools
- Producer: The Loop!

Scooter chronology
| ... and the Beat Goes On! (1995) | Our Happy Hardcore (1996) | Wicked! (1996) |

Singles from Our Happy Hardcore
- 1. "Back in the U.K." Released: 14 November 1995; 2. "Let Me Be Your Valentine" Released: 29 February 1996; 3. "Rebel Yell" Released: 9 May 1996

Our Happy Hardcore is the second studio album by German dance group Scooter. The European release date for the album was 28 March 1996. Three singles were released from the album, starting with "Back in the U.K." in November 1995 and "Let Me Be Your Valentine" in February 1996. The final single, a cover version of the Billy Idol song "Rebel Yell", followed in May 1996. The mostly instrumental "Crank It Up" is notable for its use as the theme tune for the Bruno segments in Da Ali G Show.

Followed by the success of the debut album "...And The Beat Goes On", this album continues the experimenting of happy hardcore and rave styles.

The album was re-released on LP on 31 July 2021 to coincide with the 25th anniversary of the album's release. It was available on black and orange LP, with the orange coloured vinyl being limited to 500 copies.

== Track listing ==
All songs written by Rick J. Jordan, H.P. Baxxter, Ferris Bueller, and Jens Thele, except "Rebel Yell" written by Billy Idol and Steve Stevens.

1. "Let Me Be Your Valentine" – 5:42
2. "Stuttgart" – 4:52
3. "Rebel Yell" – 3:57
4. "Last Minute" – 2:57
5. "Our Happy Hardcore" – 5:25
6. "Experience" – 4:56
7. "This is a Monstertune" – 4:22
8. "Back in the U.K." – 3:25
9. "Hysteria" – 5:18
10. "Crank It Up" – 4:08

Notes

- "Rebel Yell" is a cover of the Billy Idol song, taken from the 1983 album of the same name.
- The song "Last Minute" is a version of the Hebrew folk song "Hava Nagila".
- "Experience" is based on Scooter's unreleased remix of "Angeli Domini" by Datura.
- "Back in the U.K." samples the theme tune of the British television series Miss Marple, originally composed by Ron Goodwin.
- "Hysteria" is a cover of "Hysteria (There's No Reason To Be Disturbed)" by Hysteria. This track was made by Rick J. Jordan in 1991, so this track is technically a cover of their own track.
- A remixed version of "Crank It Up" is used in the Da Ali G Show as Brüno's (played by Sacha Baron Cohen) theme music. This version is later used in the 2009 movie "Brüno".

== Extended version ==
There was also an extended version of the album, released under JVC Japan label on 18 April 2000. Not available in Germany until late 2003, the extended version featured five additional tracks, including remixes of all three singles from the original album.

The additional tracks featured on the extended version are:

- "Back in the U.K." (Long Version) – 5:27
- "Back in the U.K." (Tom Wilson Remix) – 5:50
- "Let Me be Your Valentine" (Commander Tom Remix) – 8:05
- "Eternity" – 5:23
- "Rebel Yell" (Extended Mix) – 4:44

== 20 Years of Hardcore Expanded Edition ==
A digitally remastered edition released in 2013. It contains 2 CDs: the first one is the original album, the second one contains the singles, B-sides and the remixes related to the album.

== Personnel ==
- H.P. Baxxter (vocals, lyrics)
- Rick J. Jordan, Ferris Bueller (synthesizers, post-production)
- Jens Thele (manager)
- Marc Schilkowski (album art)
- Andreas Kess (photos)

== Charts ==
=== Weekly charts ===
Weekly chart performance for Our Happy Hardcore
| Chart (1996) | Peak position |
|---|---|
| Austrian Albums (Ö3 Austria) | 16 |
| Dutch Albums (Album Top 100) | 54 |
| Finnish Albums (Suomen virallinen lista) | 8 |
| German Albums (Offizielle Top 100) | 17 |
| Hungarian Albums (MAHASZ) | 1 |
| Scottish Albums (Official Charts) | 16 |
| Swedish Albums (Sverigetopplistan) | 31 |
| Swiss Albums (Schweizer Hitparade) | 9 |
| UK Albums (Official Charts) | 24 |

=== Year-end charts ===
Year-end chart performance for Our Happy Hardcore
| Chart (1996) | Position |
|---|---|
| German Albums Chart | 91 |
