= RMB (band) =

German techno-rave duo

RMB was a German techno-rave duo, founded in 1993 by musicians and producers Farid Gharadjedaghi and Rolf Maier-Bode (whose initials form the band name). Despite that, RMB has always been a duo since the project's formation in '93.

== History ==
The two met in 1991 while working for the Adam & Eve label, Maier-Bode as a producer and Gharadjedaghi as A&R. After two releases under the RMB name, they split from Adam & Eve in 1993 to join the Low Spirit label. Their 1996 single, "Spring," was a gold record in Germany, with sales over 250,000 copies, and the follow-up "Reality" reached #11 in the Media Control charts. After this, they worked with Sharam Jey and Talla 2XLC. In 1998, they founded their label, Various Silver Recordings.

Through their association with German rave culture, they have engaged in environmental activism, joining Greenpeace in protest against the Moruroa atoll nuclear testing, to which they dedicated the track "Our Trip to Mururoa", a B-side found in the single "Passport to Heaven."

RMB split up in 2006. Their last studio album, "Evolution," was released online on March 18, 2009.

== Members ==
- Rolf Maier-Bode - production, keyboard, programming
- Farid Gharadjedaghi - production, keyboards, engineering, mixing

== Discography ==
=== Albums ===
- 1995 This World Is Yours
- 1995 Trax (Unofficial Release)
- 1998 Widescreen
- 2001 Mission Horizon
- 2002 Mission Horizon 2.0
- 2003 A Tribute To RMB
- 2009 Evolution

=== Singles ===
- 1993 "Trax 1"
- 1993 "Trax 2"
- 1993 "Heaven & Hell EP"
- 1994 "Love EP"
- 1994 "Redemption" (with Kristina Totzek)
- 1994 "Redemption (Remixes)" (with Kristina Totzek)
- 1995 "Experience" (with Kristina Totzek)
- 1995 "Experience (Remixes)" (with Kristina Totzek)
- 1995 "Love Is An Ocean" (with Sheila Chandra)
- 1995 "Love Is An Ocean (Remixes)" (with Sheila Chandra)
- 1995 "Passport to Heaven" (with Kristina Totzek)
- 1995 "Passport to Heaven (Remixes)" (with Kristina Totzek)
- 1996 "Spring" (with Marion Haarmeyer)
- 1996 "Spring (Mixes)" (with Marion Haarmeyer)
- 1996 "Reality" (with Angela Caran)
- 1996 "Reality (Mixes)" (with Angela Caran)
- 1997 "Break The Silence/Everything" (with Angela Caran)
- 1998 "Shadows" (with Sharam Jey and Christina Lux)
- 1998 "Everything EP"
- 2000 "Deep Down Below" (with Christina Lux)
- 2001 "Horizon" (with Christina Lux)
- 2001 "Selected Works"
- 2002 "Redemption 2.0" (with Kristina Totzek)
- 2003 "Spring 2003" (with Talla 2XLC and Miriam Adameit)
- 2003 "Touch The Sky/Feel The Flame"
- 2004 "Gangster/Killer"
- 2004 "April/Beauty Of Simplicity"
- 2023 "Redemption" (with Moguai)

=== Other aliases ===
- 1992 "Droid EP", as Skyflyer (with Arndt Pecher)
- 1992 "Humanoid EP", as Skyflyer (with Arndt Pecher)
- 1993 "Skyflyer II", as Skyflyer (with Arndt Pecher)
- 1993 "Skyflyer III", as Skyflyer (with Arndt Pecher)
- 1993 "Manitou in Africa", as Manitou
- 1996 "Manitou in Africa 1996 (The 4 Years Later Version)", as Manitou
- 1998 "One EP", as Waldorf & Staettler
- 2004 "Special Online EP", as Waldorf & Staettler
