= Fabian Lenz =

German DJ, Techno musician and events producer

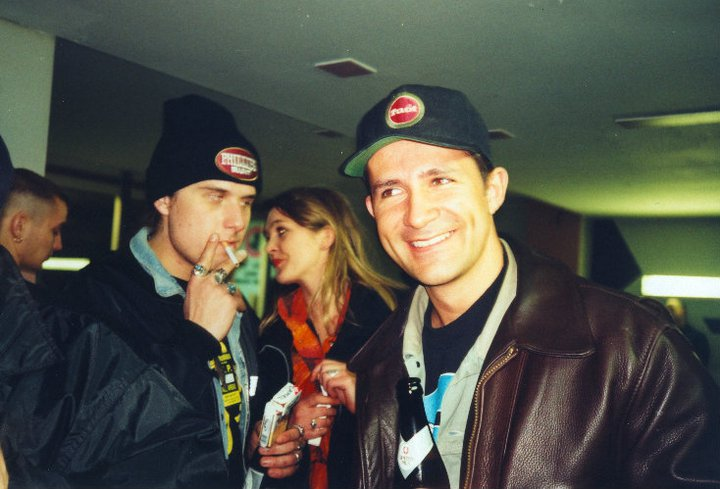
Fabian Lenz (right)

Fabian Lenz is a German DJ, Techno musician and events producer, who was also known before under the moniker DJ Dick.

== Life and career ==
Lenz has three siblings. His brother is Maximilian Lenz alias DJ WestBam. His sister Seraphina Lenz is an artist.

Lenz has been working as a DJ since 1984. In 1985 he founded the record label Low Spirit together with his brother Maximilian Lenz, producer Klaus Jankuhn, Sandra Molzahn and William Röttger. One of the most important acts on the label has been Marusha, which was in a relationship with Lenz at that time.

In 1988 Lenz released a few singles and EPs on Low Spirit, most of which have been produced together with Klaus Jankuhn. Lenz also remixed tracks by Raver’s Nature (Somebody Scream, 1996) and Genlog (More Music, 1998).

Lenz also initiated the idea for Germany's largest indoor-rave Mayday, which was established in 1991 in order to save the East German youth radio station DT64, which should be liquidated after the Peaceful Revolution in 1989.

At the end of the 1990s Lenz stopped working as a DJ and only rarely produced further music. In 2001 Lenz became Managing director of Love Parade GmbH, which organised the annual Loveparades. End of 2004 he resigned from that post after he was demoralized by the job which he described as "treading water".

In May 2007 Lenz together with Dimitri Hegemann reopened the Berlin technoclub Tresor. In 2009 and 2010 Lenz organized the „Berlin, Beats & Boats“ techno parties on steamboats.

Scooter mentions Lenz in their 1994 song Hyper Hyper, during which lead singer H.P. Baxxter reads out the name of numerous DJs.

== Discography ==
- 1988: DJ Dick – Exzess (Low Spirit)
- 1990: DJ Dick – On A Mission (Low Spirit)
- 1991: DJ Dick – Weekend (Low Spirit)
- 1992: DJ Dick – No Chill Out Necessary (Low Spirit)
- 1992: Number 5 (with Klaus Jankuhn) – Alright Alright (Low Spirit)
- 1993: DJ Dick – L.O.S.T. (Low Spirit)
- 1993: DJ Dick – Lost On Mayday (Low Spirit)
- 1993: DJ Dick – The Iron Raver (Low Spirit)
- 1995: DJ Dick – Sono In Coma (Low Spirit)
- 1995: DJ Dick – Sono In Coma (The Remixes) (Low Spirit)
- 1996: DJ Dick – Paraguys (Low Spirit)
- 1996: Number 5 (with Klaus Jankuhn) – Untitled (Low Spirit UK Ltd)
- 1999: Worst Case Scenario (with Kay Lippert) – Let Me See You M.Y.B. (Electric Kingdom)
- 2000: Dicktator (with Maximilian Lenz, Klaus Jankuhn) – Weekend (Electric Kingdom)
