= Members of Mayday =

German techno band

- Origin: Germany
- Genres: Techno
- Years active: 1991–2014
- Labels: Data Records (2003-2005) Destined Records (2008)
- Past members: Klaus Jankuhn; WestBam

Members of Mayday was a German techno project by Klaus Jankuhn and WestBam. From 1991 until 2013 the Members of Mayday created the official hymn of the annual Mayday Rave, which at the time was Germany's largest indoor rave. In February 2014 WestBam left the group.

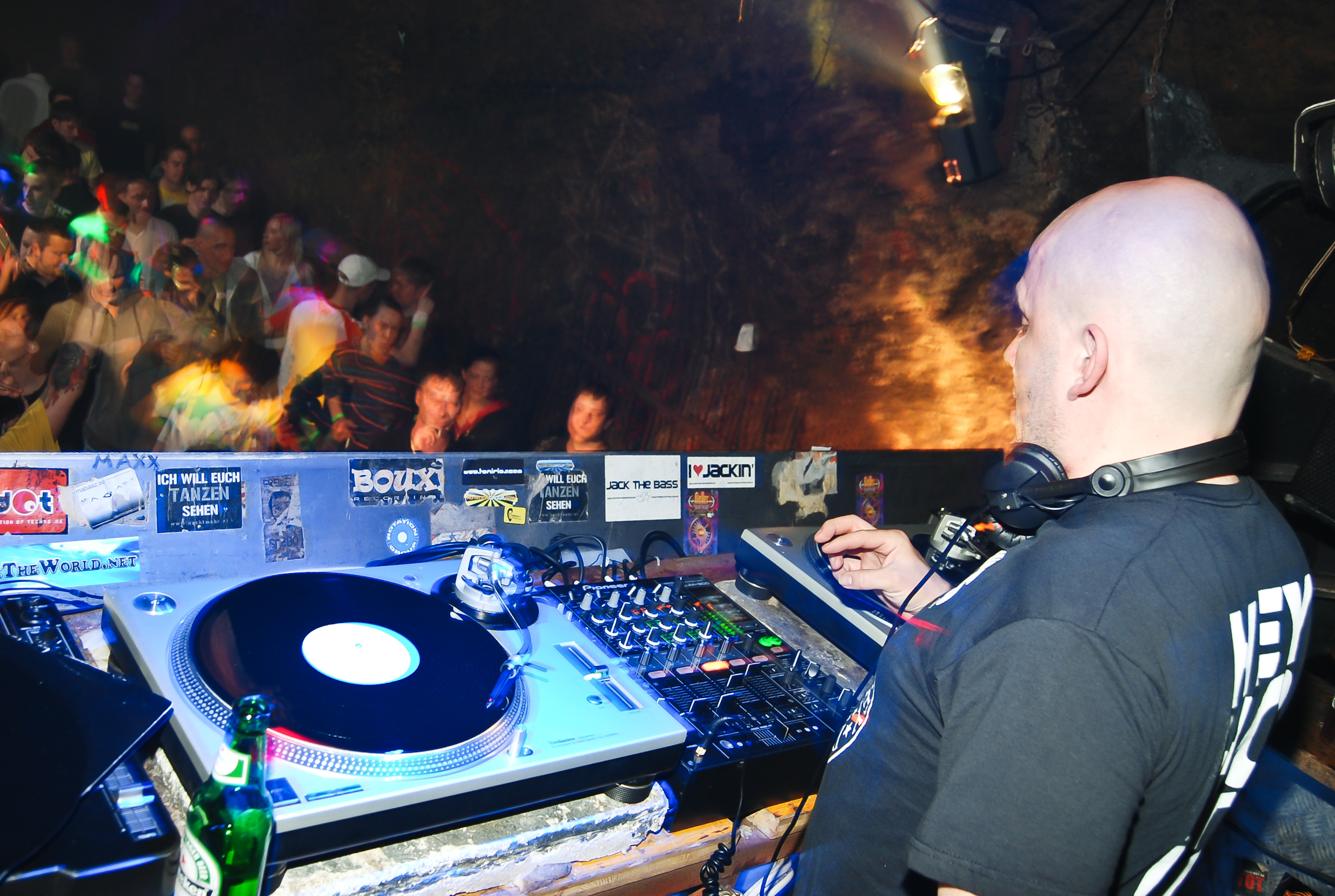
WestBam performing at Cave Club in Salzburg in 2009

== Discography ==
=== Studio albums ===
- Members Only (1995)
- Anthems Of The Decade (2001)
- All In One (2009)

== Singles ==
Year	Single	Peak chart positions									Album
Year	Single	AUT	BEL	FIN	FRA	GER	NED	SUI	SWE	UK	Album
1992	"The MAYDAY Anthem" (as WestBam)	—	19	—	—	—	31	—	—	—	Singles only
1992	"Forward Ever Backward Never" (as WestBam)	—	—	—	—	—	—	—	—	—	Singles only
1993	"Judgement Day"	—	—	—	—	—	—	—	—	—	Singles only
1993	"Religion"	—	—	—	—	38	—	—	—	—	Members Only
1994	"Rave Olympia (Enter The Arena)"	—	29	—	—	27	—	—	14	—	Members Only
1994	"We Are Different"	—	—	2	—	13	48	35	19	—	Members Only
1995	"The Bells of Reformation"	—	—	—	—	17	—	35	35	—	Members Only
1995	"Great"	—	—	13	—	49	—	—	58	—	Singles only
1996	"The Day X"	—	—	13	—	47	—	—	—	—	Singles only
1996	"Live from Mars" (as Members from Mars)	—	—	—	—	—	—	—	—	—	Singles only
1997	"Sonic Empire"	15	—	—	—	1	44	7	—	59	Singles only
1997	"Live at the Sonic Empire"	—	—	—	69	—	—	—	—	—	Singles only
1998	"Save the Robots"	—	—	—	—	38	—	—	—	—	Singles only
1999	"Soundtropolis"	—	—	—	—	14	—	—	—	—	Singles only
2000	"Datapop"	—	—	—	—	42	—	99	—	—	Singles only
2001	"10IN01"	—	58	—	—	16	—	98	—	31	Singles only
2002	"Culture Flash"	—	—	—	—	13	—	—	—	—	Singles only
2003	"Troopa of Tomorrow"	—	—	—	—	53	—	—	—	—	Singles only
2004	"Team X-Treme"	—	—	—	—	56	—	—	—	—	Singles only
2005	"Prototypes"	—	—	—	—	52	—	—	—	—	Singles only
2006	"Worldclub"	—	—	—	—	75	—	—	—	—	Singles only
2007	"New Euphoria"	—	—	—	—	81	—	—	—	—	Singles only
2008	"Reflect Yourself"	—	—	—	—	—	—	—	—	—	Singles only
2009	"Massive Moments"	—	—	—	—	—	—	—	—	—	Singles only
2010	"Make My Day"	—	—	—	—	—	—	—	—	—	Singles only
2011	"Ravemobil"	—	—	—	—	—	—	—	—	—	Singles only
2012	"The Perfect Machine"	—	—	—	—	—	—	—	—	—	Singles only
2013	"Never Stop"	—	—	—	—	—	—	—	—	—	Singles only
