= Klaus Jankuhn =

German record producer and musician

Klaus Jankuhn (born 12 January 1965) is a German record producer and musician, considered a pioneer in the early German techno scene. He mostly worked for the artists of the rave label Low Spirit, producing artists such as WestBam, Marusha or DJ Dick. Together with WestBam he also founded the project Members of Mayday.

== Life ==
Klaus Jankuhn grew up in Münster, where he befriended with WestBam. Both started producing tracks for the early techno and rave scene. Around 1986 he moved to Berlin.

One of their first tracks 17 – This is not a Boris Becker Song was released in 1985 under the moniker Cowboy Temple. Soon after Jankuhn, WestBam, Fabian Lenz and William Röttger founded the label Low Spirit.

Jankuhn and WestBam also produced the anthems for the annual Mayday festivals (as Members of Mayday) and Love Parades (as The Love Committee).

== Awards ==
- 1995: Echo Pop as "Best producer national“
- 2003: Dance Music Award as "Best producer" (shared with WestBam)
