= Marusha =

German-Greek disc jockey

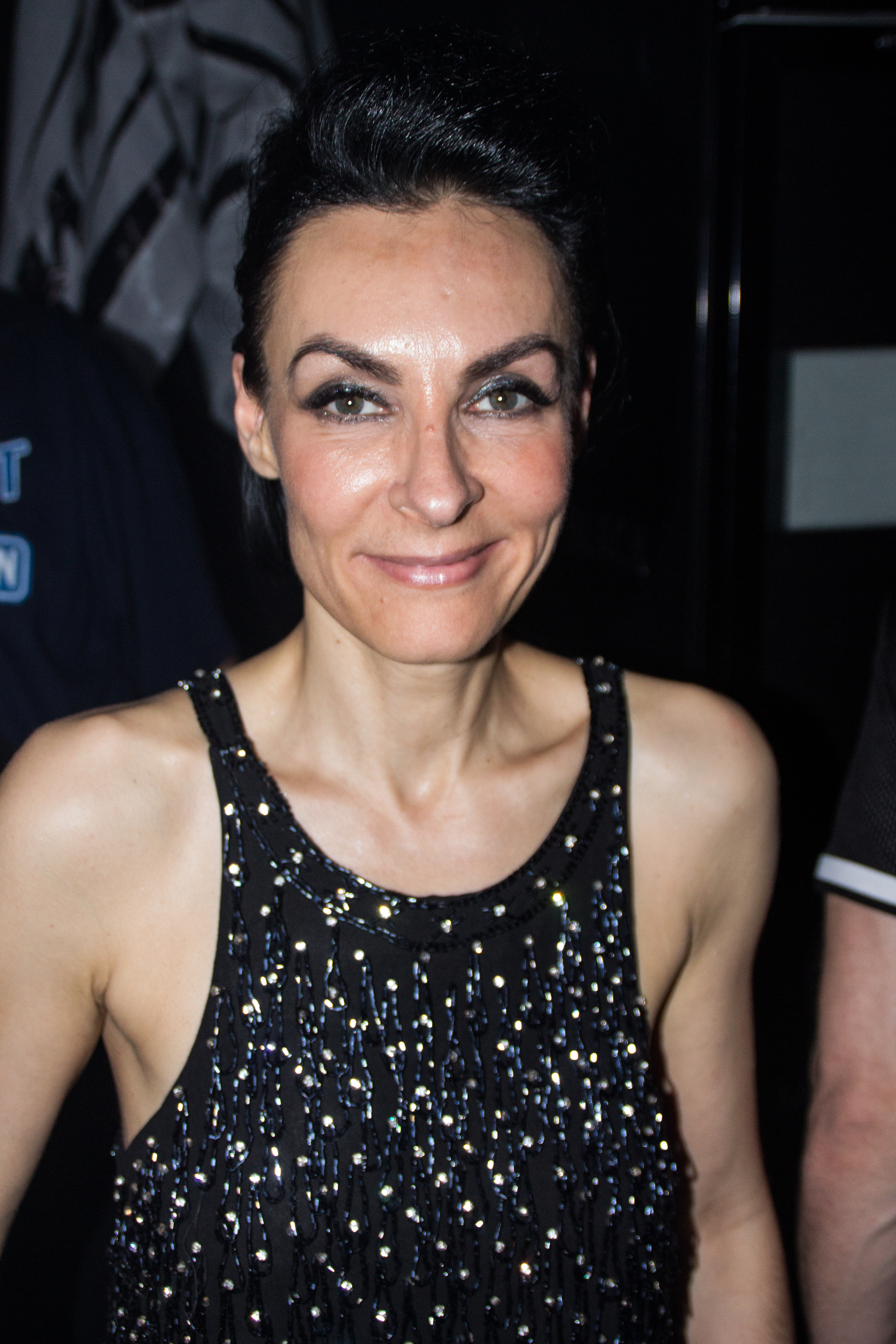
- Marusha in 2015

Background information
- Born: Marion Aphrodite Gleiß; 18 November 1966 (age 59)
- Origin: Nuremberg, West Germany
- Genres: Electronica, happy hardcore, breakbeat
- Website: www.marusha.de

Marusha Aphrodite Gleiß (born 18 November 1966), known by her stage name Marusha, is a German-Greek electronic music disc jockey, producer and television presenter who had hits in the mid-1990s including her 1994 single "Somewhere Over the Rainbow".

== Career ==
Marusha was born in Nuremberg. She started as a radio disc jockey in 1991 with her weekly show Dancehall on Berlin station DT64. When the station closed she moved to Fritz, another Berlin radio station, and presented a weekly slot called Rave Satellite until 2007, when she was also a member of the jury in the German version of Popstars.

From 1993 to 1996 Marusha presented a television dance music show called Feuerreiter for regional broadcaster ORB, which later aired nationally via ARD.

Scooter mentions Marusha in their 1994 song "Hyper Hyper", during which lead singer H. P. Baxxter reads out the name of numerous DJs.

== Personal life ==
Marusha converted from Protestantism to Greek Orthodoxy.

== Discography ==
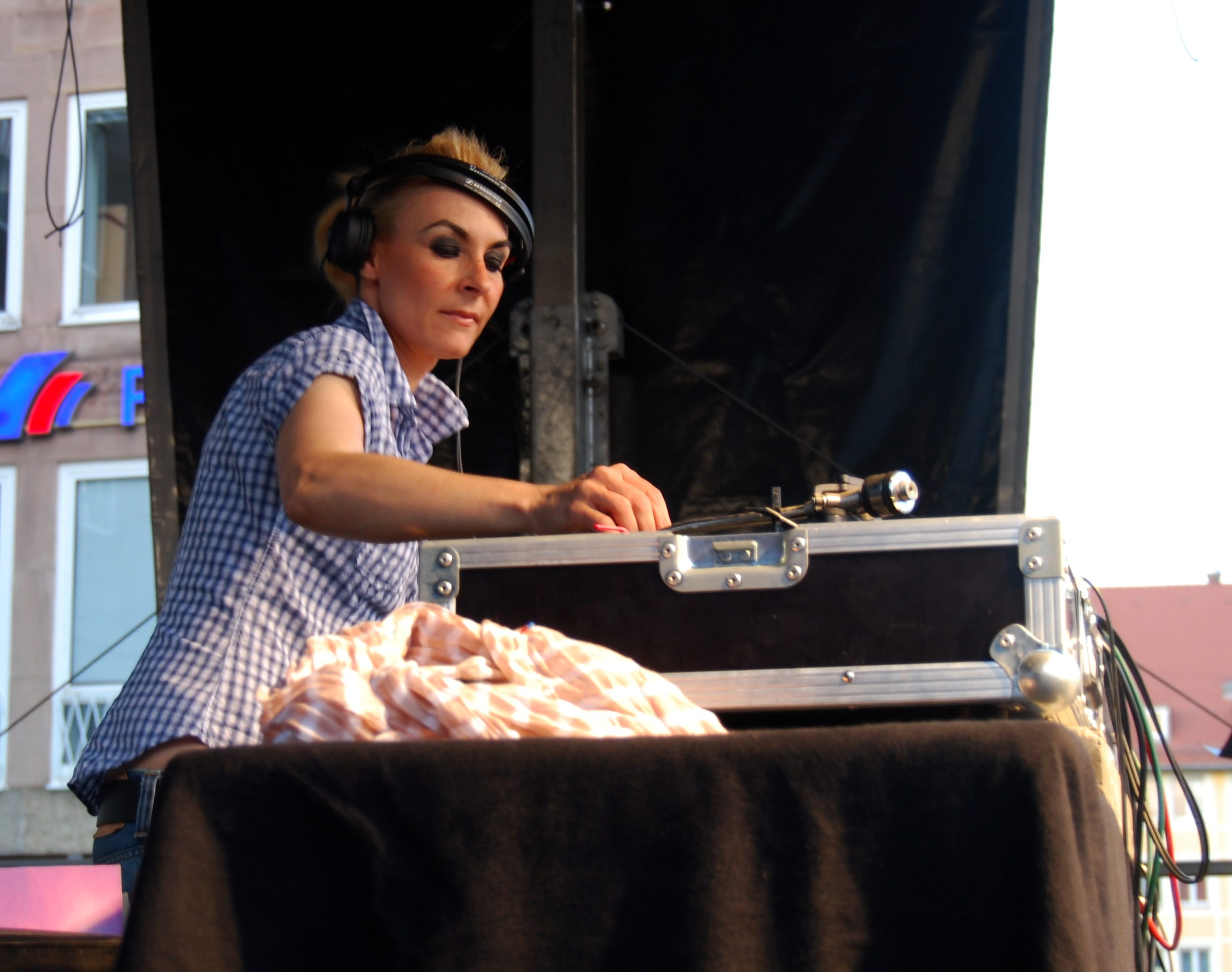
Marusha in Nuremberg in 2010

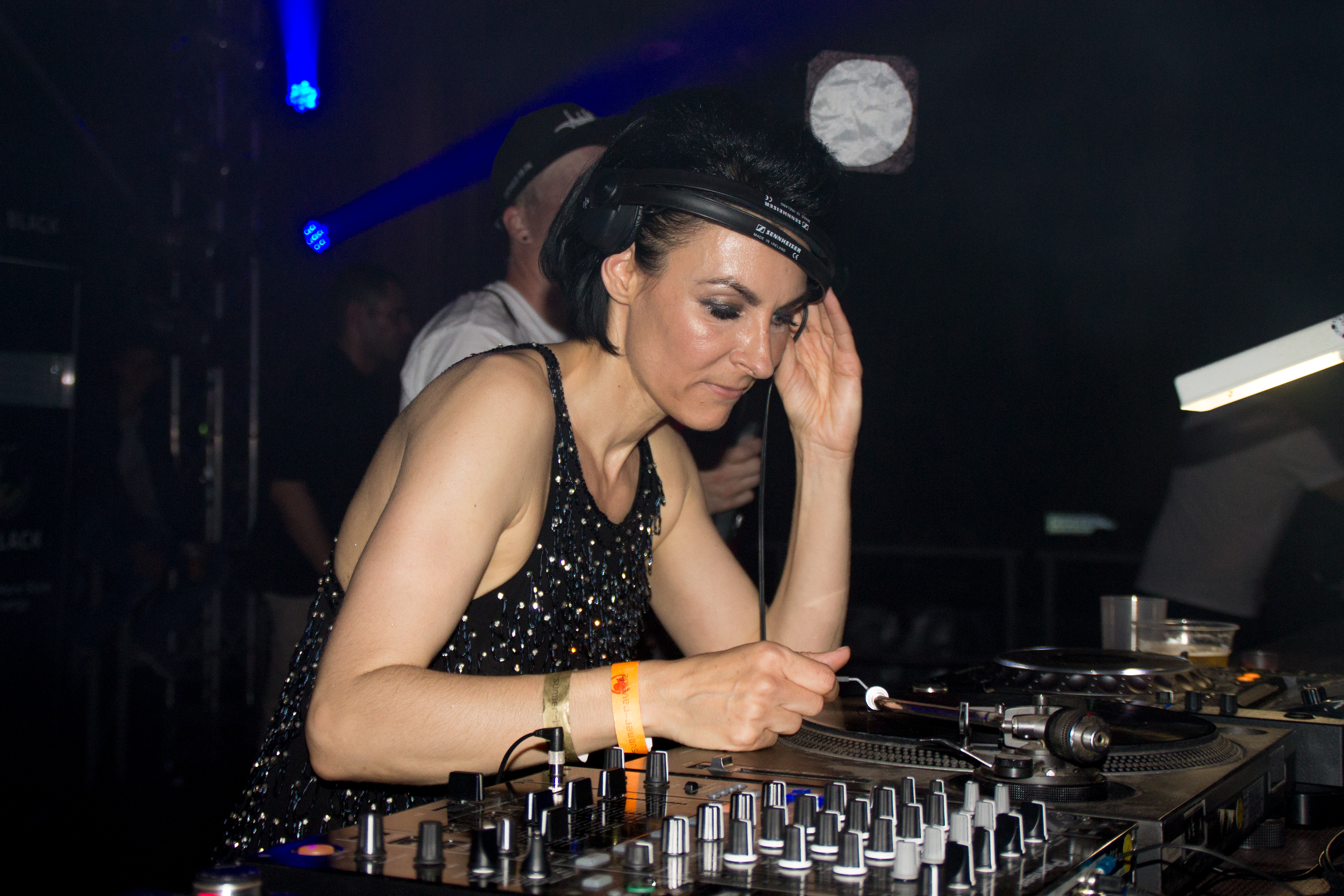
Marusha at Berlin Summer Rave 2015

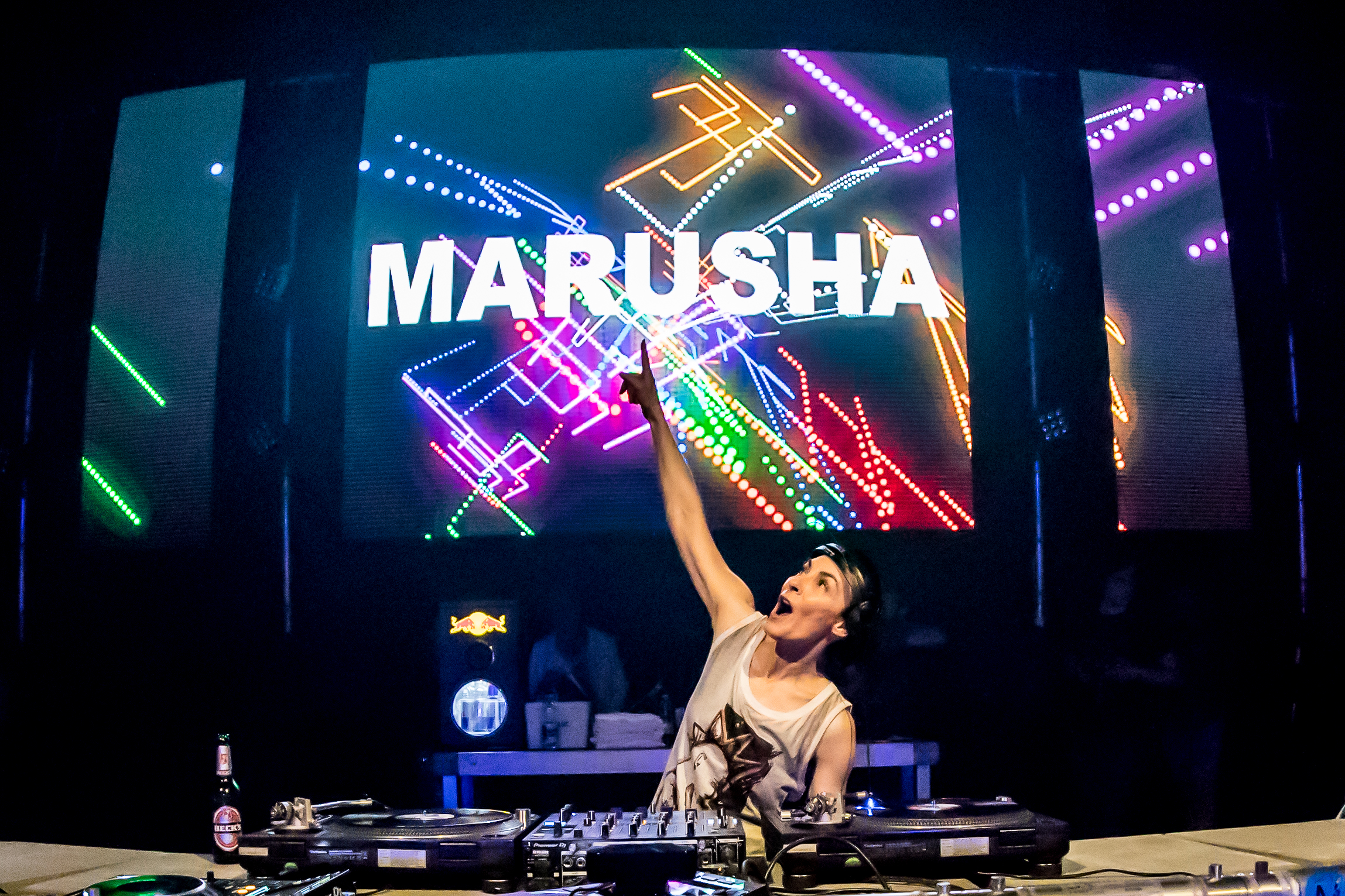
Marusha at Sunshine Live Retroactive 2017 in Mannheim

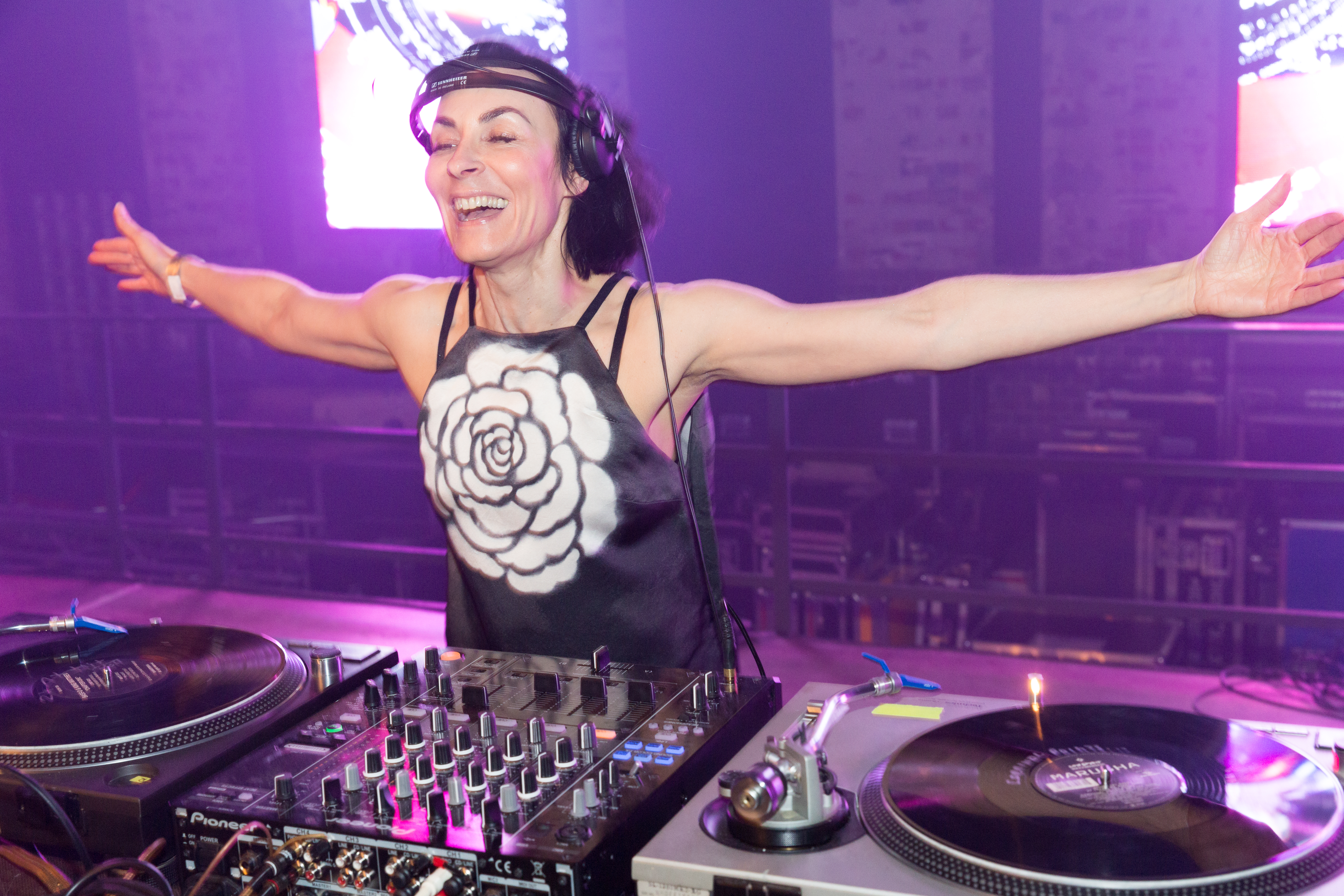
Marusha at 90er Rave in Berlin

Singles

Year	Single	Peak chart positions							Certifications (sales thresholds)	Album
Year	Single	GER	AUT	BEL (Vl)	FIN	NED	SUI	SWE	Certifications (sales thresholds)	Album
1992	"Ravechannel"	—	—	—	—	—	—	—		Raveland
1993	"Whatever Turns You On"	—	—	—	—	—	—	—		Single only
1993	"Go Ahead"	—	—	—	—	—	—	—		Raveland
1994	"Somewhere Over the Rainbow"	3	13	34	—	6	2	—	GER: Platinum	Raveland
1994	"It Takes Me Away"	3	21	—	9	12	18	—		Raveland
1994	"Trip to Raveland"	29	—	—	14	30	34	18		Raveland
1995	"Deep"	11	26	—	10	—	20	—		Wir
1995	"Unique"	35	38	—	8	—	—	—		Wir
1996	"Secret"	92	—	—	—	—	—	—		Wir
1997	"Ur Life"	34	—	—	—	—	—	—		No Hide No Run
1997	"My Best Friend"	73	—	—	—	—	—	—		No Hide No Run
1998	"Free Love"	97	—	—	—	—	—	—		No Hide No Run
1998	"Ultimate Sound"	70	—	—	—	—	—	—		Single only
2007	"Kick It (Heat)"	70	—	—	—	—	—	—		Heat
"—" denotes single that did not chart.

Albums

- 1994 Raveland (Ger #4)
- 1995 Wir (Ger #81)
- 1998 No Hide No Run (Ger #94)
- 2002 Nonstop (Mix-CD)
- 2004 Offbeat
- 2007 Heat
- 2012 Club Arrest
- 2018 Rave Satellite

Other singles

- "Jumpstart" (September 2000)
- "Touch Base" (as Maru; January 2001)
- "Chimes" (as Maru; January 2001)
- "We're Here" (as Maru; September 2001)
- "Snow in July" (October 2002)
- "Cha Cha Maharadsha" (May 2003)
- "Summertime" (with Tom Wax; 2012)

Remixes (select)

- Suspicious – "Lovewaves" (1994)
- WestBam – "Liberation" (1994)
- Yves Deruyter – "Outsiders" (1995)
- Tom Novy – "I House You" (1997)
- Bee Gees – "World" (1998)
- Söhne Mannheims – "Dein Glück liegt mir an Herzen" (2001)
- Simon Stockhausen – "Taipei Temple" (2008)
