= WestBam =

German DJ

Westbam
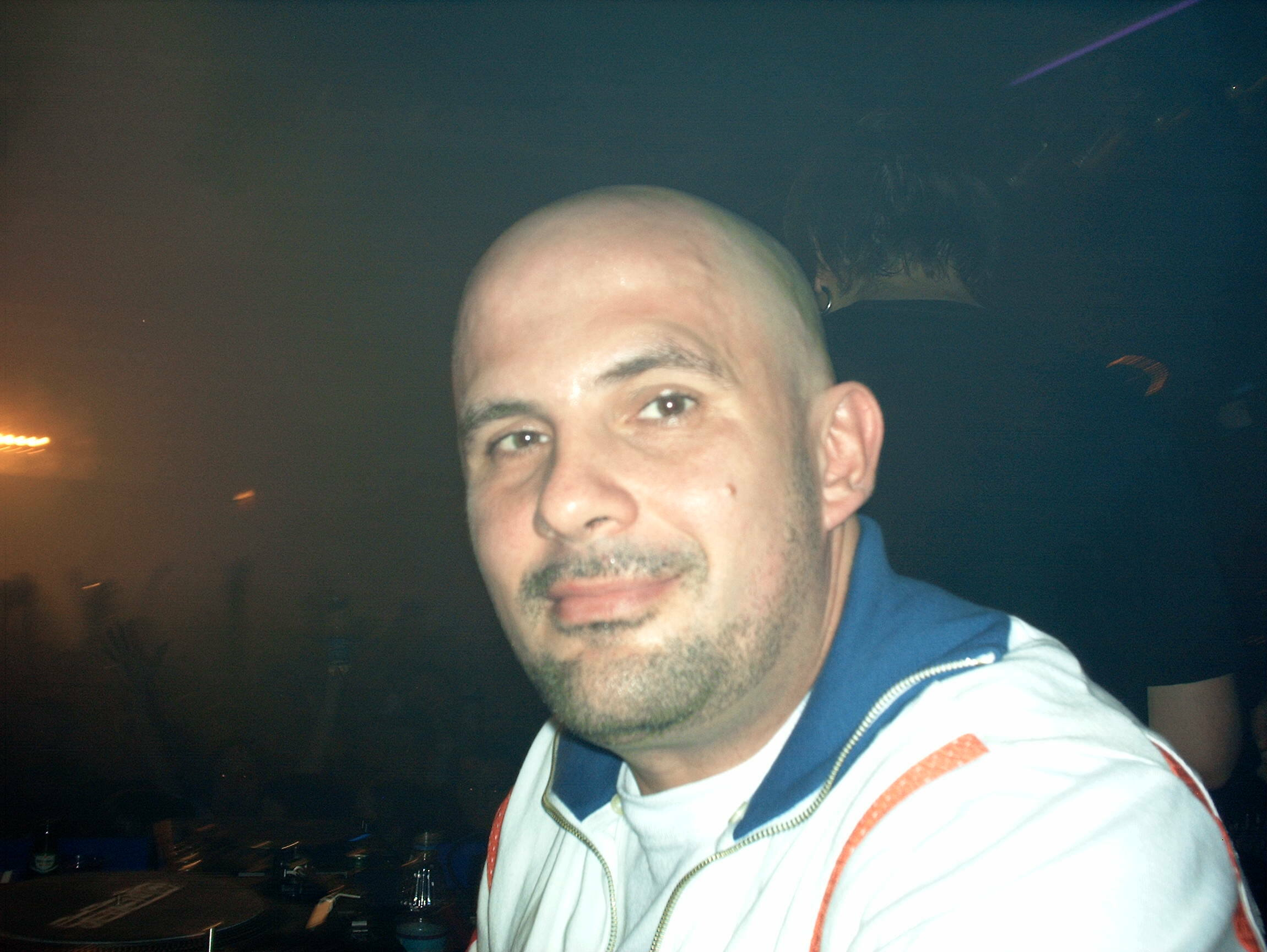
- Westbam in 2004

Background information
- Also known as: Frank Xerox, It's 2 Hard, Mr. Y, Professor Taub-Karcher, Von Sternhagel, WB Loops
- Born: Maximilian Lenz; 4 March 1965 (age 61); Münster, Westphalia, Germany
- Genres: Big beat; electro; breakbeat; techno
- Occupations: DJ; producer; remixer; label owner
- Years active: 1983–present
- Label: Low Spirit
- Website: Westbam.de

Maximilian Lenz (born 4 March 1965), known by his stage name WestBam, is a German DJ and musician. He is the co-founder of the record label Low Spirit.

== Career ==
Lenz started his musical career in 1978 in the punk scene of his birth town Münster under the moniker Frank Xerox. He then played bass, drums and synthesizer. Together with Andreas Bleckmann (alias Sally), he founded the band Anormal Null in 1979. Afterwards he founded Kriegsschauplatz, who were active until 1983.

The origin of his DJ moniker Westbam is a homage to Afrika Bambaataa, thus Westphalia Bambaataa. He started his career as a DJ in 1983 in the Odeon club in Münster. In 1984, he moved to his friend and mentor William Röttger in Berlin, where he released his first record called "17 – This Is Not a Boris Becker Song", which was co-produced by Klaus Jankuhn. WestBam, his brother Fabian Lenz, William Röttger, Klaus Jankuhn and Sandra Molzahn later founded their own label Low Spirit.

In 1985 Westbam published his influential text "What is Record-Art?", in which he described DJ techniques and characterized the DJ as a musician who composes tracks with records. In 1988, the Goethe-Institut sent Westbam as part of the German art show Kunstdisco to the 1988 Summer Olympics in Seoul.

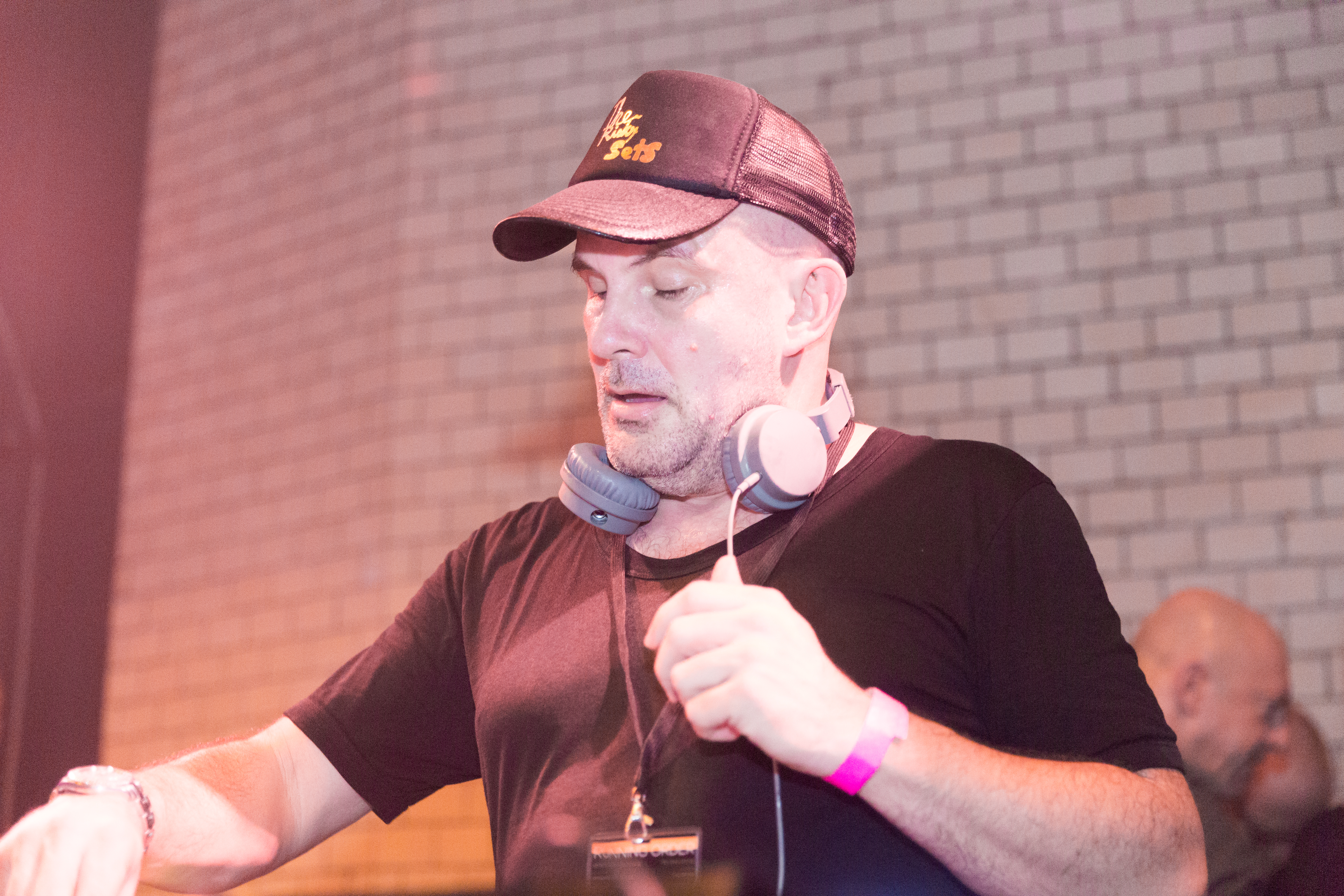
WestBam, 2016

He played at the first Love Parade rave party in 1989 at Kurfürstendamm, Berlin, and also wrote the Love Parade Anthems from 1997–2008. He was the only DJ, who played at all Love Parades from 1989 to 2008 and planned to perform for a last time at the Loveparade 2010, but cancelled his performance in response to the Love Parade disaster. He later heavily criticized the decision to continue the event despite the death of 21 visitors.

In 1991, he organised the first Mayday rave in Berlin. With over 5000 people, it was the biggest techno party in Germany at the time. Since then, Mayday has been vital to the German techno scene. Westbam was involved in the planning of the events, and also produced the annual Mayday anthems together with Klaus Jankuhn, in the project Members of Mayday until 2013. In February 2014, Westbam announced that he will not perform any longer at Mayday and the Members of Mayday project will disband.

After several single records he released his first album named The Cabinet. In 1993, he played a number of rave events in the United Kingdom including Obsession Passion at the Sanctuary in Milton Keynes. In 1997, he released his first book, titled Mixes, Cuts & Scratches. It dealt with the art, the work and the life of a DJ.

In 2005, he released an album Do You Believe in the Westworld, with the first single being "Bang The Loop". Westbam presented this album live with a band, which consisted of a drummer, a bass player, Klaus Jankuhn on keyboards and a laptop for programming and Westbam performing as MC.

Westbam released his triple album A Love Story 89-10 in 2010 on Bass Planet / Kontor Records.

2013 saw the release of his double album Götterstrasse, on which Westbam collaborated with artists such as Richard Butler, Lil Wayne, Rockell, Iggy Pop, Bernard Sumner, Inga Humpe, Brian Molko, Kanye West, Afrika Baby Bam and Hugh Cornwell.

== Personal life ==
Westbam has three siblings. His brother is Fabian Lenz, also known as DJ Dick. His sister Seraphina Lenz is an artist.

He is father of two sons and lives in Berlin-Prenzlauer Berg.

== In popular culture ==
Scooter mentions WestBam in their 1994 song Hyper Hyper, during which lead singer H.P. Baxxter reads out the name of numerous DJs.
