= List of Latvian films =

This is a list of films produced in Latvia since 1991. For an A-Z list, see Category:Latvian films

== 1991–1999 ==
Title	Director	Cast	Genre	Notes
1991
The Child of Man (Cilvēka bērns)	Jānis Streičs	Romualds Ancāns; Akvelīna Līvmane, Jānis Paukštello		Won award at the Chicago Children's Film Festival
The Times of the Land-Surveyors (Mērnieku laiki)	Varis Brasla	Elita Kļaviņa; Juris Žagars; Uldis Dumpis	Drama	
Depression				
1992
Anna Ziemassvetki	Laila Pakalniņa	-	Documentary	
Duplet	Aloizs Brenčs	Juris Žagars; Eduards Pāvuls; Ģirts Jakovļevs	Crime	
Daleko ot Sankt-Peterburga				
Spider				
1993
Baznīca	Laila Pakalniņa	-	Documentary	
Būris	Ansis Epners	Ivars Kants	Drama	
1994
1995
Dragon's Egg	Tālivaldis Margēvičs	Normunds Laizāns; Ināra Slucka	Mystery	
1996
Ziemassvētku jampadracis	Varis Brasla	Jānis Paukštello; Lāsma Zostiņa	Family	
1997
1998
Checking Out				
The Shoe (Kurpe)	Laila Pakalniņa			Screened at the 1998 Cannes Film Festival
1999
Gravitacijas lasts				

== 2000–2009 ==
Title	Director	Cast	Genre	Notes
2000
Dangerous Summer (Baiga vasara)	Aigars Grauba	Artūrs Skrastiņš; Uldis Dumpis; Inese Caune	Drama, War	
Baltijas sāga				
Pa ceļam aizejot	Viesturs Kairišs	Guna Zariņa		Lielais Kristaps in 2001
The Mystery of the Old Parish House (Vecās pagastmājas mistērija)	Jānis Streičs	Renārs Kaupers; Andris Bērziņš; Aurēlija Anužīte	Thriller	
2001
Nāves peņi	Juris Poškus	-	Documentary	
Sibīrijas gūstekņu ādas	Dzintra Geka	-	Documentary	
2002
Flashback	Frank Herz	-	Documentary	
2003
Negribu, negribu, varbūt negribu!...	Lauris Gundars	Inga Alsiņa; Rēzija Kalniņa; Indra Briķe		
Pitons	Laila Pakalniņa			Lielais Kristaps in 2003
Sibīrijas dienasgrāmatas	Dzintra Geka	-	Documentary	
Signe un...	Dzintra Geka	-	Documentary	
2004
Agent Madly in Love	Gatis Šmits	Guy Camilleri	Drama, Short	
Amats Nr. 1. Valsts prezidents	Dzintra Geka	-	Documentary	
Buss	Laila Pakalniņa	-	Documentary	
Bet stunda nāk	Juris Poškus	-	Documentary	
Bezmiegs	Vladimirs Leščovs	-	Animation	
Go Active!			Short comedy	Greek language
Waterbomb for the Fat Tomcat (Ūdensbumba resnajam runcim)	Varis Brasla	Baiba Broka; Jānis Paukštello; Artūrs Skrastiņš	Family	Lielais Kristaps in 2005; Won award at the Chicago Children's Film Festival
2005
Augstuma robeža	Una Celma	Rēzija Kalniņa; Zane Daudziņa; Jānis Paukštello	Drama	
Reiz bija Sibīrija	Dzintra Geka	-	Documentary	
Sveiciens no Sibīrijas	Dzintra Geka	-	Documentary	
2006
Ķīlnieks	Laila Pakalniņa	Branko Zavrsan; Kristaps Mednis; Jēkabs Nākums	Comedy	
Tumšie brieži	Viesturs Kairišs	Kristīne Krūze; Elita Kļaviņa; Juris Žagars	Drama	
2007
Berklāvisms		-	Documentary	
Čiža acīm	Edmunds Jansons; Nora Ikstena	-	Animation/Documentary	
Fritsud ja blondiinid	Arbo Tammiksaar	Tõnu Aav; Uldis Lieldidžs; Algimantas Masiulis	Documentary	
Kuģis	Egils Mednis	-	Animation	
Midsummer Madness	Alexander Hahn	Maria de Medeiros; Dominique Pinon; Gundars Āboliņš	Comedy	
Monotonija	Juris Poškus	Iveta Pole; Varis Piņķis; Madara Melberga; Artuss Kaimiņš		
Defenders of Riga (Rīgas sargi)	Aigars Grauba	Jānis Reinis; Uldis Dumpis; Elita Kļaviņa	War	
Sirreālisma gultā	Ilona Brūvere	-	Documentary	
Spēlēju, dancoju	Roze Stiebra	-	Animation	
Veterinārārsts	Signe Baumane	-	Animation	
Vienkārši pops	Andis Mizišs	-	Documentary	
Vogelfrei	Jānis Kalējs; Jānis Putniņš	Kārlis Spravniks; Ints Teterovskis; Igors Suhoverhovs	Drama	Lielais Kristaps in 2007
Nerunā par to	Una Celma	Santa Didžus; Rēzija Kalniņa; Ģirts Ķesteris	Drama	
2008
Akmeņi	Laila Pakalniņa	Guna Zariņa; Leonīds Grabovskis; Pēteris Krilovs		
Amatieris	Jānis Nords	Edgars Samītis; Ksenija Sundejeva; Regīna Razuma	Drama	
Bekons, sviests un mana mamma	Ilze Burkovska-Jakobsena	-	Documentary	
Jauna suga	Ēvalds Lācis; Māris Brinkmanis	-	Animation	
Klucis - nepareizais latvietis	Pēteris Krilovs	-	Documentary	
Kur pazudis Elvis?	Una Celma	Harijs Spanovskis; Ieva Pļavniece; Zane Daudziņa	Comedy, Adventure	
Par dzimtenīti	Māris Maskalāns; Laila Pakalniņa	-	Documentary	
The Soviet Story	Edvīns Šnore	-	Documentary	English
Trejādas saules	Jānis Ozoliņš-Ozols	Vaira Vīķe-Freiberga	Documentary	
Varka kru	Viesturs Kairišs	Mārtiņš Rubenis	Documentary	
Velna Fudži	Kārlis Vītols	-	Animation	
2009
Dzeguze un viņas 12 vīri	Roze Stiebra	-	Animation	
Dzimis Rīgā	Gints Grūbe; Dāvis Sīmanis	-	Documentary	
Laimes luteklis	Rūta Celma	-	Documentary	
Ļeva Tolstoja ļaunais gars	Mārcis Bauze - Krastiņš; Ernests Stulps			
Mazie laupītāji	Armands Zvirbulis	Zane Leimane; Gustavs Voldemārs Vilsons; Gundars Āboliņš	Comedy, Crime, Family	
Medības	Andis Mizišs	Guna Zariņa; Rolands Zagorskis; Andris Keišs	Drama	
Spārni un Airi	Vladimirs Leščovs	-	Animation	
Vai viegli augt?	Aija Bley	-	Documentary, Short	
Viens reiz viens	Gints Grūbe; Daina Rašenbauma	-	Documentary	
Irēnas Sendleres drosmīgā sirds	-	Vilis Daudziņš	-	

== 2010s ==
Original title	International title (or translation in English)	Director	Cast	Genre	Notes
2010
Amaya	Hong Kong Confidential	Māris Martinsons	Kaori Momoi; Andrius Mamontovas; Kristīne Nevarauska	Drama, Comedy	
Rūdolfa mantojums	Rudolf's Gold	Jānis Streičs	Romualds Ancāns; Rēzija Kalniņa; Artūrs Skrastiņš	Drama, Comedy	
Kā tev klājas, Rūdolf Ming?		Roberts Rubīns		Portrait documentary	
Pretrunīgā vēsture	(Controversial history)	Inara Kolmane, Uldis Nieburgs		Documentary	The documentary is about different historical narratives regarding World War II and the occupation of Latvia; as held by Latvians, and Russians and the Jews in Latvia.
Seržanta Lapiņa atgriešanās	Return of Sergeant Lapins	Gatis Šmits	Andris Keišs; Guna Zariņa; Gatis Gāga	Drama, Comedy	
Ģimenes lietas	-	Andris Gauja		Documentary, Biography, Drama	
2011
Monsieur Tauriņš	Monsieur Taurins	Alexander Hahn	Gundars Āboliņš; Markus Boestfleisch; Angelina Noa	Comedy	
Dancis pa trim	-	Arvīds Krievs	Mārtiņš Freimanis; Kristīne Nevarauska; Jānis Vingris	Drama, History	
Kolka Cool	Kolka Cool	Juris Poškus	Iveta Pole; Artuss Kaimiņš; Andris Keišs	Drama, Comedy	
Nāve Tev	Death to You	Juris Poškus	Iveta Pole; Artuss Kaimiņš; Andris Keišs; Aigars Apinis; Varis Piņķis	Drama, Comedy	
2012
Sapņu komanda 1935	Dream Team 1935	Aigars Grauba	Intars Rešetins; Andris Bulis; Inga Alsiņa	Drama, History, Sport	
Cilvēki tur	Cilveki tur;Lyudi tam	Aiks Karapetjans	Ilya Scherbakov; Mikhail Razumovsky; Andris Gross	Crime, Drama	
Mona	Mona	Ināra Kolmane	Saulius Balandis; Kristīne Beļicka; Lauris Subatnieks	Drama	
Golfa straume zem ledus kalna	Gulf Stream Under the Iceberg	Yevgeni Pashkevich		Drama	
2013
Mammu, es tevi mīlu	Mother I Love You	Janis Nords			
2014
Izlaiduma gads	The Lesson	Andris Gauja			
Modris	Modris	Juris Kursietis		Drama	
Oki - okeāna vidū	Oki - in the middle of the ocean	Māris Martinsons	Andris Bulis; Kaori Momoi; Hannah Levien	Drama about a Latvian worker in USA	Filmed in California, United States
2015
Ausma	Dawn	Laila Pakalniņa			
Ručs un Norie	Ruch and Norie	Ināra Kolmane			
2016
Pelnu sanatorija	Exiled	Dāvis Sīmanis	Ulrich Matthes	Documentary	Award Lielais Kristaps in 2016. Best Actor for performance - Ulrich Matthes
Es esmu šeit	Mellow Mud	Renārs Vimba		Feature film	
Saules staros	—	Vitālijs Manskis		Documentary film	Filmed in North Korea
Melānijas hronika	The Chronicles of Melanie	Viesturs Kairišs	Sabine Timoteo	Documentary, Feature film	
Svingeri	—	Andrejs Ēķis	Ģirts Ķesteris; Elīna Vāne; Intars Rešetins; Kristīne Nevarauska; Jānis Jubalts; Kristīne Belicka	comedy	(18+)
2017
Tas, ko viņi neredz	—		Andris Keišs	comedy	(18+)
Pārgājiens	—	Raimonds Elbakjans	Raimonds Elbakjans; Nils Ušakovs	Shortfilm	Documentary about the mayor of Riga
Atbrīvošanas diena	Liberation Day	Uģis Olte, Morten Traavik		Documentary film	Norwegian, Slovenian and Latvian film, filmed in North Korea
Ātrie igauņu puiši	The dissidents	Jaak Kilmi	Märt Pius; Karl-Andreas Kalmet; Veiko Porkanen; Esko Salminen	Comedy	Estonian and Latvian co production
Maģiskais kimono	魔法の着物; Magic kimono	Māris Martinsons	Kaori Momoi; Issey Ogata; Artūrs Skrastiņš; Mārtiņš Sirmais; Alise Polačenko; Andris Keišs members of band Brainstorm	Comedy	Japanese and Latvian co production
Astoņas zvaigznes	(Eight stars)	Askolds Saulītis	-	Documentary about Latvian Riflemens	The author of the script : Dainis Īvāns, Askolds Saulītis. Latvian films for centenary of Republic of Latvia
Vectēvs, kas bīstamāks par datoru	(Grandfather more dangerous than a computer)	Varis Brasla	Markuss Jānis Eglītis, Eva Ozola, Mārtiņš Vilsons, Akvelīna Līvmane, Mārtiņš Meiers, Uldis Dumpis, Uldis Anže, Vizma Kalme, Lauris Dzelzītis, Inese Pudža	Comedy, family film	Latvian films for centenary of Republic of Latvia
Pirmdzimtais	Firstborn	Aiks Karapetjans	Maija Doveika; Kaspars Znotiņš; Kaspars Zāle	Action thriller	Latvian films for centenary of Republic of Latvia
Ievainotais jātnieks	(The Wounded Rider)	Ilona Brūvere	Imants Strads Dārta Daneviča; Mārtiņš Brūveris; Ieva Aleksandrova-Eklone; Marta Grase; Dainis Gaidelis; Lauris Subatnieks	Documentary about Freedom Monument of Latvia and its author Kārlis Zāle	Latvian films for centenary of Republic of Latvia
Paraugprāva	Showcase	Reinis Spaile	-	Documentary about investigation of Zolitūde shopping centre roof collapse	Runed in LTV
2018
Nameja gredzens	The Pagan King	Aigars Grauba	Edvin Endre, James Bloor, Aistė Diržiūtė, Andris Keišs, Artūrs Skrastiņš, Dainis Grūbe, Lauris Dzelzītis, Gints Andžāns, Ivo Martinsons, Egons Dombrovskis, Jānis Āmanis, Kaspars Kārkliņš, Armands Ikalis, Anete Berķe, Elīna Vāne	Historical fiction action film about Semigallian duke Namejs and his conducted Semigallian freedom struggles against the Crusades.	Latvian films for centenary of Republic of Latvia
Kriminālās ekselences fonds	(The fund of criminal excellency)	Oskars Rupenheits	Lauris Kļaviņš, Andris Daugaviņš, Jana Rubīna, Juris Riekstiņš, Māris Mičerevskis	First Latvian criminal comedy.	Filmed only with resources from donors.
Paradīze '89	(Paradise '89)	Madara Dišlere	Magda Lote Auziņa, Marta Ģertrūde Auzāne, Līva Ločmele, Evelīna Ozola, Inga Apine, Gatis Gāga, Kaspars Gods, Ivars Krasts, Guna Zariņa	Film about the events of the 1989 Baltic Way, Dissolution of the Soviet Union and the restoration of independence of Republic of Latvia through the eyes of two sisters - Paula and Laura and their cousins.	Latvian films for centenary of Republic of Latvia
Turpinājums	(The continue)	Ivars Seleckis		Documentary	Film about five kids and their view of events in Latvia and politics. There will be continue of film after seven years. Latvian films for centenary of Republic of Latvia
Blēži	(The cheaters)	Andrejs Ēķis	Intars Rešetins, Rēzija Kalniņa, Ralfs Eilands, Ieva Florence, Leonarda Ķestere, Sandis Pēcis, Jurģis Spulenieks, Ivo Martinsons	Comedy	(18+)
Saule brauca debesīs	(The sun was driving in the sky)	Roze Stiebra	Kaspars Znotiņš, Lelde Dreimane, Ance Strazda, Guna Zariņa, Vilis Daudziņš, Zane Daudziņa, Jana Čivžele, Ainārs Ančevskis, Alise Danovska, Gatis Gāga, Silvija Bitere, Marija Linarte, Reinis Boters, Dita Lūriņa-Egliena, Egīls Melbārdis, Ance Kukule, Sandis Runge, Meinards Liepiņš	Animation	Latvian films for centenary of Republic of Latvia
Kurts Fridrihsons	(Kurts Fridrihsons)	Dzintra Geka-Vaska		Documentary about Kurts Fridrihsons	Latvian films for centenary of Republic of Latvia
Mērijas ceļojums	()	Kristīne Želve	Daiga Kažociņa, Marina Janaus	Documentary	Latvian films for centenary of Republic of Latvia
Lustrum	(Lustrum)	Gints Grūbe		Documentary about KGB activities in Latvia and lustration	Latvian films for centenary of Republic of Latvia
Laika tilti	()	Audrius Stonys, Kristīne Briede		Documentary	Latvian, Lithuanian and Estonian co-production. Latvian films for centenary of Republic of Latvia
Homo Novus	(Homo Novus )	Anna Viduleja	Igors Šelegovskis, Kristīne Krūze, Kaspars Znotiņš, Andris Keišs, Kaspars Zvīgulis, Agnese Cīrule, Aurēlija Anužīte-Lauciņa, Nikolajs Korobovs, Vilis Daudziņš, Guna Zariņa, Ģirts Krūmiņš, Andrejs Žagars, Baiba Broka, Imants Strads, Regīna Razuma, Gundars Āboliņš, Ivars Puga, Kaspars Kambala, Mārtiņš Vilsons, Ģirts Ēcis, Intars Busulis, Juris Bartkevičs	Historical drama	Latvian films for centenary of Republic of Latvia
Baltu Ciltis	()	Raitis Ābele, Lauris Ābele		Documentary	Latvian films for centenary of Republic of Latvia
Tēvs Nakts	(The Mover)	Dāvis Sīmanis	Artūrs Skrastiņš, Ilze Blauberga, Leonīds Lencs, Matīss Kipļuks	Film about Žanis Lipke	Latvian films for centenary of Republic of Latvia
Bille	(Bille)	Ināra Kolmane	Rūta Kronberga, Elīna Vāne, Artūrs Skrastiņš, Lolita Cauka, Gundars Āboliņš, Lilita Ozoliņa, Guna Zariņa		Latvian films for centenary of Republic of Latvia
2019
1906	(1906)	Gatis Šmits	Mārtiņš Kalita, Inese Pudža, Kaspars Zvīgulis, Toms Auniņš, Gatis Gāga, Lauris Dzelzītis, Inese Kučinska, Kaspars Dumburs, Vladislavs Nastavševs		Latvian films for centenary of Republic of Latvia
Jēkabs, Mimmi un runājošie suņi	(Jacob, Mimmi and the Talking Dogs)	Edmunds Jansons	Andris Keišs, Gatis Gāga, Kaspars Znotiņš, Nora Džumā, Eduards Olekts	Adventure	Latvian films for centenary of Republic of Latvia

== 2020s ==
2020s
Original title	International title (or title in english)	Director	Caste	Genre	Notes
Spogulī	In the Mirror	Laila Pakalniņa	Madlēna Valdberga, Lauris Dzelzītis, Elza Leimane, Gatis Gāga, Kaspars Gods, Mikolas Vildžiūnas	Comedy, Fantasy	A modern, absurdist retelling of Snow White set in a CrossFit gym, exploring themes of vanity and competition through a contemporary lens
Bedre	The Pit	Dace Pūce	Damirs Onackis, Luīze Birkenberga, Agnese Budovska, Jānis Krūmiņš	Coming-of-age	A 10-year-old boy named Markuss faces the challenges of fitting into a rural community after a troubling incident, leading to a journey of self-discovery and understanding
Pilsēta pie upes	The Sign Painter	Viestur Kairish	Dāvis Suharevskis, Gundars Āboliņš, Agnese Cīrule, Juozas Budraitis, Brigita Cmuntova	Drama	Set during World War II, the film follows Ansis, a young sign painter whose aspirations are disrupted by successive occupations of his Latvian hometown
Gads pirms kara	The Year Before the War	Dāvis Sīmanis	Petr Buchta, Rudolfs Apse, Lauris Dzelzitis, Gints Gravelis, Eduards Johansons, Edgars Kaufelds, Ģirts Ķesteris, Daniel Sidon, Inga Silina, Igors Jakimenko	Historical, Thriller, Surrealism	
My Love Affair with Marriage	My Love Affair with Marriage	Signe Baumane	Dagmara Dominczyk, Michele Pawk, Matthew Modine, Cameron Monaghan, Stephen Lang, Trio Limonāde	Comedy, Musical	A semi-autobiographical animated film that follows Zelma's 23-year quest for love and marriage, blending personal narrative with musical elements and scientific insights into human behavior
Straume	Flow	Gints Zilbalodis	N/A	Adventure, Fantasy	First Latvian film to win an Academy Award (Best Animated Feature) and a Golden Globe.
Dieva suns	Dog of God	Lauris Ābele and Raitis Ābele	Regnārs Vaivars, Einars Repše, Jurģis Spulenieks, Agate Krista, Kristians Kareļins, Armands Berģis	Comedy, Horror, Surrealism	
