= Lielais Kristaps =

Latvian film award

- Awarded for: Excellence in cinematic achievements
- Country: Latvia
- Presented by: Latvian Filmmakers Union, National Film Centre of Latvia., Ministry of Culture of Latvia
- First award: 1977
- Website: lielaiskristaps.lv

Lielais Kristaps is the highest award given in Latvian cinema. Established in 1977, it is given out at the Latvian National Film Festival.

Due to different reasons, the festival has not been held in 1992, 1994 to 1995, 1997 and 1999, and was held biannually from 2001 to 2009, with no festival being held in 2010, 2011 and 2013. Since 2014, it was held again every year.

== Past winners ==
=== Best Film Categories ===
Year	Feature Film	Documentary	Animated Feature	Short Film
1977	Puika (D: Aivars Freimanis)	not awarded	not awarded	not awarded
1978	Theater (Teātris) (D: Jānis Streičs)	Sieviete, kuru gaida (D: Ivars Seleckis)	not awarded	not awarded
1979	not awarded	Četri meklē miljonu (D: Ansis Epners)	not awarded	not awarded
1980	Novēli man lidojumam nelabvēlīgu laiku (D: Varis Brasla)	Saruna ar karalieni (D: Rolands Kalniņš)	Kā es braucu Ziemeļmeitas lūkoties (D: Roze Stiebra)	not awarded
1981	A Limousine the Colour of Midsummer's Eve (Limuzīns Jāņu nakts krāsā) (D: Jānis Streičs)	not awarded	Bimini (Arnolds Burovs)	not awarded
1982	not awarded	Strēlnieku zvaigznājs (D: Juris Podnieks)	not awarded	not awarded
1983	not awarded	Mekleju virieti (D: Ivars Seleckis)	Kabata (D: Roze Stiebra)	not awarded
1984	not awarded	not awarded	Sapnis (D: Arnolds Burovs)	not awarded
1985	Emil's Mischiefs (Emīla nedarbi) (D: Varis Brasla)	Veļ Sīzifs akmeni (D: Juris Podnieks)	Fantadroms, (episode Sāls) (D:Ansis Bērziņš)	not awarded
1986	Saulessvece (D: Lūcija Ločmele)	Is It Easy to Be Young? (Vai viegli būt jaunam?) (D: Juris Podnieks)	Trilogy Sapnis, Pēdējā lapa, Princese un puma (D: Arnolds Burovs)	not awarded
1987	not awarded	Gaismēnas (D: Arnis Akmeņlauks)	Bruņurupuči (D: Ansis Bērziņš)	not awarded
1988	Par mīlestību pašreiz nerunāsim (We Won't Talk Now of Love) (D: Varis Brasla)	The Crossroad (Šķērsiela) (D: Ivars Seleckis)	Skatāmpanti (D: Roze Stiebra)	not awarded
1989	Dzīvīte (D: Aivars Freimanis)	Izlūkdienesta priekšnieks (D: Romualds Pipars)	not awarded	not awarded
1990	Eve's Garden of Paradise (Ievas paradīzes dārzs) (D: Arvīds Krievs)	Es esmu latvietis (D: Ansis Epners)	Rezgalības I (D: Jānis Cimermanis)	not awarded
1991	The Child of Man (Cilvēka bērns) (D: Jānis Streičs)	Krustceļš (D: Juris Podnieks)	not awarded	not awarded
1993	Būris (D: Ansis Epners)	Naivie (D: Dainis Kļava)	Ness un Nesija (D: Roze Stiebra)	not awarded
1996	not awarded	not awarded	Munks un Lemijs (D: Nils Skapāns)	not awarded
1998	Izpostītā ligzda (D: Uldis Pūcītis, Armands Zvirbulis)	Debesu sala (D: Ivo Kalpenieks)	Pasaciņas. Miega vilcieniņš (D: Roze Stiebra)	not awarded
2000	Kāzas (D: Viestur Kairish)	Jaunie laiki Šķērsielā (D: Ivars Seleckis)	The Two Imps (Velniņi) (D: Inga Riba)	Latvietis pūš pīlītes (D: Agnese Bule)
2001	Pa ceļam aizejot (Leaving By The Way) (D: Viestur Kairish)	Rīga. Desmit gadus pēc (D: Arta Biseniece	The Unusual Rigans (Neparastie rīdzinieki) (D: Roze Stiebra)	Klupiens (D: Andis Mizišs)
2003	Pitons (D: Laila Pakalniņa)	Bet stunda nāk (D: Juris Poškus	My Grandfather's Honey (Vectēva medus) (D: Vladimirs Ļeščovs)	not awarded
2005	Waterbomb for the Fat Tomcat (Ūdensbumba resnajam runcim) (D: Varis Brasla)	Tārps (D: Andis Mizišs)	Insomnia (Bezmiegs) (D: Vladimirs Ļeščovs)	Aģents iemīlas (D: Gatis Šmits)
2007	Vogelfrei (D: Jānis Kalējs, Gatis Šmits, Jānis Putniņš, Anna Viduleja)	My Husband Andrei Sakharov (Mans vīrs Andrejs Saharovs) (D: Ināra Kolmane)	Lotte from Gadgetville (Lote no Izgudrotāju ciema) (D: Heiki Ernits, Janno Põldma)	Ūdens (D: Laila Pakalniņa)
2009	Loss (Nevajadzīgie ļaudis) (D: Māris Martinsons)	Bekons, sviests un mana Mamma (My Mother's Farm) (D: Ilze Burkovska-Jakobsena)	Wings and Oars (Spārni un airi) (D: Vladimirs Ļeščovs)	Apsēstība (D: Ivars Tontegode)
2011	Gulf Stream Under the Iceberg (Golfa straume zem ledus kalna) (D: Jevgeņijs Paškēvičs)	Documentalist (Dokumentālists) (D: Ivars Zviedris, Inese Kļava)	To Swallow a Toad (Norīt krupi) (D: Jurģis Krāsons)	Filma (D: Ivo Briedis, Māra Ķimele)
2014	Mother, I Love You (Mammu, es tevi mīlu) (D: Jānis Nords)	Uz spēles Latvija (D: Pēteris Krilovs)	Rocks in My Pockets (Akmeņi manās kabatās) (D: Signe Baumane)	Mazliet ilgāk (D: Stanislavs Tokalovs)
2015	not awarded	Ruch and Norie (Ručs un Norie) (D: Ināra Kolmane)	Tower (Tornis) (D: Māris Putniņš)	Pa Pa (D: Valērijs Oļehno)
2016	Mellow Mud (Es esmu šeit) (D: Renārs Vimba)	Under the Sun (Saules staros) (D: Vitaly Mansky)	Mīnotaurs (D: Kārlis Vītols)	Dārznieks (D: Madara Dišlere)
2017	The Chronicles of Melanie (Melānijas hronika) (D: Viestur Kairish)	Liberation Day (D: Ugis Olte, Morten Traavik)	Pigtail and Mr. Sleeplessness (Bize un Negula) (D: Demunds Jansons)	not awarded
2018	Bille (D: Inara Kolmane)	Bridges of Time (D: Kristine Briede, Audrius Stonys)	not awarded	Electrician's Day (Elektriķa diena) (D: Vladimir Leschiov)
2019	Oleg (D: Juris Kursietis)	Putin's Witnesses (Svideteli Putina) (D: Gabriela Bussmann)	Away (D: Gints Zilbalodis)	not awarded

=== Acting Categories ===
Year	Actor	Actress	Supporting Actor	Supporting Actress
1977-1985	not awarded			
1986	Juris Žagars (Dubultnieks)	Zane Jančevska (Bailes)	Valdemārs Zandbergs (Bailes)	Gunta Grīva (Saulessvece)
1987	Alvis Hermanis (Fotogrāfija ar sievieti un mežakuili)	Zane Jančevska (2.) (Aija)	Ivars Kalniņš (Fotogrāfija ar sievieti un mežakuili)	not awarded
1988	Tinu Karks (Viss kārtībā)	Ilze Rūdolfa (Par mīlestību pašreiz nerunāsim)	Valentīns Skulme (Viktoria)	Vizma Kvēpa (Par mīlestību pašreiz nerunāsim)
1989	Eduards Pāvuls (Zītaru dzimta)	Indra Briķe (Dzīvīte)	not awarded	not awarded
1990	not awarded	Baiba Broka (Valsis mūža garumā)	not awarded	not awarded
1993	Armands Reinfelds (Varmācības meditācija)	not awarded	not awarded	not awarded
1996	Uldis Pūcītis (Figūras)	Dace Bonāte; Ligzda)	not awarded	not awarded
1998	Artūrs Skrastiņš (The Mills of Fate)	Lidija Kovtuna (Norēķinu stunda)	not awarded	not awarded
2000	Andris Keišs (Kāzas)	Nora Veignere (Anna)	not awarded	not awarded
2001	Renārs Kaupers (The Mystery of the Old Parish House)	Rēzija Kalniņa (Labās rokas)	not awarded	not awarded
2003	Voldemārs Karpačs (The Last Soviet Movie)	Kristīne Nevarauska (Sauja ložu)	not awarded	Ilze Pukinska (Pitons)
2005	Rūdolfs Plēpis (Baltais zvērs)	Akvelīna Līvmane (Rudens rozes)	Janis Paukstello (Augstuma robeža)	not awarded
2007	Juris Žagars (Tumšie brieži)	Iveta Pole (Monotonija)	not awarded	Regīna Razuma (Rūgtais vīns)
2009	not awarded	not awarded	Rolands Zagorskis (Medības)	Ināra Slucka (Defenders of Riga)
2012	Romualds Ancāns (Rudolf's Gold)	Iveta Pole (2.) (Kolka Cool)	Aigars Apinis (Kolka Cool)	Venta Vecumniece (Rudolf's Gold)
2012	Andris Keišs (2.) (Return of Sergeant Lapins)	Iveta Pole (2.) (Kolka Cool)	Aigars Apinis (Kolka Cool)	Venta Vecumniece (Rudolf's Gold)
2014	Jānis Āmanis (Dream Team 1935)	Vita Vārpiņa (Mother, I Love You)	Ziedonis Lochmelis (Džimlai rūdi rallallā!)	Rēzija Kalniņa (2.) (Modris)
2015	Andris Keišs (3.) (Pa Pa)	Guna Zariņa (Ordinary People)	not awarded	not awarded
2016	Ulrich Matthes (Exiled)	Elīna Vaska (Mellow Mud)	Andris Keišs (4.) (Dawn)	Liena Smukste (Dawn)
2017	Kaspars Znotiņš (Firstborn)	Sabine Timoteo (The Chronicles of Melanie)	Uldis Dumpis (Grandpa More Dangerous Than Computer)	Vizma Kalme (Grandpa More Dangerous Than Computer)
2018	Vilis Daudziņš (Foam at the Mouth)	Elita Kļaviņa (Riga (Take 1))	Andris Daugaviņš (The Foundation of Criminal Excellence)	Ilze Blauberga (The Mover)
2019	Jēkabs Reinis (Red Forest)	Kristīne Nevarauska (2.) (Nothing can stop us now)	Dawid Ogrodnik (Oleg)	Ieva Puķe (Jelgava 94)

== See also ==
- Christopher Award
