= Artuss Kaimiņš =

Latvian actor and politician

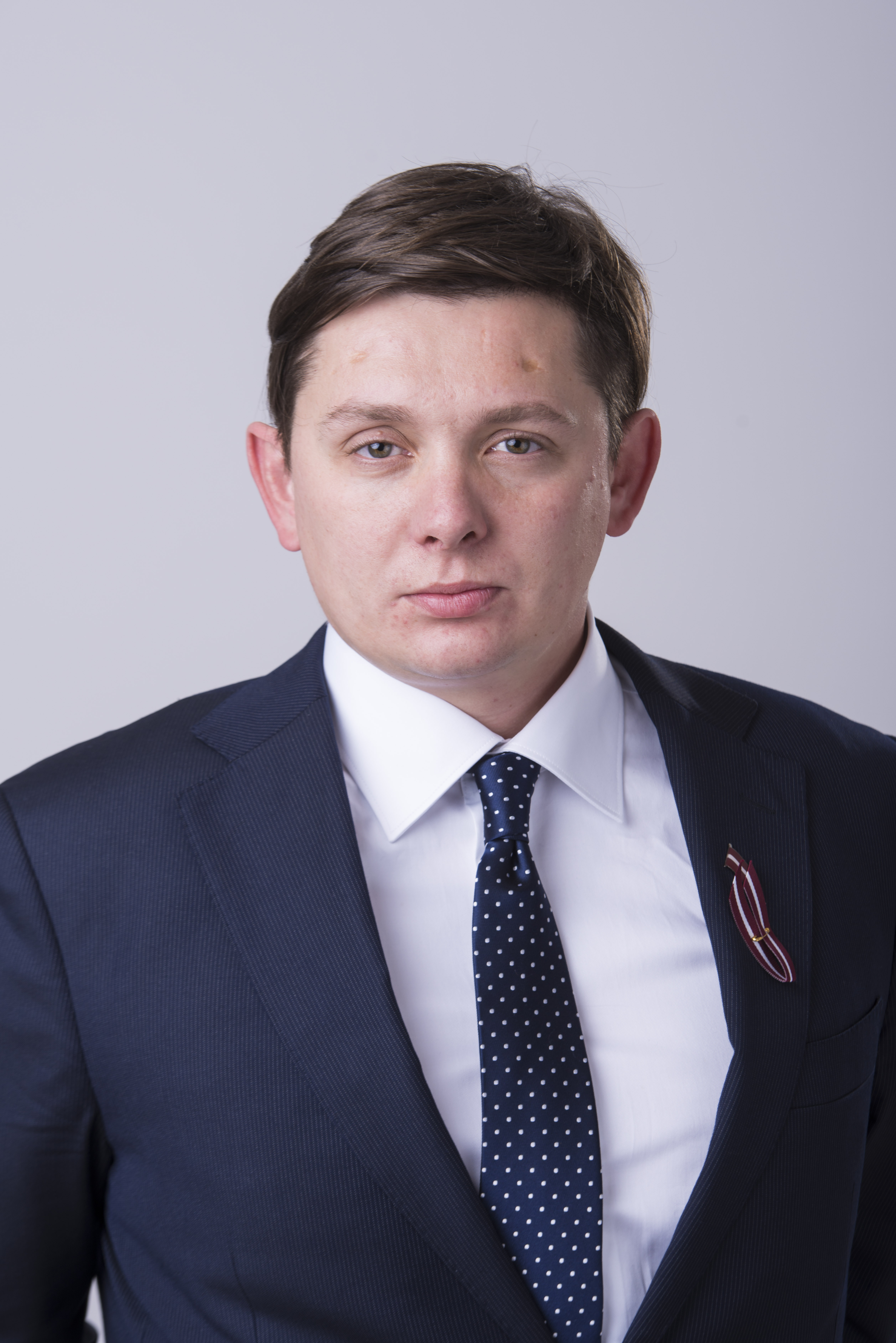
- Artuss Kaimiņš in 2014

Member of the Saeima

Personal details
- Born: November 3, 1980 (age 44); Latvian SSR, USSR (now Latvia)
- Political party: Latvian Association of Regions (?-2015); Who Owns the State? (2016-2020)
- Parent(s): Māris Mūrnieks, Liene Kaimiņa
- Occupation: Politician, radio host, actor

Artuss Kaimiņš (born Arturs Kaimiņš on November 3, 1980, in Bauska) is a Latvian actor, politician and radio host. He is known as a Boom FM radio host. He is a well-known controversial figure in Latvian politics and culture. He previously served as leader of the political party Who Owns the State?.

Since 2014 he has been actively involved in politics. He is currently a member of Latvian Parliament. Originally elected at the 2014 elections as a member of the Latvian Association of Regions, he left the party in December 2015 to serve as an independent MP. On May 3, 2016, he founded his own political movement, Who Owns the State? (KPV LV), which later evolved into a political party. Elected on the KPV LV ticket at the 2018 elections, he was expelled from the party's parliamentary faction in January 2020.

== Early life ==
Kaimiņš is a graduate of Riga Secondary School No 64 and the Latvian Academy of Culture. His father is attorney Maris Mūrnieks. His grandmother, Baiba Kaimiņa (born December 7, 1937, in Igate), was a gymnast, as was his mother, Liene Kaimiņa.

While Kaimiņš was an actor, he experienced a major car crash, in which two actors died. Three more of them, including Kaimiņš, had serious injuries.

He changed his birth name in 2015 from Arturs to Artuss.

== Entertainment career ==
=== Film and theater ===
Artuss Kaimiņš has been involved in a total of 16 films, as either actor or director. Some of the most notable ones that he has acted been in are ‘’Kolka Cool’’, ‘’Monotonija’’, ‘’Daudz laimes!’’. He has also acted in the Valmiera Drama Theater and in the Latvian National Theater.

While Artuss Kaimiņš was a National Theatre actor, he went to the United States of America to pursue his career there. However, he subsequently changed his mind about acting in the US. "I did not get far in America. The peak of my career there was in the eighth row, the ninth from the left in some series. I worked in Los Angeles for six months, and just for the same amount of time in New York City previously, and again – I did not clean the streets, but I worked as an actor." – Kaimiņš explained why he believes he has a better chance of reaching his full potential in Latvia and Russia than in the USA.

=== Radio host ===
Kaimiņš has been a host of the radio programme ‘’Dog Kennel’’ (‘’Suņu Būda’’) on the station Boom FM. With this programme, he gained widespread recognition in Latvia. The host said that his aim with the broadcast is to awaken common sense in Latvian society and to stop lobbyists from influencing politicians. He has hosted a wide range of guests, including ex-president Vaira Vīķe-Freiberga, ex-prime minister Ivars Godmanis and various Latvian pop-culture stars. In these episodes, Kaimiņš tends to be controversial and calls out all of the flaws and problems that he sees with the establishment or the person he is interviewing.

== Career in politics ==
=== Latvian Association of Regions ===
Artuss Kaimiņš was elected in 2014 as the person with the most votes for an individual in Latvia. He ran as a member of the Latvian Association of Regions when he was elected to the 12th Latvian Parliament. The next year, he left the party for several reasons. According to Kaimiņš, he objected to his party's potential endorsement of Solvita Āboltiņa for the post of Prime Minister and certain party policies. He himself has also said that the personal intentions of other members of the Latvian Association of Regions were not beneficial for the party and came before all policies and reasoning.

Kaimiņš is known for having a camera with him most of the time. He captures what happens in the parliament and publishes it on his YouTube channel, showing his perceived flaws in the Latvian Parliament.

=== Who Owns the State? ===
On May 3, 2016 he started his own new political movement Who Owns the State? (Kam pieder valsts, abbreviated as KPV LV).

This party is characterised as anti-establishment populist. Polls show that the average voter for this party would be a Latvian speaking young adult male.

Kaimiņš states that KPV LV is not a populist party, citing a specific programme, which he briefly describes as follows: "Our party is a party that defends the interests of Latvian taxpayers."

There has been criticism of the party from ex-members who have chosen to leave KPV LV. Journalist Ilmārs Poikāns, who was one of the more well-known members of the party, revealed that he did not like Kaimiņš's style of leadership. Certain promises were broken, for instance, the lawyer Aldis Gobzems was nominated to run for Mayor of Riga in the municipal elections, even though Kaimiņš had said that he would not be nominated by the party.

In January 2020, Kaimiņš was expelled from the KPV LV parliamentary faction owing to alleged disloyalty to the party line.

== Legal troubles ==
Coming back from a business trip to Lisbon in 2016, Kaimiņš was accused of behaving aggressively towards a flight attendant when he complained that announcements concerning arrangements for transit passengers were being made only in English and Russian and not Latvian, even though they were in Latvian airspace at a time when Latvia held the rotating Presidency of the Council of the European Union. He videoed the conversation and refused to delete the film, at which point he was informed that the police would be alerted. When the plane landed, got a chat with a flight attendant about the languages on a video and when she asked him to delete it, he refused. When the plane had landed in Riga, Kaimiņš was indeed met by the police and was briefly detained, although he insists he voluntarily reported to the police.

In 2014, following the annual Latvian theatre awards ceremony Spēlmaņu nakts a press photographer pressed charges against Kaimiņš, accusing him of humiliation and physical and verbal harassment. The case was brought before the Ethics Committee of the Saeima, before which he has also been summoned subsequently. Artuss Kaimiņš has repeatedly been blamed for promoting alcohol in his video blogs and interviews as a radio host in Boom FM. The radio station is not registered as a media outlet so it is not regulated by the government.

On 21 June 2018, the Saeima Mandates, Ethics and Submissions Committee granted permission for Kaimiņš to be detained and searched with regard to an ongoing corruption investigation.
