= Viestur Kairish =

Latvian director (born 1971)

- Viesturs Kairišs
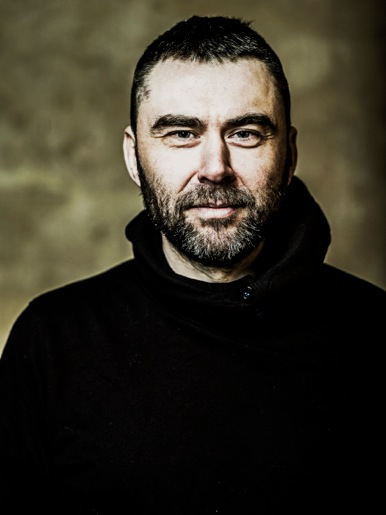
- Born: Viesturs Kairišs; 30 January 1971 (age 55); Rīga, Latvian SSR
- Education: Latvian Academy of Culture
- Occupations: Director of opera, film, and theatre
- Website: www.kairish.com

Viestur Kairish (Latvian: Viesturs Kairišs) is a Latvian opera, film, and theatre director. He has made a successful career in Latvia and Germany as a director of operas, and his films and plays have toured in many European festivals.

== Early life and education ==
Viestur Kairish graduated from the Latvian Academy of Culture as a theatre and film director in 1997.

== Career ==
=== Stage ===
Kairish was appointed at the New Riga Theatre as a resident stage director. Since then he has set critically acclaimed plays both in Latvia and abroad. Several of his productions toured international festivals and venues, including the Wiener Festwochen (Hotel Europe), the Hebbel am Ufer (The Serpent), the Festival d’Avignon (Hotel Europe), and the Bonner Biennale (The Dark Deer, Hotel Europe).

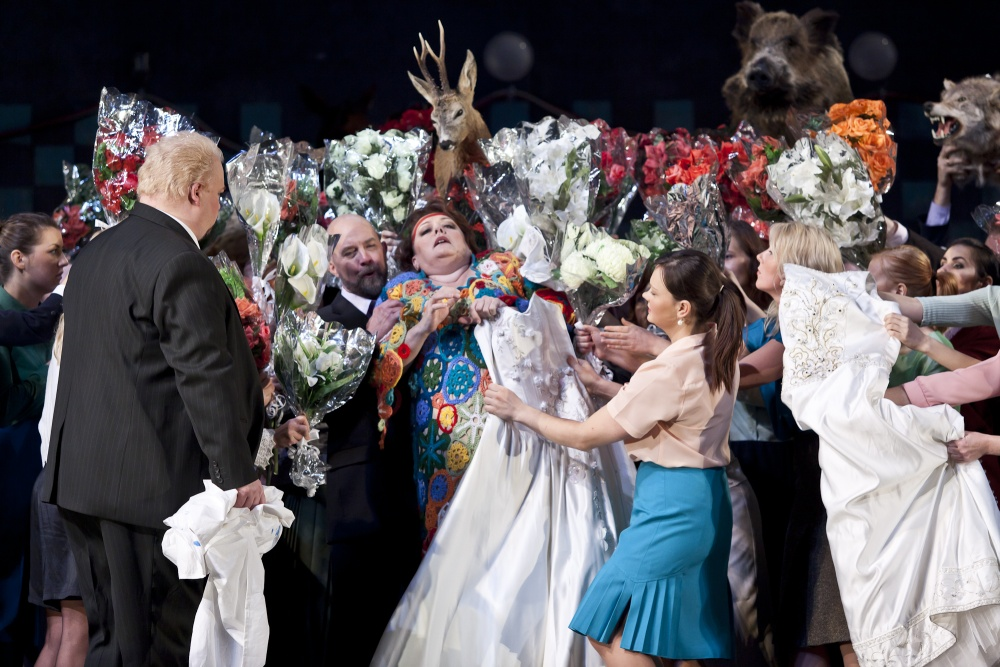
Moment from Wagner's opera "Götterdämmerung" by Viestur Kairsh at the Latvian National Opera

He debuted in opera directing with Peter Tchaikovsky's Eugene Onegin at the Latvian National Opera, receiving the Latvian Great Music Award for the Best Opera Production in 1999. Soon after, he staged Mozart's Die Zauberflöte at the Latvian National Opera in 2001 which later on was transformed into the short-movie artwork for the 42nd Venice Biennale.

He joined Wagner's Der Ring des Nibelungen project at the Latvian National Opera with Die Walküre in 2007. He set the last three operas from the cycle which received positive reviews in respectable music and opera journals.

The successful work on Wagner's operas opened for Kairish an international career in opera staging. He has been invited to Komische Oper Berlin, Oper Köln and Staatstheater Darmstadt. His debut in Germany, the production of Britten's A Midsummer Night's Dream with Kristiina Poska conducting, was acknowledged by The Financial Times as a "worthy contribution to a fledgling Britten tradition for Germany" and received many other positive reviews. Work on Weber's Der Freischütz with Markus Stenz conducting at Oper Köln was acclaimed success as well both from the critics and public, same as the production of Verdi's Macbeth with Will Humburg conducting at Staatstheater Darmstadt.

Currently, Kairish is working on Arturs Maskats' new opera Valentina together with Modestas Pitrenas as a conductor at the Latvian National Opera with scheduled shows at Deutsche Oper Berlin.

=== Films ===
Kairish has directed four documentaries and six feature films.

He made his debut in 1998 with the documentary The Train. His first feature-length movie Leaving by the Way won National Film Award for the best feature of 2001. It was included in the official competition program at the Karlovy Vary International Film Festival, and received an award for the best debut at the Raindance Film Festival in the United Kingdom.

His fourth documentary Pelican in the Desert was screened in competition at the Visions du Reel in Nyon, France, and received an honourable mention in the Documentary category of the Urania Awards at the Let's CEE Film Festival in Vienna, Austria.

Kairish worked on the Latvian-Finnish co-production Chronicles of Melanie, a historical drama, released in 2015.

He directed the film Janvāris, which received the Lielais Kristaps award for best feature film in 2023.

== List of works ==
=== Operas ===
- 2014 Valentina by Arturs Maskats (Latvian National Opera)
- 2014 Macbeth by Giuseppe Verdi (Staatstheater Darmstadt)
- 2014 Der Freischütz by Carl Maria von Weber (Oper Köln)
- 2013 A Midsummer Night's Dream by Benjamin Britten (Komische Oper Berlin)
- 2011 Götterdämmerung by Richard Wagner (Latvian National Opera)
- 2010 Il Trittico by Giacomo Puccini (Latvian National Opera)
- 2008 Siegfried by Richard Wagner (Latvian National Opera)
- 2007 Die Walküre by Richard Wagner (Latvian National Opera)
- 2001 Die Zauberflöte by Wolfgang Amadeus Mozart (Latvian National Opera)
- 1999 Eugene Onegin by Pyotr Tchaikovsky (Latvian National Opera)

=== Stage plays ===
- 2016 Peer Gynt by Henrik Ibsen and Edvard Grieg (Latvian National Theatre)
- 2015 Uguns un nakts by Rainis (Latvian National Theatre)
- 2010 Kasimir and Karoline by Ödön von Horváth (Latvian National Theatre)
- 2009 Pinocchio's Ashes by Jokum Rohde (Latvian National Theatre)
- 2008 Heldenplatz by Thomas Bernhard (Dailes Theatre)
- 2003 Die Dreigroschenoper by Bertolt Brecht (Latvian National Theatre)
- 2003 The Idiot by Dostoyevsky (New Riga Theatre)
- 2003 The Serpent by Mircea Eliade (New Riga Theatre)
- 2001 The Dark Deer by Inga Abele (New Riga Theatre)
- 2001 Margareta by Māra Zālīte (New Riga Theatre)
- 2000 Hotel Europa by Goran Stefanovsky (Wiener Festwochen)

=== Filmography ===
- 2026 Ulya (feature)
- 2022 January (feature)
- 2020 The Sign Painter (feature)
- 2015 Chronicles of Melanie (feature)
- 2014 Pelican in the Desert (documentary)
- 2009 Loengrins From Varka Kru (documentary)
- 2006 The Dark Deer (feature)
- 2004 Romeo And Juliet (documentary)
- 2004 The Monument (documentary)
- 2002 Leaving by the Way (feature)
- 2001 The Magic Flute (feature)
- 2000 The Wedding (feature)
- 1998 The Train (documentary)

== Awards ==
- The Latvian Great Music Award for the Best Opera Production for Eugene Onegin, 1999
- National Film Award for the Best Film of the Year for The Wedding, 2000
- The National Theatre Award for the Best Original Play for Margareta, 2001
- Spīdola Award for Unique Achievements in the Arts, 2001
- National Film Award for the best feature of the Year for Leaving by the Way, 2001
- The Best Debut at the Raindance Film Festival for Leaving by the Way, 2002
- FIPRESCI Award, Baltic section, best Baltic film for Leaving by the Way, 2002
- The Latvian Great Music Award for the Best European music project for Der Ring des Nibelungen (together with Stefan Herheim), 2014
- Special Jury Prize at the Let's Cee Film Festival for Pelican in the Desert, 2014
