= Melānija Vanaga =

Latvian writer and journalist

- Born: 4 September 1905; Kalna Sermuļi, Drabeši Parish, Russian Empire (now Latvia)
- Died: 23 September 1997 (aged 92); Carnikava, Latvia
- Occupations: Writer; Journalist
- Spouse: Aleksandrs Vanags
- Children: Alnis Vanags

Melānija Vanaga (née Šleija; September 4, 1905, in Drabeši Parish "Kalna Sermuļi" – September 23, 1997, in Carnikava) was a Latvian writer and journalist. She was deported to Siberia and is known for having documented her life in a series of diaries.

== Biography ==
Melānija Vanaga was born on September 4, 1905, at the homestead "Kalna Sermuļi" in Drabeši parish. She started studying at the Dole (now Amata) Primary School in the fall of 1912 and later studied at the Cēsis Gymnasium. She later commenced law studies at the University of Latvia. She worked at a court, and as a journalist in newspapers Brīvā Zeme and Daugavas Vēstnesis, as well as the Latvian Radio.

On 14 June 1941, Vanaga was deported to Siberia's Krasnoyarsk Oblast together with her eight-year-old son Alnis. Her husband, Aleksandrs, was separated from the family and sent to a Gulag camp in the Urals, where he was executed in 1942. She returned to Soviet-occupied Latvia in 1957. She worked as a herder in the kolhozs in the vicinity of Cēsis, where she started collecting local histories, stories, documents, and photos.

She was awarded the Order of the Three Stars and the Eduards Veidenbaums Prize in Literature in 1994 for her book Tēvu cilts (The Tribe of Fathers). In 2000, a memorial museum to Vanaga was opened at the Amata Primary School. Some of her writings have been published in English under the title "Suddenly, a Criminal: Sixteen Years in Siberia".

In 2016, director Viesturs Kairišs released the biopic film "The Chronicles of Melanie" based on her book "Suddenly, a Criminal".
