= Blizzard of Souls (film) =

2019 Latvian historical drama film

- International release poster
- Directed by: Dzintars Dreibergs
- Written by: Boris Frumin
- Produced by: Dzintars Dreibergs; Inga Praņevska
- Starring: Oto Brantevics; Mārtiņš Vilsons; Rēzija Kalniņa; Raimonds Celms; Gatis Gāga; Jēkabs Reinis; Renārs Zeltiņš; Ieva Florence; Vilis Daudziņš
- Cinematography: Valdis Celmiņš
- Edited by: Gatis Belogrudovs
- Music by: Lolita Ritmanis
- Release date: 8 November 2019
- Running time: 120 minutes (national version); 104 minutes (international version)
- Country: Latvia
- Languages: Latvian; Russian; German; Estonian; French

Blizzard of Souls (Latvian: Dvēseļu putenis), or The Rifleman (English title), is a 2019 Latvian historical drama film directed by Dzintars Dreibergs. It premiered on 8 November 2019 in Latvia and on 20 February 2020 internationally, at the European Film Market. The film is an adaptation of Aleksandrs Grīns' novel of the same name, written about his service as a rifleman in World War I. It was selected as the Latvian entry for the Best International Feature Film at the 93rd Academy Awards but didn't receive a nomination.

== Synopsis ==
After witnessing his mother being shot by the invading Imperial German Army, sixteen-year-old Artūrs, together with his father, decides to enlist in the national Latvian Riflemen battalions of the Imperial Russian Army in hopes of getting revenge and finding glory. Artūrs goes on to fight in World War I on the Eastern Front, where he loses his father and brother, and quickly becomes disillusioned. He joins the Bolsheviks, but when he is ordered to execute his friend, he realizes the Bolshevik's disregard for them and deserts, returning to his newly-proclaimed country to fight in the Latvian War of Independence and start everything from scratch.

== Cast ==
- Oto Brantevics as Artūrs Vanags
- Raimonds Celms as Edgars Vanags
- Mārtiņš Vilsons as Vanags
- Jēkabs Reinis as Miķelsons
- Gatis Gāga as Konrāds
- Renārs Zeltiņš as Spilva
- Vilis Daudziņš as Sala
- Grēta Trušiņa as Marta
- Ieva Florence as Mirdza
- Rēzija Kalniņa as Mother

== Production ==
Oto Brantevics, the actor for the lead role of Artūrs, was selected out of 1,300 candidates, despite Brantevics having no prior acting experience. Former Minister of Defence Raimonds Bergmanis made a cameo appearance in the film, while the then-Minister of Defence Artis Pabriks appeared as an extra. Several of the battle scenes were shot at the locations where the historical battles had taken place. Valdis Celmiņš drew inspiration for his cinematography from Christian Berger's concept of avoiding wide establishing shots by using a wide lens for medium shots and closeups, as well as László Nemes' film Son of Saul.

== Reception ==
=== Box office ===
During the first five weeks of screening the film was seen by more than 200,000 people, making it the most-watched film since the second restoration of Latvian independence in 1991.

=== Critical response ===
On review aggregator Rotten Tomatoes, the film holds an approval rating of 75% based on 16 reviews, with an average rating of 6.6/10. Metacritic assigned the film a weighted average score of 63 out of 100 based on 9 critics, indicating "generally favorable reviews". Ellen E Jones of The Guardian praised Brantevics' acting, yet concluded that "as a national coming-of-age story, The Rifleman never quite outgrows its innocent, uncritical patriotism". Deborah Young of The Hollywood Reporter also noted the film as being "underscored by evident, old-fashioned patriotism", but praised the "exceptionally atmospheric" cinematography by Celmiņš, "poignantly respectful" score by Ritmanis and editing by Belogrudovs, summarizing Blizzard of Souls as "[a] more realistic 1917".

The acting and cinematography was similarly praised by Rob Aldam of Backseat Mafia who believed the film "has the look and feel of a Hollywood blockbuster" and called it "one of the best war films of the last few years". Guy Lambert from The Upcoming described the cinematography as "utterly breathtaking" and "reminiscent of the brilliance of Band of Brothers" and called the acting "raw and exceptionally emotional", concluding "this film will no doubt be a hit."

=== Awards and nominations ===
Year	Award	Category	Result
2020	Kilogram of Culture	Event of the Year (Blizzard of Souls)	Won
2020	Tenerife International Film Music Festival Alex North Award	Best Soundtrack (Lolita Ritmanis)	Nominated
2020	IMAGO International Awards for Cinematography	Best Cinematography (Valdis Celmiņš)	Nominated
2020	Lielais Kristaps	Best Fiction Feature Film (Inga Praņevska and Dzintars Dreibergs)	Won
2020	Lielais Kristaps	Best Director (Dzintars Dreibergs)	Won
2020	Lielais Kristaps	Best Cinematography in a Feature Film (Valdis Celmiņš)	Won
2020	Lielais Kristaps	Best Make-Up (Dzintra Bijubena)	Won
2020	Lielais Kristaps	Best Score (Lolita Ritmanis)	Won
2020	Lielais Kristaps	Best Editing (Gatis Belogrudovs)	Won
2020	Lielais Kristaps	Best Acting (Oto Brantevics)	Nominated
2020	Lielais Kristaps	Best Screenplay (Boris Frumin, Dzintars Dreibergs)	Nominated
2020	Lielais Kristaps	Best Production Design (Juris Žukovskis)	Nominated
2020	Lielais Kristaps	Best Sound (Aleksandrs Vaicahovskis)	Nominated
2020	Shanghai International Film Festival	Audience Choice Award for Film (Dzintars Dreibergs)	Nominated
2020	Tallinn Black Nights Film Festival	Best Baltic Film (Dzintars Dreibergs)	Nominated
2020	World Soundtrack Awards	Public Choice Award (Lolita Ritmanis)	Nominated
2020	WorldFest-Houston International Film Festival Remi Award	Best Actor (Oto Brantevics)	Nominated
2020	WorldFest-Houston International Film Festival Remi Award	Best Supporting Actress (Ieva Florence)	Nominated
2021	Hollywood Music in Media Awards	Outstanding Score of Independent Foreign Language Film (Lolita Ritmanis)	Won
2021	Society of Composers & Lyricists Awards	Outstanding Original Score for Independent Film (Lolita Ritmanis)	Won

== See also ==
- Latvian Riflemen
- List of submissions to the 93rd Academy Awards for Best International Feature Film
- List of Latvian submissions for the Academy Award for Best International Feature Film
