= Skrastiņš =

Family name

Origin
- Origin: Latvian
- Meaning: "little coast"

Other names
- Variant form: Krastiņš

Skrastiņš (feminine: Skrastiņa) is a Latvian topographic surname, derived from the Latvian dialect word for "coast" (skrasts). Individuals with the surname include:

- Artūrs Skrastiņš (born 1974), Latvian actor
- Kārlis Skrastiņš (1974–2011), Latvian ice hockey player
- Keith Skrastiņš (born 1982), Canadian Photographer of Latvian descent

== See also ==
- Krastiņš
