= Jacob, Mimmi and the Talking Dogs =

2019 animated Latvian-Polish film

- Theatrical release poster
- Directed by: Edmunds Jansons
- Screenplay by: Līga Vidus
- Produced by: Jakub Karwowski; Sabine Andersone
- Production companies: Atom Art Studio; Letko Studio
- Release dates: July 20, 2019 (Giffoni Film Festival); September 21, 2019 (Kino Dzieci); October 1, 2019 (Latvia)
- Running time: 70 minutes
- Countries: Latvia; Poland
- Language: Latvian

Jacob, Mimmi and the Talking Dogs (Latvian: Jēkabs, Mimmi un runājošie suņi) is a 2019 Latvian-Polish animated adventure comedy film directed by Edmunds Jansons and based on the children's book Dog Town by Luīze Pastore. Funded by the National Film Centre of Latvia, Polish Film Institute and Creative Europe Media, the film is produced by Sabine Andersone for the Latvian Atom Art Studio and co-produced by Jakub Karwowski for the Polish Letko Studio. The film received several nominations, and won Best Animated Film at the 32nd International Film Festival for Children and Youth in Iran.

== Synopsis ==
The film follows Mimmi, who is sent to the suburbs to spend a summer with his uncle and cousin, Jacob, but they find out the local park is set to be transformed into new skyscrapers by a greedy businessman, and they decide to stop the development with the help of a pack of stray dogs that can talk.

== Cast ==
- Eduards Olekts as Jēkabs (Jacob)
- Nora Džumā as Mimmi
- Andris Keišs as Boss
- Kaspars Znotiņš as Tētis (Dad)
- Gatis Gāga as Ērglis (Eagle)
- Māra Liniņa as Mrs. Šmite (Mrs. Schmidt)
- Eduards Zilberts as Rausis (Manny Pie)

== Release ==
The film had its world premiere at the Giffoni Film Festival on 20 July 2019.

=== Accolades ===
Award	Date of ceremony	Category	Recipient(s)	Result	Ref.
International Film Festival for Children and Youth	28 August 2019	Best Animated Film	Jacob, Mimmi and the Talking Dogs	Won	
Lielais Kristaps	12 November 2019	Best Animated Feature	Jacob, Mimmi and the Talking Dogs	Nominated	
Lielais Kristaps	12 November 2019	Best Screenplay	Līga Vidus and Edmunds Jansons	Nominated	
Lielais Kristaps	12 November 2019	Best Animation Director	Edmunds Jansons	Nominated	
Lielais Kristaps	12 November 2019	Best Animation Artist	Elīna Brasliņa	Nominated	
Lielais Kristaps	12 November 2019	Best Composer	Krzysztof A. Janczak and Edgars Šubrovskis	Nominated	
