= Spēlmaņu nakts =

Latvian theatre awards

- Type: Theatre awards
- Awarded for: Achievements in professional theatre in Latvia
- Country: Latvia
- Presented by: Latvian Theatre Workers' Union
- Established: 1993
- First award: 3 June 1994
- Website: www.spelmanunakts.lv

Spēlmaņu nakts (also rendered in English as "Performers' Night") is Latvia's annual national awards ceremony for professional theatre. Established by the Latvian Theatre Workers' Union in 1993, it recognises productions and individual artistic work in Latvia's state, municipal, private and non-governmental professional theatres. The first ceremony, honouring achievements from 1993, took place on 3 June 1994. Since 1999, the ceremony has normally been held on 23 November, the birthday of Latvian actor and director Eduards Smiļģis.

The categories are revised between seasons and cover productions, directing, acting, stage and costume design, lighting and video, movement or choreography, music and other fields. Lifetime achievement, special and audience awards are also presented. The trophy is called the Skatuves nagla ("Stage Nail").

== History ==
The Latvian Theatre Workers' Union established the award in 1993. The first ceremony was held at the Riga Latvian Society House on 3 June 1994. Early editions evaluated work produced during a calendar year and were held near 2 June, a date associated with the beginning of professionally organised Latvian-language theatre in 1868. The ceremony received the name Spēlmaņu nakts in 1995.

At the end of the 1990s, the assessment period changed from the calendar year to the theatre season. Since 1999, the ceremony has normally taken place on 23 November in honour of Smiļģis. The 25th ceremony was held in 2018, when awards were presented in 16 categories and the event was broadcast on Latvian Television and Latvian Radio.

The usual ceremony was not held on 23 November 2013 because of the national mourning that followed the Zolitūde shopping centre roof collapse. The laureates instead received their awards at the Latvian Academy of Culture's Zirgu pasts theatre house on 16 December.

The award process was adapted during the COVID-19 pandemic in Latvia. In 2020, the ceremony was held partly in person, with its central event at Liepāja Theatre and nominees assembled at their respective theatres for a linked broadcast. For the disrupted 2020–2021 season, theatres were allowed to nominate up to four productions or other events, and twelve awards were presented without categories announced in advance. The jury also considered work beyond the theatres' own submissions.

== Selection and ceremony ==
The union appoints a new professional jury for each season. Its members are primarily theatre critics and scholars, sometimes joined by specialists from other fields. The jury follows new work from the beginning of the season in August until its conclusion in June, when the nominees are announced. Professional groups outside the established repertory theatres may also submit productions for consideration. The number of eligible productions increased from about 80 in 1993 to roughly 120–140 per season during the 2010s. More than 100 new productions were assessed in the 2021–2022 season, and 108 productions were evaluated for the 2025–2026 season, resulting in nominations in 17 categories.

The ceremony is produced as a theatrical event, with its director, producer and creative team changing between editions, and is broadcast by Latvian public media. A separate audience vote has been held since 2003, traditionally selecting a production, an actress and an actor. At the 2023 ceremony, awards were presented in 21 jury categories alongside the public vote.

== Awards and trophy ==
The awards are divided broadly between collective achievements, such as productions, and individual work. Production awards have included large-format, small-format, and children's or youth theatre. Individual categories have recognised directors, actors in leading and supporting roles, emerging artists, scenographers, costume designers, lighting and video artists, movement artists or choreographers, and composers. The jury may revise or merge categories to reflect changes in theatre practice. Lifetime achievement and various special awards sit outside the main seasonal categories.

Metal artist Juris Gagainis designed the trophy introduced in 1996. It depicts stage floorboards pierced by an upright nail, with a triangular mirror behind it. Originally named for the year in which it was presented, the trophy has been called the Skatuves nagla since 2002. Later trophies have been made by metal artist Arvīds Endziņš using Gagainis's design.

== Reception and related programmes ==
The award is a form of professional recognition within Latvian theatre, although jury choices and the extent to which an award affects audience attendance are recurring subjects of discussion.

An international review programme has brought foreign theatre specialists to Latvia to see nominated productions and discuss the season. In 2019, six visiting theatre professionals watched 13 productions and selected the New Riga Theatre production Vēstures izpētes komisija as their favourite. The 2024 edition included international critics' awards for a production and an individual performance. The 2025 ceremony was the 32nd edition and included professional jury awards, audience awards, a children and youth jury award, and international critics' recognition.
