= Latvian Academy of Culture =

Institution of higher education and scientific research

- Latvijas Kultūras akadēmija
- Established: December 29, 1990; 35 years ago
- Founders: Pēteris Laķis
- Rector: Rūta Muktupāvela
- Location: Ludzas iela 24, Riga, Latvia; 56.940540°N 24.142820°E
- Website: www.lka.edu.lv

The Latvian Academy of Culture (Latvian: Latvijas Kultūras akadēmija) is a higher education establishment in Latvia offering various bachelor's, magister and doctoral degree programmes on cultural subjects. The academy was founded in 1990 and is located in the Latgale Suburb of Riga.

== History ==
On 29 December 1990, the Latvian Cabinet of Ministers adopted the decision to create what would later be known as the Academy of Culture. The philosopher Pēteris Laķis was appointed rector and, in cooperation with the head of the Jāzeps Vītols Latvian Academy of Music, Jānis Siliņš, tasked with founding the new academy and form its study programmes. Studies began in the summer of 1991 with 25 students studying Cultural Theory, History and Administration, and five students studying Latvian and Danish, Latvian and Swedish, Latvian and Norwegian, Latvian and Polish, and Latvian and Lithuanian. The first bachelor's degree students were enrolled in 1995, and in 1997 the first magister degree students were matriculated. In 2003, the first doctoral thesis was defended at the academy.

== Rectors ==
- Pēteris Laķis – philosopher (1991–2003)
- Jānis Siliņš – theatre scientist (1990–2014)
- Rūta Muktupāvela – culture anthropologist (2014–present)

== Notable alumni ==
- Inga Alsiņa – actress
- Baiba Broka – actress
- Rasa Bugavičute-Pēce – playwright and author
- Lolita Čigāne – politician, former MP
- Agris Daņiļevičs – choreographer
- Inga Gaile – playwright and poet
- Iveta Grigule-Pēterse – politician, former MEP
- Jānis Joņevs – author
- Dace Melbārde – politician, current MEP
- Kristīne Nevarauska – actress
- Kārlis Vērdiņš – poet
- Kaspars Znotiņš – actor
