= Ulya (film) =

2026 Latvian biographical film

- International promotional poster
- Latvian: Uļa
- Directed by: Viestur Kairish
- Screenplay by: Viestur Kairish; Kārlis Arnolds Avots; Livia Ulman; Andris Feldmanis
- Produced by: Guntis Trekteris
- Starring: Kārlis Arnolds Avots; Chulpan Khamatova; Aleksas Kazanavičius; Shamil Khamatov
- Cinematography: Wojciech Staron
- Edited by: Armands Začs
- Music by: Ramo Teder; Marko Veisson
- Production companies: Ego Media; Allfilm; Tremora; Staron-Film
- Distributed by: Destiny Films
- Release dates: 21 May 2026 (Cannes); 16 September 2026 (Latvia)
- Running time: 102 minutes
- Countries: Latvia; Poland; Estonia; Lithuania
- Languages: Latvian; Russian

Ulya (Latvian: Uļa) is a 2026 biographical drama film directed by Viesturs Kairišs, co-written with Kārlis Arnolds Avots, Livia Ulman, and Andris Feldmanis. A co-production between Latvia, Poland, Estonia, and Lithuania, it stars Kārlis Arnolds Avots as Latvian basketball legend Uļjana Semjonova.

The film had its world premiere in the Un Certain Regard section of the 2026 Cannes Film Festival on 21 May 2026. It was selected as the Latvian entry for the Best International Feature Film at the 99th Academy Awards.

== Synopsis ==
Ulya (Uļa) is a very tall girl living on a remote Old Believer farm in the Daugavpils district of Soviet-occupied Latvia in 1964. Her height, almost two meters, worries her family, who aren't sure how she will fit into the world. When her class photo reaches basketball coaches, she is taken to Riga to train with TTT Riga. She works hard but feels torn, because basketball doesn't give her the ordinary life she dreams of. After running away back home, she realizes that both the village and the sport see her only as "the tall girl." When she finally accepts herself, she must decide whether to stay hidden or try to become the best basketball player in the world.

== Cast ==
- Kārlis Arnolds Avots as Uļjana Semjonova
- Chulpan Khamatova as mother Natalia (Natālija)
- Aleksas Kazanavičius as father Larions
- Shamil Khamatov as Pāvels
- Arturs Krūzkops as Kārlis Karbergs
- Kaspars Dumburs as Pauls Karpovičs
- Alise Dzene as Maija
- Madara Viļčuka as Ilze

== Release ==
Ulya had its world premiere at the 2026 Cannes Film Festival at the Un Certain Regard section.

The film also competed in International Competition at the Jerusalem Film Festival in July 2026.

The film was screened in Free Spirit section at the Warsaw International Film Festival on 9 October 2026, and competed at the 21st Rome Film Festival in 'Progressive Cinema Competition - Visions for the World of Tomorrow' in October 2026.

It will open Tallinn Black Nights Film Festival on 6 November 2026, and screened as part of 'Visions of the East' at the Arras Film Festival in the first fortnight of November 2026.

It is scheduled to release in French theatres on 18 November 2026 by Destiny Films.

Paris-based sales agency B-Rated International acquired the sales rights of the film in April 2026.

== Reception ==
The film has generally received positive reviews. Reviewers have praised the film's "visual language", Wojciech Staroń's "black-and-white cinematography", "Kārlis Arnolds Avots' performance", and the "original approach" to the story of Latvian legend Uļjana Semjonova.

Writing for Cineuropa, Davide Abbatescianni at 2026 Cannes Film Festival, praised Ulya for its restrained atmosphere and visual control, highlighting the muted interiors, measured performances and carefully composed mise-en-scène. He observed that Viesturs Kairišs creates a world suspended between oppression and introspection, while maintaining a confident tone that avoids overt melodrama. Abbatescianni nevertheless noted that the film does not entirely overcome the tension arising from its central creative decision, particularly its casting choice. Overall, he regarded the film as a "thoughtful and technically accomplished work" that brings renewed attention to a life deserving of remembrance.

== Accolades ==
Award / Festival	Date of ceremony	Category	Recipient(s)	Result	Ref.
Cannes Film Festival	22 May 2026	Un Certain Regard Award	Ulya	Nominated	
Jerusalem Film Festival	16 July 2026	Best Performance Award	Kārlis Arnolds Avots	Won	

== See also ==
- List of submissions to the 99th Academy Awards for Best International Feature Film
- List of Latvian submissions for the Academy Award for Best International Feature Film
