= Kaspars Znotiņš =

Latvian actor

- Born: Kaspars Znotiņš; 7 October 1975 (age 49); Jelgava, Latvia
- Occupation: Actor

Kaspars Znotiņš (born 7 October 1975) is a Latvian stage and film actor.

Born in Jelgava, Latvia, Znotiņš began his career working on the New Riga Theatre, and has performed in stage productions at the Latvian National Theatre and Daile Theatre. Znotiņš has also appeared in a number of Latvian films, such as the 2010 Gatis Šmits-directed comedy-drama Return of Sergeant Lapins. In 2010, he won the Season Award (Latvian: Spēlmaņu nakts), an annual award bestowed upon to the best Latvian dramatic stage actor by the Latvian Theatre Union (LTDS) for his role in Ziedonis un visums (Ziedonis and the Universe). In 2017, he won the Lielais Kristaps Award for Best Actor for his role as Francis in the Aik Karapetian directed crime-drama film Pirmdzimtais (English: Forstborn).

Znotiņš is married and the father of four children – Emīls, Rūta, Krišs and Zīle.

== Filmography ==
Year	Film	Role	Release date (flag: country specific)
1997	The Mills of Fate	episode	1997
2000	The Mystery of the Old Parish House		2000
2003	Likteņa līdumnieki (TV series)	Edgars Nārbulis	2003
2007	Midsummer Madness	Border guard	2007
2007	Bitter Wine	Donats	2007
2009	Medības		11 September 2009
2010	Return of Sergeant Lapins	Dainis Geidmanis	26 November 2010
2015	Shrines (Short film)		2015
2017	Firstborn	Francis	2017 (Lielais Kristaps Award, Best Actor)
2017	Virus	Luiss	2017
2017	Bize un Neguļa (Animated film)	Voice	2017
2017	Adreses (TV series)	Himself	2017
2018	Homo Novus	Kurcums	2018
2018	Parīzes dziesma	Anatolijs Lunačarskis	2018
2018	Still River	Louis	5 November 2018
2018	Saule brauca debesīs		16 November 2018
2018	24h saullēkts	Aleksis	2018
2019	Jekabs, Mimmi un runajosie suni	Tetis	1 February 2019
2020	O2	Ivan Kostrov	9 October 2020
