= Vilis Daudziņš =

Latvian actor

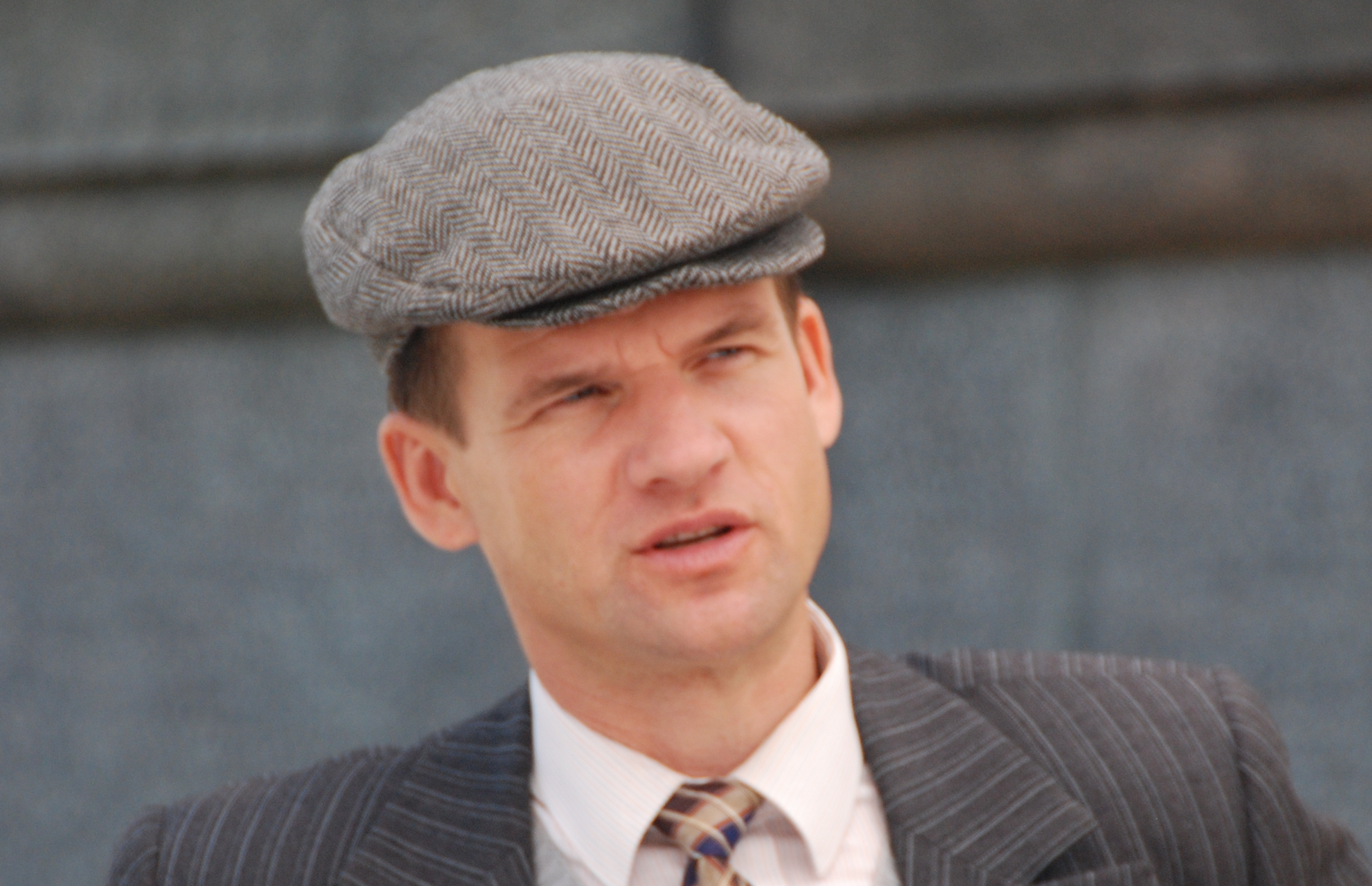
- Daudziņš during the filming of Dream Team 1935 by the Government of Latvia
- Born: Vilis Daudziņš; 7 November 1970 (age 55); Rīga, Latvian SSR
- Occupation: Actor

Vilis Daudziņš (born 7 November 1970) is a Latvian actor. In the theatre, he has appeared in several plays of Alvis Hermanis and Māra Ķimele, produced in New Riga Theatre. He has also taken part in several films.

== Filmography ==
Year	Film	Role	Release date (flag: country specific)	Notes
2007	Neprāta cena	Armands	2007	TV series (165 episodes)
2007	Monotony		2007	
2007	Defenders of Riga	Paulis	11 November 2007	
2009	The Courageous Heart of Irena Sendler	Gestapo Officer	19 April 2009	
2010	Return of Sergeant Lapins	Ervīns Meijers	26 November 2010	
2012	Dream Team 1935	Rihards Dekšenieks	19 November 2012	
2014	Modris		24 October 2014	
2014	Segvārds Vientulis		4 November 2014	
2015	Dawn			
2017	Foam at the Mouth	Didzis	10 November 2017	Lielais Kristaps Award, Best Actor
2018	Bille			
2018	Homo Novus	Bicens		
2019	Blizzard of Souls	Sala	8 November 2019	
