= Kolka Cool =

2011 Latvian film directed by Juris Poškus

- Poster
- Directed by: Juris Poškus
- Starring: Iveta Pole; Artuss Kaimiņš; Andris Keišs; Aigars Apinis, Guna Zariņa
- Cinematography: Aadel Nodeh-Farahani
- Distributed by: Mountain River Films
- Release date: December 16, 2011
- Running time: 97 minutes
- Country: Latvia
- Language: Latvian

Kolka Cool is a 2011 Latvian comedy-drama film directed by Juris Poškus, starring Iveta Pole, Artuss Kaimiņš, Andris Keišs, Aigars Apinis, Guna Zariņa, Māra Ķimele.

The film was awarded the Latvian National Film Prize Lielais Kristaps for Best Actress (Iveta Pole), Best Supporting Actor (Aigars Apinis), and Best Editing, as well as being nominated in seven more categories.

== Plot ==
The film depicts the mentality of the inhabitants of a small village on the Baltic Sea coast (ostensibly, the real-life village of Kolka). Three guys are trying to fulfill their lives by drinking beer, killing time and picking fights with neighboring villagers. The main character, Andža, is trying to convince his girlfriend to marry him. The sudden arrival of his elder brother Gvido, a sailor, starts a series of events where elevated self-esteem, pride and cravings for love that is stronger than death emerge as the dominant themes.
