= Regīna Razuma =

Latvian actress (1951–2023)

- Born: Regīna Vesere; 22 September 1951; Riga, Latvian SSR, USSR (now Riga, Latvia)
- Died: 14 May 2023 (aged 71)
- Occupations: Actress; Ballet dancer

Regīna Razuma (born Regīna Vesere; 22 September 1951 – 14 May 2023) was a Latvian actress and ballerina.

== Biography ==
Razuma was born into a large family in Riga on 22 September 1951. In 1968, she graduated from the Riga Choreographic School.

From 1968 to 1974, Razuma was a ballerina of the Daile State Song and Dance Ensemble. In 1971, she began acting in films. She retired as a ballerina in 1975. From 1975 to 1978 she studied at the People's Film Actor Studio at the Riga Film Studio. In 1982, she graduated from the acting department of the theater department of the Jāzeps Vītols Latvian Academy of Music. From 1980 to 1992 she was an actress at the Dailes Theatre. From 1992 to 2023, she was an actress at the New Riga Theatre.

Razuma was a model for artist Maija Tabaka, the most famous work is "Portrait of Regina Razuma".

In 2022 Razuma starred in the film The Good Neighbor as Mrs Petrova. She died on 14 May 2023, at the age of 71.
