= Gundars Āboliņš =

Latvian actor

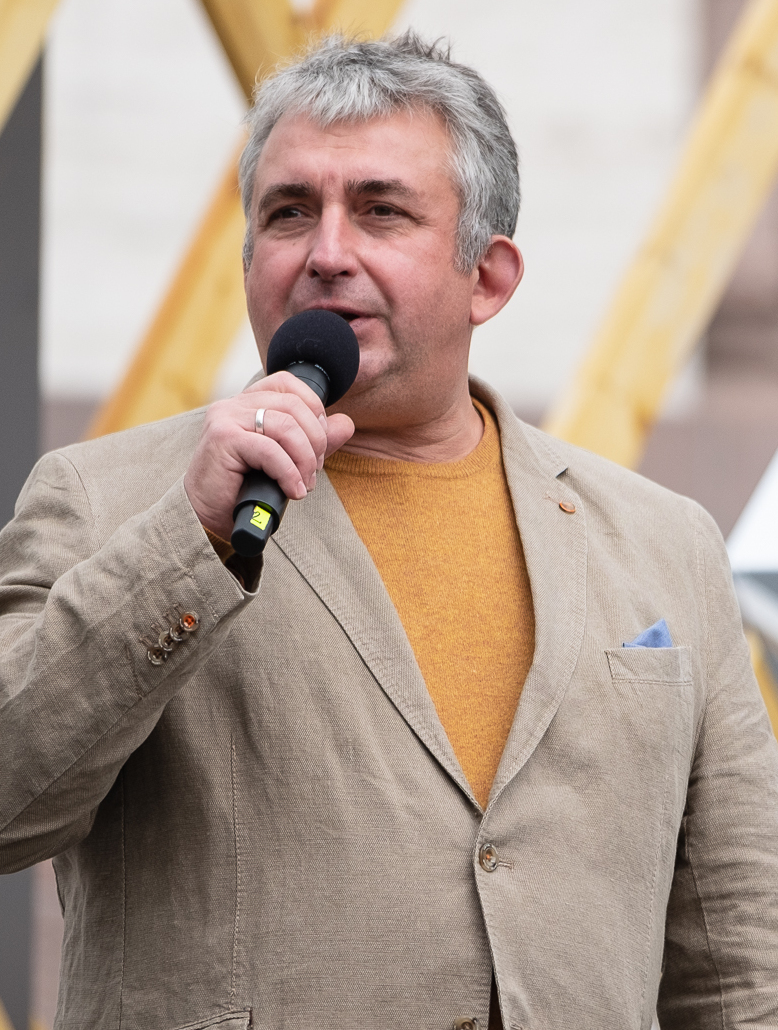
- Born: 7 January 1960 (age 65); Riga, Latvian Soviet Socialist Republic
- Occupation: Actor

Gundars Āboliņš (born 7 January 1960 in Riga) is a Latvian actor. He worked for the New Riga Theatre in Riga, having formerly worked for the Dailes Theatre. He was awarded the Spēlmaņu nakts gada aktieris award (best actor) in 2006.

Gundars Āboliņš parents were actors Vera Singajevska and Tālivaldis Āboliņš. He studied in Theatre department of Latvian State Conservatory (1978-82). Later he started to work as an actor ir Theater of the youth. In early 1990s he moved to Dailes theater where he worked for almost a decade. In 2000 Alvis Hermanis invited him to work in New Riga theater. He left in 2015 to join German theatre Munich Kammerspiele. In 2018 Āboliņš returned to New Riga theater.

== Filmography ==
Year	Film	Role
1977	Buras	Stass
1981	A Limousine the Colour of Midsummer's Eve	Uģis Tūters
1982	Aizmirstās lietas	episodic
1986	Apbraucamais ceļš	episodic
1987	Fotogrāfija ar sievieti un mežakuili	episodic
1989	Dzīvīte	Ojārs Rubenis
1993	Grēciniece maskā	
2000	The Mystery of the Old Parish House	Žoržiks
2004	Waterbomb for the Fat Tomcat	Ivo
2006	Ūdens	
2007	Midsummer Madness	Oskars
2009	Little Robbers	Guard
2011	Monsieur Taurins	Gunārs Tauriņš
2018	Bille	Shop owner Bānītis
2018	Homo Novus	Kviesis
2020	The Sign Painter	Bernšteins
