= New Riga Theatre =

Theatre in Riga, Latvia

Coordinates: 56.9546°N 24.1250°E

The New Riga Theater
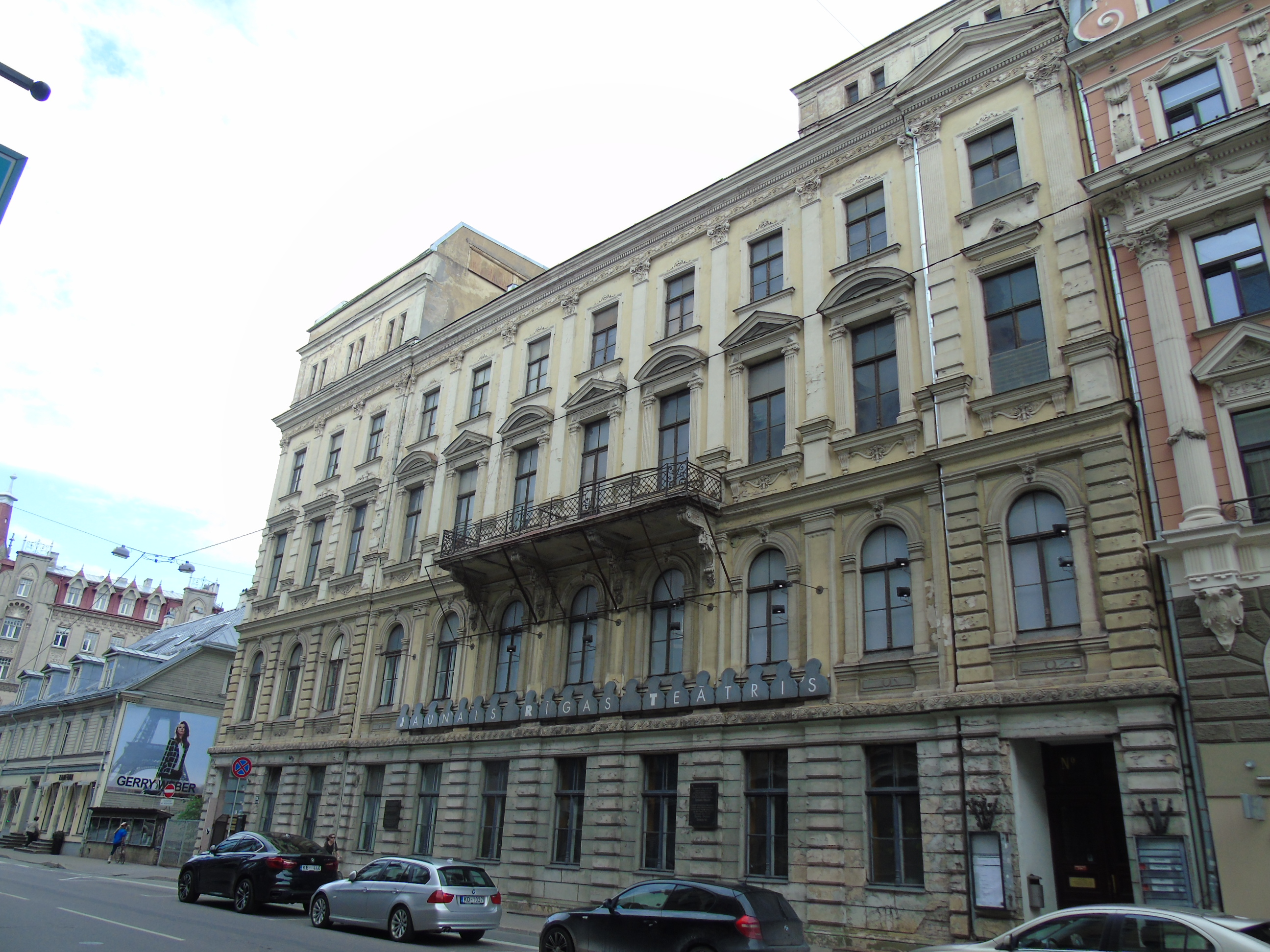
- Historical building of the theatre. (Renovated in 2024)
- Address: Lāčplēša iela 25; Riga; Latvia
- Owner: City of Riga
- Capacity: 488 (Large Hall); 85 (Small Hall)
- Current use: State repertory theater

Construction
- Opened: 1992

Website
- www.jrt.lv/en

New Riga Theatre (Latvian: Jaunais Rīgas teātris) is a theatre in Riga, Latvia. It was established in 1992. Several world renowned Latvian directors have started their careers here like, among others, Alvis Hermanis and Viesturs Kairišs. Since 1997, Alvis Hermanis serves as the Main Stage Director.

The theatre building, which had previously hosted theaters since 1902, was renovated and considerably expanded from 2017 to 2024, doubling its indoor area. During the construction works, the theater was relocated to the renovated Riga Tobacco Factory cultural space at Miera iela 58a.

== Directors/actors/freelance actors ==
Directors:
- Alvis Hermanis
- Māra Ķimele

Actors:

- Andris Keišs
- Baiba Broka
- Elita Kļaviņa
- Ģirts Krūmiņš
- Guna Zariņa
- Gundars Āboliņš
- Inga Alsiņa-Lasmane
- Inga Tropa
- Ivars Krasts
- Jana Čivžele
- Jevgenijs Isajevs
- Kaspars Znotiņš
- Kristīne Krūze
- Regīna Razuma
- Sandra Kļaviņa
- Toms Veličko
- Vilis Daudziņš

Freelance actor:

- Andis Strods
- Anta Krūmiņa
- Āris Matesovičs
- Edgars Samītis
- Gatis Gāga
- Iveta Pole
- Liena Šmukste
- Reinis Boters
- Varis Piņķis

== Repertory ==
- THE GOAT or WHO IS SILVIA?
- ASPASIA. PERSONALLY
- BRODSKY/BARYSHNIKOV
- THE LAKE OF HOPES
- CYNICS
- THE TIPSY GOD
- THE TWELVE CHAIRS
- POETRY
- DUKŠI
- OSIERS
- PHILOMEL COTTAGE
- LATVIAN LOVE
- BLACK MILK
- NORA
- OBLOMOV
- THE LATVIAN ROBBERS
- TRAVELLERS BY SEA AND LAND
- SUBMISSION
- LENIN'S LAST CHRISTMAS PARTY
- THE TRIAL
- AUTUMN SONATA
- TEACHER JAAP AND THE CLASS
- SONJA
- GRANDFATHER
- ZIEDONIS AND THE UNIVERSE
