= Vita Vārpiņa =

Latvian actress (born 1968)

Vita Vārpiņa (born 8 February 1968, in Riga) is a Latvian actress. She was awarded Best Actress in the Latvian National Film Awards, Lielais Kristaps, in 2014 for her role in Mother, I Love You.
