= The Sign Painter =

2020 Latvian war drama

- Theatrical release poster
- Directed by: Viestur Kairish
- Written by: Viestur Kairish (based on a novel by Gunārs Janovskis)
- Produced by: Guntis Trekteris; Julietta Sichel; Kęstutis Drazdauskas; Peter Ragauss
- Starring: Dāvis Suharevskis; Gundars Āboliņš; Agnese Cīrule; Juozas Budraitis; Brigita Cmuntova
- Cinematography: Gints Bērziņš
- Edited by: Armands Začs
- Music by: Juste Janulytė
- Distributed by: EastWest Distribution
- Release date: 15 January 2020
- Running time: 118 minutes
- Countries: Latvia; Czech Republic; Lithuania
- Languages: Latgalian; Latvian; German; Russian; Yiddish
- Budget: EUR 1.5 million

The Sign Painter (Latgalian: Piļsāta pi upis, Latvian: Pilsēta pie upes – 'city by the river') is a 2020 historical drama film written and directed by Latvian filmmaker Viesturs Kairišs. The film premiered on 15 January 2020 in Latvia and on 19 November 2020 internationally at the Tallinn Black Nights Film Festival.

== Plot ==
The Sign Painter is a tragical comedy about a young Latgalian man, Ansis, with the dream to marry Zisele, the daughter of a local Jewish merchant, and to pursue a career as an artist whilst supporting himself as a sign painter through the Ulmanis' Authoritarian Regime (after the 1934 coup) and the subsequent Soviet, German and Soviet occupations of Latvia during World War II.
