= Modris =

Latvian male given name

- Gender: Male

Origin
- Meaning: vigilant
- Region of origin: Latvia

Modris is a Latvian masculine given name, borne by more than 2,500 men in Latvia.

The name means "watchful" or "vigilant". Its nameday is celebrated on 21 September. It is one of the relatively few surviving Latvian names of indigenous origin from among the great number revived or introduced during the Latvian National Awakening of the late 19th, and early 20th centuries.

== Individuals ==
Modris may refer to:

- Modris Eksteins (born 1943), Latvian-Canadian historian
- Modris Liepiņš (born 1966), Latvian race walker
- Modris Tenisons (born 1945), Latvian mime
