= Return of Sergeant Lapiņš =

2010 Latvian film directed by Gatis Šmits

- Directed by: Gatis Šmits
- Written by: Jānis Nords; Gatis Šmits
- Produced by: Alise Ģelze; Gatis Šmits
- Starring: Andris Keišs; Guna Zariņa; Baiba Broka
- Cinematography: Soopum Sohn
- Edited by: Oskars Morozs
- Music by: Kārlis Lācis
- Production companies: TANKA; Solid Entertainment
- Distributed by: TANKA
- Release dates: 11 October 2010 (PIFF); 26 November 2010 (Latvia)
- Running time: 80 minutes
- Countries: Latvia; Sweden
- Language: Latvian
- Budget: LVL 426,000

Return of Sergeant Lapiņš (Latvian: Seržanta Lapiņa atgriešanās or initially Tas notika ar viņiem) is a 2010 comedy-drama film directed by Latvian director Gatis Šmits.

The film's plot is based on the play Tas notika ar viņiem (That Happened to Them) written by Gatis Šmits and produced in The New Riga Theatre in 2007.

Before being released on 26 November, the film was screened at the 15th Busan International Film Festival, which took place in October 2010.

== Plot ==
The film is set in Riga, where Latvian National Armed Forces Sergeant Krists Lapiņš returns from an international military mission abroad and moves into a remote flat in the city's Āgenskalns district. However, although expecting to live a peaceful and quiet life, Krists finds himself involved in several adventures.

== Cast ==
- Andris Keišs as Sgt. Krists Lapiņš
- Guna Zariņa as Alise Lagzdiņa
- Gatis Gāga as Didzis Budļevskis
- Vilis Daudziņš as Ervīns Meijers
- Kaspars Znotiņš as Dainis Geidmanis
- Baiba Broka as Maira Mežsarga
- Linda Šingireja as Ināra Meijere
- Igors Ziemelis as Mazais
