= The Chronicles of Melanie =

2016 Latvian biographic drama film

- Directed by: Viesturs Kairišs
- Produced by: Inese Boka-Grūbe; Gints Grūbe
- Starring: Sabine Timoteo
- Cinematography: Gints Bērziņš
- Edited by: Jussi Rautaniemi
- Music by: Arturs Maskats; Kārlis Auzāns; Aleksandrs Vaicahovskis
- Release dates: 1 November 2016 (Latvia); 21 November 2016 (International)
- Running time: 120 minutes
- Country: Latvia
- Languages: Latvian; Russian
- Budget: €705,000
- Box office: $5,227

The Chronicles of Melanie (Latvian: Melānijas hronika) is a 2016 Latvian biographical drama film directed by Viesturs Kairišs, starring Sabine Timoteo. The film is based on the real life of Melānija Vanaga. It was produced by Latvia's Mistrus Media and co-produced by the Czech Republic's 8Heads Productions and Finland's Inland Film Company.

Two weeks after its domestic release on November 1 the film was watched by 35,000 people, making it the most-watched Latvian film of 2016.

== Plot ==
After the Soviet occupation of Latvia in 1940 Melānija and her son are sent from their home in Latvia to a Gulag labor camp in Tyukhtet, Siberia as "socially dangerous criminals" as part of the June deportation in 1941. For the next 16 years, she retains her will to live by writing letters to her husband Aleksandrs, whose fate she knows nothing about.

== Cast ==
- Sabine Timoteo as Melānija Vanaga
- Edvīns Mekšs as Andrejs Vanags
- Ivars Krasts as Aleksandrs Vanags
- Guna Zariņa as Katrīna
- Maija Doveika as Vilma
- Viktors Nemecs as Ampalov
- Erwin Leder as Jakob
- Evija Rudzīte as Biruta
- Baiba Broka as Anna
- Kirill Zaytsev as Lieutenant of the People's Commissariat of Internal Affairs
- Astrīda Kairiša as Melānija's mother
- Lilita Ozoliņa as deported woman
- Ģirts Krūmiņš as Katrīna's husband Kārlis
- Evija Martinsone as opera soloist

== Production ==
Filming took place in Latvia (Riga, Biksti, Pasiene, Rēzekne) and in Karelia, Russia, where the Siberian scenes were shot.

== Awards ==
The Chronicles of Melanie received the award for best cinematography at the 2016 Tallinn Black Nights Film Festival. In 2017, at the Chicago Film Festival Blowup the film received the special Andrei Tarkovsky Award for best direction. It was selected as the Latvian entry for the Best Foreign Language Film at the 90th Academy Awards, but it was not nominated.

At the 2017 Latvian film festival Lielais Kristaps, The Chronicles of Melanie won the award as the Best feature film, and also picked the Best Director, Best Actress, Best Design and Best Costume Design received.

== Reception ==
Wendy Ide of Screen Daily described the film as "a potent account of the human cost of Soviet ethnic cleansing in the Baltic region". She compared it to the 2014 Estonian film In the Crosswind, which also is about a woman subjected to the June deportation, and wrote that The Chronicles of Melanie is "less experimental in approach". Ide wrote: "The distorted sound creates a sense of delirium; the painfully slow movements of the malnourished women gives the film a nightmarish quality. Time slows down, both for the exiled Latvian women and also, at times, for the audience. It all amounts to a challenging viewing experience."

== See also ==
- Population transfer in the Soviet Union
- List of submissions to the 90th Academy Awards for Best Foreign Language Film
- List of Latvian submissions for the Academy Award for Best Foreign Language Film
