= Guna Zariņa =

Latvian actress (born 1972)

- Born: Guna Zariņa; 1 October 1972 (age 52); Rīga, Latvia

Guna Zariņa (born 1 October 1972) is a Latvian actress. In the theater, she has appeared in several plays of Alvis Hermanis and Māra Ķimele. She has also appeared in several films.

In 2007 she received the Union of Latvian Theatre Workers Best Actress award, in 2015 she was awarded the Lielais Kristaps and in 2017 she was awarded the Order of Three Stars.

== Selected filmography ==
Year	Film	Role	Release date
1998	Seko man	Anna	1998
1999	Kāzas	Lelde	1999
2000	Pa ceļam aizejot	Ruta	2000
2006	Ūdens	Marija	2006
2007	Uguns	Marija	2007
2008	Akmeņi		2008
2009	Medības	Renāte	11 September 2009
2010	Return of Sergeant Lapins	Alise Lagzdiņa	26 November 2010
2011	Kolka Cool	Gunta	
2016	The Chronicles of Melanie	Katrīna	1 November 2016
2017	Out	Gaida	
2021	Emily. Queen of the Latvian Press	Emīlija Benjamiņa	20 September 2021
