= Roze Stiebra =

Latvian animator (1942–2024)

- Born: Rozālija Stiebra; 17 March 1942; Riga, Reichskommissariat Ostland
- Died: 22 December 2024 (aged 82); Riga, Latvia
- Occupations: Animator; screenwriter; film director
- Years active: 1969–2024
- Awards: Order of the Three Stars

Roze Stiebra (born Rozālija Stiebra; 17 March 1942 – 22 December 2024) was a Latvian animator.

== Life and career ==
Roze Stiebra was born on 17 March 1942 in Riga. She graduated from the Faculty of Puppetry at the Saint Petersburg State Theatre Arts Academy in 1964, and went on to work as an animator for Latvian Television (studio Telefilm-Riga 1966–1987), Riga Film Studio (1987–1990) and the animation studio Dauka (since 1991).

She has received the Lielais Kristaps award for "best animated film" six times, for her films Kā es braucu Ziemeļmeitas lūkoties (1980), Kabata (1983), Skatāmpanti (1988), Ness un Nesija (1993), Pasaciņas. Miega vilcieniņš (1998), and The Unusual Rigans (2001).

She was a member of the International Animated Film Association. In 1995, she was honored with the Spīdolas Award, the highest award of the Latvian Culture Foundation. In 2005, Stiebra received the Order of the Three Stars.

Stiebra died on 22 December 2024, at the age of 82.
