= Artūrs Skrastiņš =

Latvian actor

- Born: Artūrs Skrastiņš; 18 September 1974 (age 51); Jelgava, Latvia
- Occupation: Actor

Artūrs Skrastiņš (born 18 September 1974) is a Latvian stage and film actor. He has been a long-standing member of the Dailes Theatre in Riga and is known for his performances in numerous theatrical productions as well as in several prominent Latvian feature films. Skrastiņš has received national recognition for his work and is regarded as one of the most prominent contemporary actors in Latvia. In 1998, he received the Latvian National Film Prize Lielais Kristaps for his role in The Mills of Fate (Likteņdzirnas), and in 2015, he was awarded the Order of the Three Stars.

== Life and career ==
=== Early life ===
Artūrs Skrastiņš was born on 18 September 1974 (in Jelgava) and lived in Aizpute until the age of six. Both of his parents, Jānis Skrastiņš and Rasma Atvare, were medical doctors, and Artūrs was the only child in the family. His parents were never married and lived in a hospital-provided apartment. His father, Jānis, has been described as a man of extremes, intellectually curious but also struggling with alcoholism. As a result, tensions developed within the family, and at the age of six, Artūrs moved with his mother to Jelgava. There, his mother later met another man named Jānis, who became Artūrs’s stepfather. At the time Skrastiņš was characterised as a stubborn and unruly child.

He attended Jelgava Secondary School No. 1 (later Jelgava Gymnasium). While in the first grade, encouraged by his friend and classmate Andris Keišs, he began attending a theatre group at the Jelgava Culture House led by Lūcija Ņefedova together with Inta Alekse. His interest in theatre deepened after attending a production of Sprīdītis directed by Inta Alekse with his mother; six years later, he himself performed in the same production. Although he developed a strong interest in theatre he did not yet intend to pursue acting professionally.

His mother died following surgery at the age of 46 (1988), when Artūrs was in the eighth grade. Recalling her, he stated that “mother was kind, but very strict.” Contemporaries have noted that Artūrs changed significantly after her death.

As actors were admitted to the Latvian Academy of Culture every other year, Skrastiņš took a gap year after graduating from secondary school and travelled across Europe with friends, with very little money. In 1993, he later enrolled in the acting programme at the Latvian Academy of Culture. His classmate Andris Keišs described their cohort as strong, though the regime was extremely demanding: classes began at 8:30 a.m. with Ansis Rūtentāls and concluded at 10 p.m. with the creation of etudes.

While still in his second year of studies, Skrastiņš appeared on the stage of the Dailes Theatre in Arnolda Liniņa’s production Sirds.

His first major role was as Dmitri Karamazov in a stage adaptation of Fyodor Dostoevsky’s The Brothers Karamazov, directed by Pēteris Krilovs. Krilovs noted that Skrastiņš possessed the ability to think vividly, actively, and emotionally. The production lasted seven hours, including intermissions, and was staged during the actors’ fourth year of study. The performance received high critical acclaim at the Homo Novus theatre festival. In 1996, Skrastiņš graduated from the Latvian Academy of Culture with a qualification as a theatre and film actor.

=== Acting career ===
After graduating from the Latvian Academy of Culture, Skrastiņš began working at the Dailes Theatre (1996). Even before completing his studies, he was already regarded as part of the theatre’s ensemble. Ilze Vītoliņa has stated that the Dailes Theatre is particularly suited to Skrastiņš, noting that he is capable of commanding the large stage—an ability possessed by few actors.

His first role at the Dailes Theatre may be considered that of the Younger Brother in the musical Meža gulbji by Māra Zālīte and Raimonds Pauls, directed by Arnis Ozoliņš and based on the fairy tale by Hans Christian Andersen. In Meža gulbji, Skrastiņš performed songs accompanied by Raimonds Pauls, moving both audiences and critics. Baiba Broka and Indra Laure have noted the energetic impact of his singing. Another significant musical in his career was Šveiks (1998) and its sequel Šveika jaunās dēkas, in which he portrayed the title role.

After six years at the theatre, Skrastiņš experienced professional exhaustion and enrolled in the Medical Academy; however, he did not ultimately commence his studies there.

At the Latvian Song Festival (2001) “Rīgai - 800” Artūrs sang the Aleksandrs Čaks song “Miglā asaro logs”, he recalls it as an unforgettable experience.

== Selected Filmography ==
Year	Film	Role	Release date (flag: country specific)	Notes
1997	The Mills of Fate	Beisiks	1997	
2000	Kings		2000	
2000	The Mystery of the Old Parish House		2000	
2000	Dangerous Summer	Roberts	2000	
2004	Waterbomb for the Fat Tomcat	Father	4 March 2004	
2007	Defenders of Riga	Jēkabs	11 November 2007	
2009	Little Robbers	Bank guard	27 March 2009	
2009	Rudolf's Gold	Kārlis	15 January 2010	
2012	Wallander	Colonel Jāzeps Pūtnis	July 2012	
2012	Betrayal	Second Husband	September 2012	
2017	Magic Kimono	Roberts	2017	
2018	The Pagan King	Pope	17 January 2018	
2018	The Mover	Žanis Lipke	25 October 2018	
2018	Bille	Žanis, Father of Bille	20 April 2018	
2019	TUR (film)	Ēriks	16 August 2019	
2020	Cojs	Majors Cīrulis	2020	
2021	Emily. Queen of the Latvian Press	Eižens Finks	20 September 2021	
2022	January (film)		11 November 2022	
2024	Marija's Silence	Jēkabs Peterss	18 February 2024	
2025	Escape Net	Pauls Strazds	6 November 2025	

== Personal life ==
Skrastiņš has expressed a desire to keep his personal life private as he fears that the viewer coming to the theatre knows everything about him.

At the age of 19, he married choreographer Alda Rumpīte; however, the marriage later ended in divorce.

Skrastiņš dated actor and director Rēzija Kalniņa for multiple years before splitting up in 2004.

At the Dailes Theatre, Skrastiņš met Ilze Ķuzule, daughter of Māra Zālīte; the two later married (2008), and she is now known as Ilze Ķuzule-Skrastiņa. The couple has twins, Emīlija and Marats.

== Awards ==
In 2012, Artūrs Skrastiņš received the Harijs Liepiņš Award for outstanding contribution to theatre, presented by the Latvian Theatre Workers’ Union. He has been nominated 18 times for, Latvia's premier annual theater award, the “Spēlmaņu nakts” (Players’ Night) and has won the prize seven times.

In 1998, his portrayal of Bebsiks in the film Likteņdzirnas (The Mills of Fate) was critically acclaimed. For this role, he received the Lielais Kristaps award, as well as prizes at the international film festival Baltijas Pērle and the Minsk film festival Lapkritis.

He has twice received the audience-voted award “Metaxa Theatre Star”. In 2019, he was awarded the Žanis Katlaps Prize.

Skrastiņš has also been awarded the fourth class of the Order of the Three Stars.
