= Ruch and Norie =

2015 film

- Film poster
- Directed by: Ināra Kolmane
- Written by: Ināra Kolmane
- Produced by: Jānis Juhņēvičs; Ināra Kolmane; Marta Mannenbach
- Starring: Marija Steimane; Norie Tsuruta
- Cinematography: Andrejs Verhoustinskis
- Edited by: Līga Pipare
- Music by: Mārtiņš Miļevskis; Rihards Kolmanis; Uģis Prauliņš
- Release date: 30 April 2015
- Running time: 66 minutes
- Country: Latvia
- Languages: Latvian, Japanese

Ruch and Norie (Latvian: Ručs un Norie) is a 2015 Latvian documentary film directed by Ināra Kolmane. The film premiered on 30 April 2015. It received four Lielais Kristaps film awards, including Best Documentary, Best Director of a Documentary and Best Screenplay.

== Synopsis ==
Norie Tsuruta, a Japanese anthropology student, travels to Latvia to write her Master's thesis about the Suiti community. There she meets one of the oldest Suiti women Marija Steimane nicknamed Ruch with whom Norie forms a very strong bond that does not fade even when Norie returns to Japan.

== Awards and nominations ==
Year	Award	Category	Result
2015	Lielais Kristaps	Best Documentary	Won
2015	Lielais Kristaps	Best Screenplay (Ināra Kolmane)	Won
2015	Lielais Kristaps	Best Director of a Documentary (Ināra Kolmane)	Won
2015	Lielais Kristaps	Best Cinematography of a Documentary (Andrejs Verhoustinskis)	Won
2015	Lielais Kristaps	Best Editing (Ilvars Veģis, Jānis Juhņēvičs)	Nominated
2015	Lielais Kristaps	Best Sound Editing (Līga Pipare)	Nominated
