= Jānis Kalējs =

Latvian film director (born 1965)

Jānis Kalējs (born 1965 in Riga) is a Latvian film director. Kalējs was one of four contributing directors awarded the Lielais Kristaps Best Film award in 2007 for the film Vogelfrei.
