= Akvelīna Līvmane =

Latvian actress and astrologer (born 1951)

Akvelīna Līvmane (born 13 July 1951, in Dubna Parish) is a Latvian actress and astrologer. She received the Lielais Kristaps award for Best Actress in 2005.
