= Ansis Epners =

Latvian film director (1937–2003)

Ansis Epners (1937–2003) was a Latvian documentarian. He made more than sixty films, of which a number received the Latvian Film Festival's Lielais Kristaps award.
