= The Mover =

2018 film

- Film poster
- Directed by: Dāvis Sīmanis Jr.
- Written by: Dāvis Sīmanis Jr.; Matīss Gricmanis
- Produced by: Gints Grūbe
- Starring: Artūrs Skrastiņš; Ilze Blauberga; Leonīds Lencs; Matīss Kipļuks
- Edited by: Andris Grants; Dāvis Sīmanis Jr.
- Music by: Edgars Rubenis
- Release date: 18 October 2018
- Running time: 90 minutes
- Country: Latvia
- Languages: Latvian; Russian; German; Yiddish

The Mover (Latvian: Tēvs Nakts – 'Father Night') is a 2018 Latvian historical war drama film directed by Dāvis Sīmanis Jr. The film is based on the Latvian novel A Boy and a Dog written by Inese Zandere and illustrated by Reinis Pētersons. It was selected as the Latvian entry for the Best International Feature Film at the 92nd Academy Awards, but was not nominated. In 2019 The Mover was awarded as the best foreign film at Haifa International Film Festival.

== Plot ==
Žanis Lipke, a Latvian dock worker, saves 60 Jews during the German occupation of Latvia during World War II by sheltering them in a bunker under his house and transporting them to safety with the help of his family and friends.

== Cast ==
- Artūrs Skrastiņš as Žanis Lipke
- Ilze Blauberga as Johanna Lipke
- Matīss Kipļuks as Zigis Lipke
- Mihails Karasikovs as Smolansky
- Toms Treinis as Šarja
- Steffen Scheumann as Lēmans
- Imants Erdmans as German Officer
- Madara Paegļkalns as Mina
- Arnis Ozols as Blūms
- Henrijs Arājs as Alfrēds Lipke
- Elza Alberiņa as Aina Lipke

== Awards and nominations ==
Year	Award	Category	Result
2018	Lielais Kristaps	Best Director (Dāvis Sīmanis Jr.)	Won
2018	Lielais Kristaps	Best actress in a supporting role (Ilze Blauberga)	Won
2018	Lielais Kristaps	Best Cinematographer (Andrejs Rudzāts)	Won
2018	Lielais Kristaps	Best Production designer (Kristīne Jurjāne)	Won
2018	Lielais Kristaps	Best Film (Antra Gaile, Gints Grūbe, Mistrus Media)	Nominated
2018	Lielais Kristaps	Best Actor (Artūrs Skrastiņš)	Nominated
2018	Lielais Kristaps	Best Screenplay (Dāvis Sīmanis Jr., Matīss Gricmanis)	Nominated
2018	Lielais Kristaps	Best Costume Design (Kristīne Jurjāne)	Nominated
2018	Lielais Kristaps	Best Make-Up (Sarmīte Balode)	Nominated
2018	Lielais Kristaps	Best Score (Edgars Rubenis)	Nominated
2018	Lielais Kristaps	Best Sound (Vladimir Golovnitskiy)	Nominated
2018	Lielais Kristaps	Best Editing (Andris Grants, Dāvis Sīmanis Jr.)	Nominated
2019	Moscow International Film Festival	Russian Film Clubs Federation Award	Won
2019	Moscow International Film Festival	Best Film (Golden St. George)	Nominated
2019	Haifa International Film Festival	Best Foreign Film	Won

== See also ==
- List of submissions to the 92nd Academy Awards for Best International Feature Film
- List of Latvian submissions for the Academy Award for Best International Feature Film
