= Defenders of Riga =

2007 film

- Cover of Scandinavian release
- Directed by: Aigars Grauba
- Written by: Andris Kolbergs; Valentins Jemeļjanovs; Lisa Eichhorn; Andrejs Ēķis; Aigars Grauba
- Produced by: Andrejs Ēķis
- Starring: Jānis Reinis; Elita Kļaviņa; Artūrs Skrastiņš
- Cinematography: Gvido Skulte
- Edited by: Līga Pipare
- Music by: Aigars Grauba
- Release date: 11 November 2007
- Country: Latvia
- Languages: Latvian, German, Russian
- Budget: LVL 2.2 million

Defenders of Riga (Latvian: Rīgas sargi) is a 2007 Latvian feature film directed by Aigars Grauba starring Elita Kļaviņa, Jānis Reinis, and Artūrs Skrastiņš. The film depicts the Latvian defense of Riga in November 1919 during its War of Independence. It was selected as the Latvian entry for the Best International Feature Film at the 81st Academy Awards, but was not nominated.

With a budget of over 2 million lats, Defenders of Riga was the most expensive Latvian film at the time.

== Cast ==
- Jānis Reinis as Mārtiņš
- Elita Kļaviņa as Elza
- Ģirts Krūmiņš as Pavel Bermondt
- Romualds Ancāns as Rüdiger von der Goltz
- Indra Briķe as Countess
- Vilis Daudziņš as Paulis
- Uldis Dumpis as Priest
- Kęstutis Jakštas as Kārlis Ulmanis
- Andris Keišs as Ernests Savickis
- Ģirts Ķesteris as Arnolds
- Artūrs Skrastiņš as Jēkabs
- Agris Māsēns as Augusts Savickis

== Reception ==
Five weeks after the premiere it had been viewed by 262,000 people, making it the most-watched film in Latvia since the regaining of independence.

=== Awards and nominations ===
Year	Award	Category	Result
2008	Lielais Kristaps	Best Supporting Actress (Ināra Slucka)	Won
2008	Lielais Kristaps	Best Production Design (Mārtiņš Milbrets)	Won
2008	Lielais Kristaps	Best Supporting Actor (Pēteris Krilovs)	Nominated
2008	Lielais Kristaps	Best Supporting Actor (Ģirts Krūmiņš)	Nominated
2008	Lielais Kristaps	Best Costume Design (Sandra Sila)	Nominated
2008	Lielais Kristaps	Best Make-Up (Emīlija Eglīte)	Nominated

== Production ==
The shooting of the film began in the spring of 2004. The outdoor scenes were shot at the 8.5 hectare Cinevilla backlot in Tukums, Latvia, where parts of Riga's Old Town and Riga's Pārdaugava district were built especially for Defenders of Riga. Around 200 extras took part in the film's battle scenes. It was the first Latvian film to make an extensive use of special effects and computer graphics.
