= Kristīne Nevarauska =

Latvian actress (born 1981)

Kristīne Nevarauska-Atkočūne
- Born: Kristīne Nevarauska; 3 March 1981 (age 44); Bauska, Latvia
- Occupation: Actress

Kristīne Nevarauska-Atkočūne (born 3 March 1981) is a Latvian actress. In the theater, since 2005, she has worked for Dailes teātris, but between 2001 and 2005 she worked for Valmieras Drāmas teātris. She has also taken part in several films.

In 2003 Kristīne received Lielais Kristaps for her role in Sauja ložu. In 2004 she received Shooting Stars Award, which is annually presented to ten young European actors at the Berlin International Film Festival. In 2019 she won her second Best Actress prize at the Lielais Kristaps awards.

== Filmography ==
Year	Film	Role	Release date (flag: country specific)	Notes
2001	Pa ceļam aizejot	Viva	2001	
2002	Sauja ložu	Liene	2002	
2005	Man patīk, ka meitene skumst		2005	
2007	Neprāta cena	Līga	2007	TV series (298 episodes)
2007	Midsummer Madness	Cilda	February 10, 2007	
2009	Ugunsgrēks	Līga	2009	TV series
2010	Hong Kong Confidential	Lori	September 16, 2010	
2011	Dancis pa trim	Sandra/Eva	3 March 2011	
2015	Saplēstā Krūze	Liesma	2015	TV series
2016	Svingeri	Ilze	2016	
2021	Viņas melo labāk	Jana	2013	TV series
