= Baiba Broka (actress) =

Latvian actress

- Born: Baiba Broka; 7 January 1973 (age 52); Riga, Latvian SSR, Soviet Union
- Occupation: Actor

Baiba Broka (born 7 January 1973) is a Latvian stage, television and film actress.

== Career ==
Born in Riga, Latvia, Broka began her film career in the 1992 Dzidra Ritenberga-directed drama Valsis mūža garumā (English release title: Waltzing Through Love), for which she won the Lielais Kristaps award, Latvia's highest prize awarded in cinema. Broka has also had high-profile roles in the 2004 Varis Brasla-directed comedy Waterbomb for the Fat Tomcat, where she plays the lovestruck aunt Una who is forced to look after her two young nieces Marta and Linda. The film won several awards, including the Children's Jury Prizes: Live-Action Feature Film or Video Certificate of Excellence from the Chicago International Children's Film Festival, USA and the Lielais Kristaps award for Feature Film and Best Screenplay.

Baiba Broka is possibly best known internationally for her role as Brigita, in the 1999 Latvian-Swedish co-production of the romantic drama film Svar med foto (English release title: Reply with Photo). Directed by Una Celma, the film follows the relationship between a young, lonely Latvian woman (Broka) who replies to a personal ad placed by a shy Swedish scientist (played by Samuel Fröler). Svar med foto was the first co-production equally financed by both Latvian and Swedish film studios. Since 2007, Broka has been a regular cast member on the Latvian television series Neprāta cena.

For her work as a stage actress, Baiba Broka has won the Latvian Theatre Union Lilita Bērziņa Award and is a performing member of the New Riga Theatre.

== Personal life ==
Broka is one of three siblings; she has a brother Normunds Broks and an actress sister Ieva Broka. Her parents are Antons Broks and Māra Broka. She has a long-term relationship with film sound director Gatis Builis, and two children: a daughter Barbara (born 16 November 2008) and a son Teodors (born 12 March 2010).

== Selected filmography ==
- Valsis mūža garumā (1990) Lielais Kristaps award as a best actress
- Waterbomb for the Fat Tomcat (Ūdensbumba resnajam runcim) (2004)
- Neprāta cena TV Series (2007)
- Return of Sergeant Lapins (Seržanta Lapiņa atgriešanās) (2010)
- The Chronicles of Melanie (Melānijas hronika) (2016)
- Homo Novus (2018)
