= Dawn (2015 film) =

2015 Latvian film by Laila Pakalniņa

- Theatrical release poster
- Directed by: Laila Pakalniņa
- Written by: Laila Pakalniņa
- Starring: Vilis Daudziņš
- Release dates: 18 November 2015 (BNFF); 23 November 2015 (Latvia)
- Running time: 96 minutes
- Country: Latvia
- Language: Latvian

Dawn (Latvian: Ausma) is a 2015 black-and-white Latvian drama film directed by Laila Pakalniņa, based on the story of Soviet student Pavlik Morozov, who denounced his father. The plot then tells the story of Jānis, who lives in the "Dawn" kolkhoz in 1950s Soviet-occupied Latvia and who denounces his anti-Soviet father, who later exactes revenge on Jānis.

It was selected as the Latvian entry for the Best Foreign Language Film at the 89th Academy Awards but it was not nominated. It's a co-production with Poland and Estonia.

== Cast ==
- Vilis Daudziņš as the Father
- Antons Grauds
- Andris Keišs
- Liena Šmukste
- Wiktor Zborowski

== See also ==
- List of submissions to the 89th Academy Awards for Best Foreign Language Film
- List of Latvian submissions for the Academy Award for Best Foreign Language Film
