= Gulf Stream Under the Iceberg =

2012 film

- DVD cover
- Directed by: Jevgeņijs Paškevičs
- Written by: Jevgeņijs Paškevičs
- Based on: work by Anatole France
- Starring: Ville Haapasalo; Danila Kozlovsky; Aleksei Serebryakov; Anna Azarova; Olga Shepitskaya; Anastasia Kazancheeva; Tatyana Lyutaeva
- Music by: Pavel Karmanov
- Distributed by: Nida Filma (Latvia); Horosho Production (Russia)
- Release dates: 26 June 2012 (Moscow); 12 October 2012 (Latvia)
- Running time: 125 minutes
- Countries: Latvia; Russia; Malta; Austria
- Language: Russian
- Budget: €2,300,000

Gulf Stream Under the Iceberg (Latvian: Golfa straume zem ledus kalna) is a 2012 Latvian drama film directed by Jevgeņijs Paškevičs. It is an artistic retelling of the story of Lilith, the first wife of Adam. The film was selected as the Latvian entry for the Best Foreign Language Oscar at the 85th Academy Awards, but it did not make the final shortlist.

== Cast ==
- Olga Shepitskaya
- Rēzija Kalniņa
- Ģirts Ķesteris
- Jānis Reinis
- Uldis Dumpis
- Pēteris Liepiņš
- Vigo Roga
- Regnārs Vaivars
- Aleksey Serebryakov
- Ksenia Rappoport
- Danila Kozlovsky
- Ville Haapasalo
- Yuriy Tsurilo
- Ekaterina Vilkova
- Anna Azarova
- Elena Morozova
- Tatyana Lyutaeva

== See also ==
- List of submissions to the 85th Academy Awards for Best Foreign Language Film
- List of Latvian submissions for the Academy Award for Best Foreign Language Film
