= Mother, I Love You =

2013 Latvian film by Jānis Nords

- Film poster
- Directed by: Jānis Nords
- Written by: Jānis Nords
- Starring: Kristofers Konovalovs
- Cinematography: Tobias Datum
- Release dates: February 2013 (Berlin); 14 February 2013 (Latvia)
- Running time: 83 minutes
- Country: Latvia
- Language: Latvian

Mother, I Love You (Latvian: Mammu, es tevi mīlu) is a 2013 Latvian drama film written and directed by Jānis Nords. The film was selected as the Latvian entry for the Best Foreign Language Film at the 86th Academy Awards, but it was not nominated.

The plot follows 13-year-old student Raimonds from Riga and his relationship with his busy and distant mother following a series of mishaps in the course of one week.

== Cast ==
- Kristofers Konovalovs as Raimonds
- Vita Vārpiņa as Raimonds' mother
- Matīss Livčāns as Pēteris
- Indra Briķe as Pēteris' mother

== Awards ==
- Grand Prix of the International Jury of the program Generation KPlus at the Berlin Film Festival
- Best Feature Film Award at the Los Angeles Film Festival
- Best European Film Award at the Zlin Film Festival for Children and Youth, Czech Republic.

== See also ==
- List of submissions to the 86th Academy Awards for Best Foreign Language Film
- List of Latvian submissions for the Academy Award for Best Foreign Language Film
