= Iveta Pole =

Latvian theatre and film actress (born 1981)

Iveta Pole (born January 11, 1981) is a Latvian theatre and film actress, born in Liepāja.

She is affiliated with Jaunais Rīgas teātris (New Riga Theatre) led by Alvis Hermanis and has played parts in theatre shows Latvian Stories (2004, director Alvis Hermanis), Ice (2006, director Alvis Hermanis), Sound of Silence (2007, director Alvis Hermanis) and Look Back In Anger (2008, director Varis Pinkis).
