= Andris Keišs =

Latvian actor

- Born: 26 November 1974 (age 51); Latvian SSR, Soviet Union
- Occupation: Actor

Andris Keišs (born 26 November 1974) is a Latvian actor. In the theatre, he has appeared in several plays of Alvis Hermanis and Māra Ķimele. He has also taken part in several films.

In 2005 he received the Union of Latvian Theatre Workers best actor award and has won the Lielais Kristaps award four times (2000, 2012, 2015 and 2016), more than any other actor.

== Filmography ==
Year	Film	Role	Release date (flag: country specific)	Notes
1997	Vienas vasaras zieds		1997	
1999	Jaunsaimnieks un velns		1999	
2000	Pa ceļam aizejot	Vilnis	2000	
2002	Inspektors Grauds	Inspektors Grauds	2002	TV mini-series
2005	Krišana	Alina's Husband	5 July 2005	
2007	Neprāta cena	Raimonds	2007	TV series (165 episodes)
2007	Defenders of Riga	Ernests Savickis	11 November 2007	
2009	Medības	Gints	11 September 2009	
2010	Rūdolfa mantojums		15 January 2010	
2010	Return of Sergeant Lapins	Krists	26 November 2010	
2011	Kolka Cool	Gvido	16 December 2011	
2012	Üksik saar			Estonian film
2015	Dawn		18 November 2015	
2016	Gūtenmorgens un Vienciems	Gūtenmorgens	18 November 2016	LTV1 film
2017	Loveless	Anton	1 June 2017	Russian film
2018	The Pagan King	Ulup	17 January 2018	
2018	Homo Novus	Salutaurs	26 September 2018	
