= Elita Kļaviņa =

Latvian actress and journalist

- Born: Elita Kļaviņa; 3 November 1966 (age 58); Jēkabpils, Latvia
- Occupation: Actress

Elita Kļaviņa (born 3 November 1966) is a Latvian actress and a former journalist. In the theater she has worked for Jaunais Rīgas Teātris. She has also taken part in several films.

== Filmography ==
Year	Film	Role	Release date	Notes
1991	Mērnieku laiki	Liena	1991	
1992	Līduma dūmi	Marija	1992	TV series
1998	Tumsas puķe	Inese	1998	TV series
2000	Pa ceļam aizejot	Ilga	2000	
2001	Paslēpes		12 November 2001	
2006	Tumšie brieži	Aija	15 September 2006	
2007	Rīgas sargi	Elza	11 November 2007	
2009	Ofitsery 2: Vsyo budet horosho		2009	TV series
