= Midsummer Madness (2007 film) =

2007 film by Alexander Hahn

- Directed by: Alexander Hahn
- Written by: Joe W. Wrist
- Story by: Alexander Hahn
- Starring: Orlando Wells; Gundars Āboliņš; Maria de Medeiros; Dominique Pinon; Chulpan Khamatova
- Cinematography: Jerzy Palacz
- Music by: Klaus Hundsbichler
- Release date: 12 October 2007 (Austria)
- Running time: 94 mins.
- Countries: Latvia; Lithuania; Austria
- Languages: Latvian; English; Russian; French
- Budget: $3,500,000 (estimated)

Midsummer Madness (Latvian: Jāņu nakts) is a 2007 romantic comedy-drama film directed by Alexander Hahn and written by Joe W. Wrist. It is about six different stories all taking place in Latvia during the Latvian national festivities of Jāņi. One of the stories shows a French woman (played by Maria de Medeiros) who brings the ashes of her late husband to Latvia, believing it to be the same country as Lithuania as she wants to spread her husband's ashes near the Hill of Crosses, which is in Lithuania. She eventually gets to the hill of crosses and this shows the only part of the film outside of Latvia.

== Cast ==
- Orlando Wells – Curt (later Kurts)
- Gundars Āboliņš – Oskars
- Maria de Medeiros – Livia
- Dominique Pinon - Toni
- Chulpan Khamatova – Aida
- Tobias Moretti – Pēteris
- Victor McGuire – Mike
- Detlev Buck – Axel
- Roland Düringer – Karl
- Birgit Minichmayr – Maja
- Daniil Spivakovskiy – Foma
- Aurelija Anužytė – Natasha
- Dainis Porgants – Purviņš
- Yevgeni Sitokhin – Leonid
- Imbi Strenga – Mārīte
- James-William Watts – Lewis
- Benito Sambo – Yuki
