= Latvian National Theatre =

Theatre in Riga, Latvia

Coordinates: 56°57′13″N 24°06′18″E

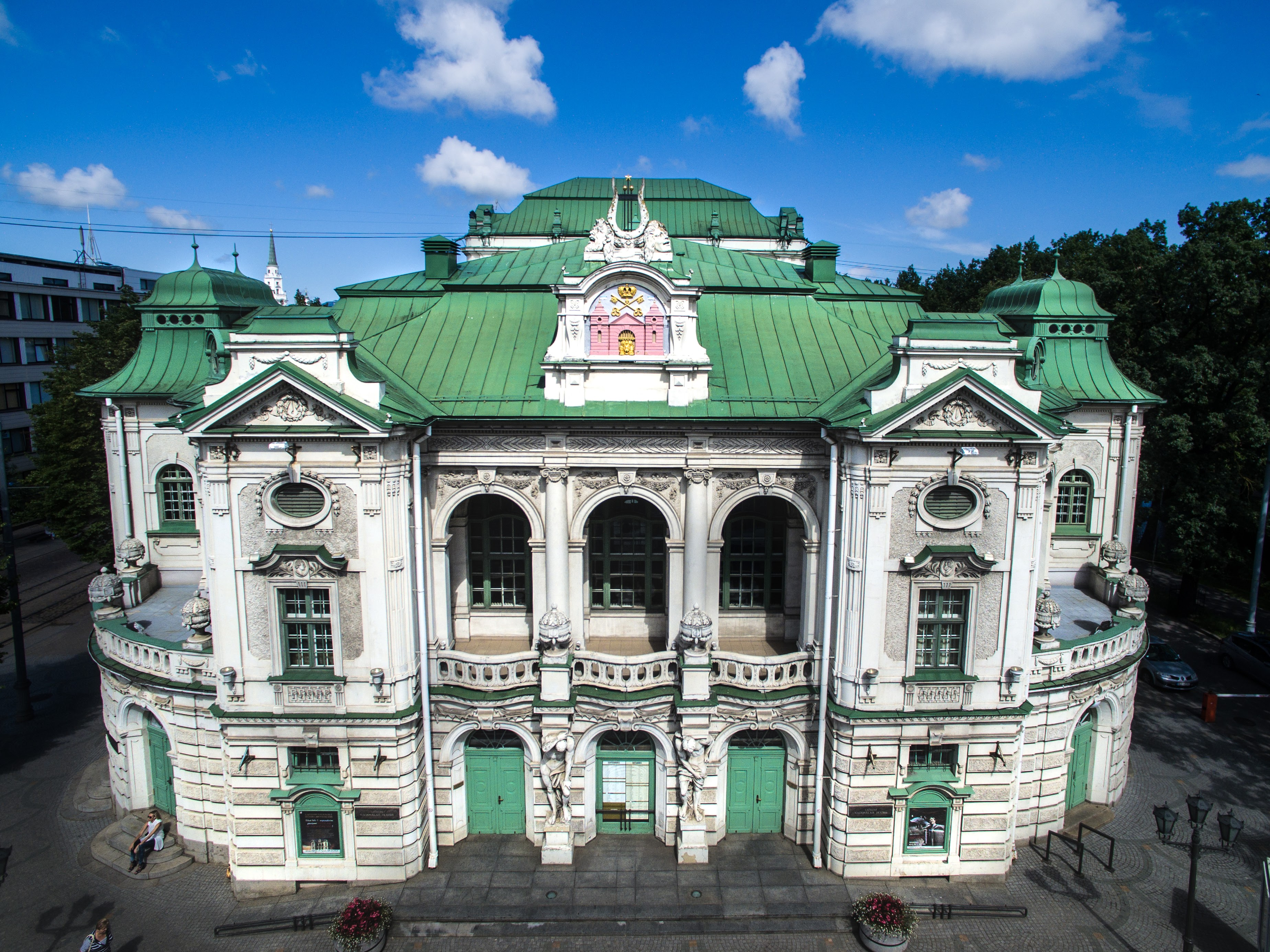
- Interactive map of the Latvian National Theatre area

General information
- Architectural style: Historicism
- Location: Rīga, Latvia
- Construction started: 1899
- Completed: 1902
- Client: Riga City Council

Design and construction
- Architect: August Reinberg

The Latvian National Theatre (Latvian: Latvijas Nacionālais teātris) is one of the leading professional theatres in Latvia. The building is in the eclectic style and is an architectural and artistic monument. The country of Latvia was proclaimed in this building in the year 1918. On 23 February 2002, the theatre celebrated its 100th anniversary. The director of National Theatre of Latvia since 2006 has been Ojārs Rubenis.

== History ==
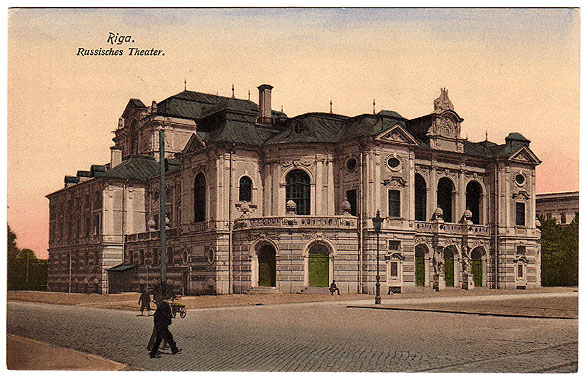
The theatre building sometime between 1910 and 1918

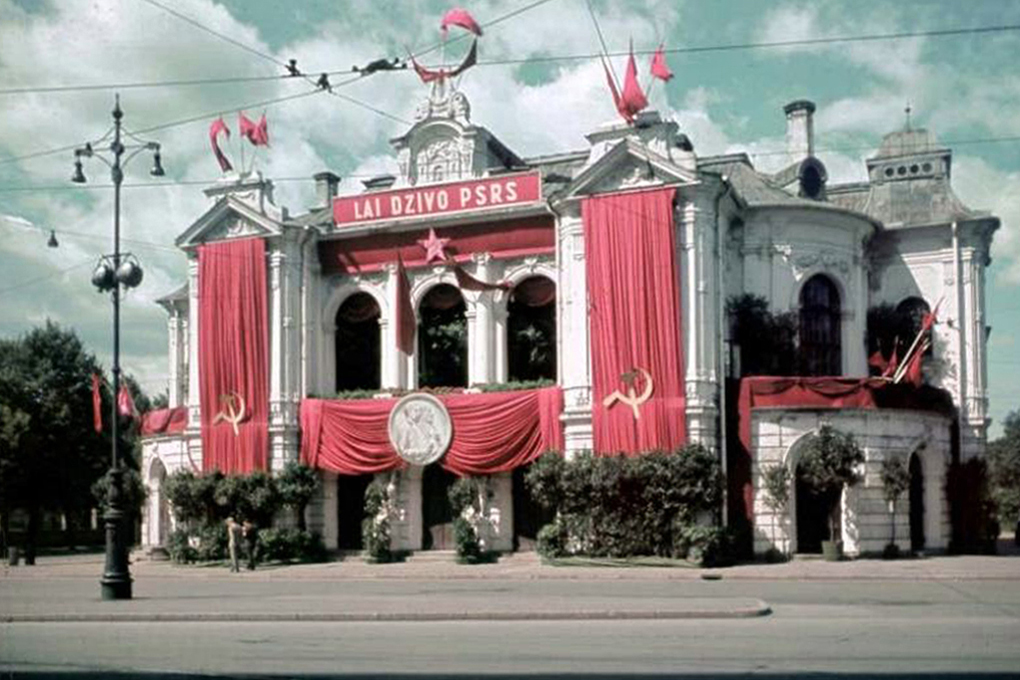
Latvian National Theatre decorated with Soviet symbols after the Soviet occupation in 1940

In 1897 Riga's city council decided that it was not enough to have just one theatre in Riga. Riga's first theatre was the German Theatre, currently the Opera House. A competition was held to choose the design of the new building. The Augusts Reinbergs project "Dum spiro, spero" ("While I breathe, I hope") won and construction began, mainly funded by local Russian merchants and some nobility. The theatre was opened to the public on 14 September 1902 as Riga's Second (Russian) theatre (Rīgas 2. pilsētas (krievu) teātris) and held both theatre and opera performances. Although this was Russian language theatre, by 1917 Riga Latvian Society was renting the premises to hold plays in Latvian.

During the First World War the theatre was evacuated, but by 1918 it was already back in business, and on 15 October staged Richard Wagner's The Flying Dutchman. Just over a month later, Latvia declared its independence, with the declaration being read from the theatre's stage. The only remaining photograph from this historic event was taken in the theatre's main hall.

In 1919, during a brief period of Bolshevik rule, the makeshift government named it the Workers' Theatre (Strādnieku teātris), but it became the Latvian National Theatre soon after and on 30 November the official opening took place with a staging of Rūdolfs Blaumanis "Ugunī" ("In Fire"). The creative program was authored by Jānis Akurāters, a Latvian writer, then head of the Art department of the Ministry of Education.

After the Soviet occupation of Latvia in 1940, the name of the theatre was deemed too nationalistic, so it was renamed to Riga's Dramatic Theatre (Rīgas Drāmas teātris), only to restore the previous name in 1988, 3 years before Latvia regained its independence.

The current managing director of the theatre is Ojārs Rubenis and the artistic director is Edmunds Freibergs.

== Mission ==
The mission of Latvia's National Theatre is to be the centre of national culture and art with the goal of introducing the art of theatre and current events in culture, through national values, to an even larger part of society.

The National Theatre's vision for the future is to theatrically concentrate theatre's, art's and culture's most valuable pieces, by regularly introducing Latvian classics, original work, foreign theatre experience and current events to the viewer.

There are also plans to include the most interesting and the most talented professionals, continue the development of theatre as an art form, as well as strengthen the collaboration between theatres and other cultural organizations.

The guidelines for the National Theatre's development ensure the chance for the viewer to be introduced to all the events happening in the life of theatre in Latvia and with the most valuable foreign plays, as well as an opportunity to be a part of some of the best of the National Theatre's plays that are in the international circle.

== Location ==
The Latvian National Theatre is situated in the centre of Latvia's capital city Riga, on the bank of the Riga Canal. Located just outside the Old Town, it stands in a park where the Citadel used to be.

== Layout ==
The building is a combination of style; the facade has both eclectic and baroque features as well as elements of Art Nouveau, which was extremely popular in Riga at the time. The interior is very functional, but in the various ornaments, you can find elements of classicism. There are three halls in the theatre: the Great Hall (with 750 seats), the Actors Hall (with, depending on the play, 50–90 seats), and the LMT New Hall (with, depending on the play, 60–120 seats). Some seasons there is a fourth hall, "The Horror Bus", where a play by that name is held for children.

== Actors ==
There are 49 actors, 23 freelance actors and 17 directors in the group.

=== Theatre group ===
- Ainārs Ančevskis
- Kaspars Aniņš
- Uldis Anže
- Jānis Āmanis
- Romāns Bargais
- Marija Bērziņa
- Dace Bonāte
- Madara Bore
- Madara Botmane
- Mārtiņš Brūveris
- Indra Burkovska
- Raimonds Celms
- Ilva Centere
- Agnese Cīrule
- Maija Doveika
- Uldis Dumpis
- Mārtiņš Egliens
- Daiga Gaismiņa
- Gundars Grasbergs
- Juris Hiršs
- Ģirts Jakovļevs
- Zane Jančevska
- Astrīda Kairiša
- Daiga Kažociņa
- Anna Klēvere
- Ivars Kļavinskis
- Arturs Krūzkops
- Lāsma Kugrēna
- Normunds Laizāns
- Juris Lisners
- Ģirts Liuziniks
- Dita Lūriņa
- Mārcis Maņjakovs
- Egils Melbārdis
- Inga Misāne-Grasberga
- Ivars Puga
- Sanita Pušpure
- Kārlis Reijers
- Liene Sebre
- Uldis Siliņš
- Jānis Skanis
- Evija Skulte
- Ināra Slucka
- Jurģis Spulenieks
- Igors Šelegovskis
- Voldemārs Šoriņš
- Jānis Vimba
- Līga Zeļģe
- Kaspars Zvīgulis

=== Freelance actors ===
- Anta Aizupe
- Zane Aļļēna
- Lolita Cauka
- Alise Danovska
- Zane Dombrovska
- Artis Drozdovs
- Kaspars Dumburs
- Rasma Garne
- Baiba Indriksone
- Juris Jope
- Kristians Kareļins
- Kārlis Krūmiņš
- Ance Kukule
- Kristaps Ķeselis
- Līga Liepiņa
- Marija Linarte
- Zigurds Neimanis
- Uldis Norenbergs
- Ilze Rudolfa
- Inta Tirole
- Arno Upenieks
- Māra Zemdega
- Ausma Ziemele
