= Alvis Hermanis =

Latvian director

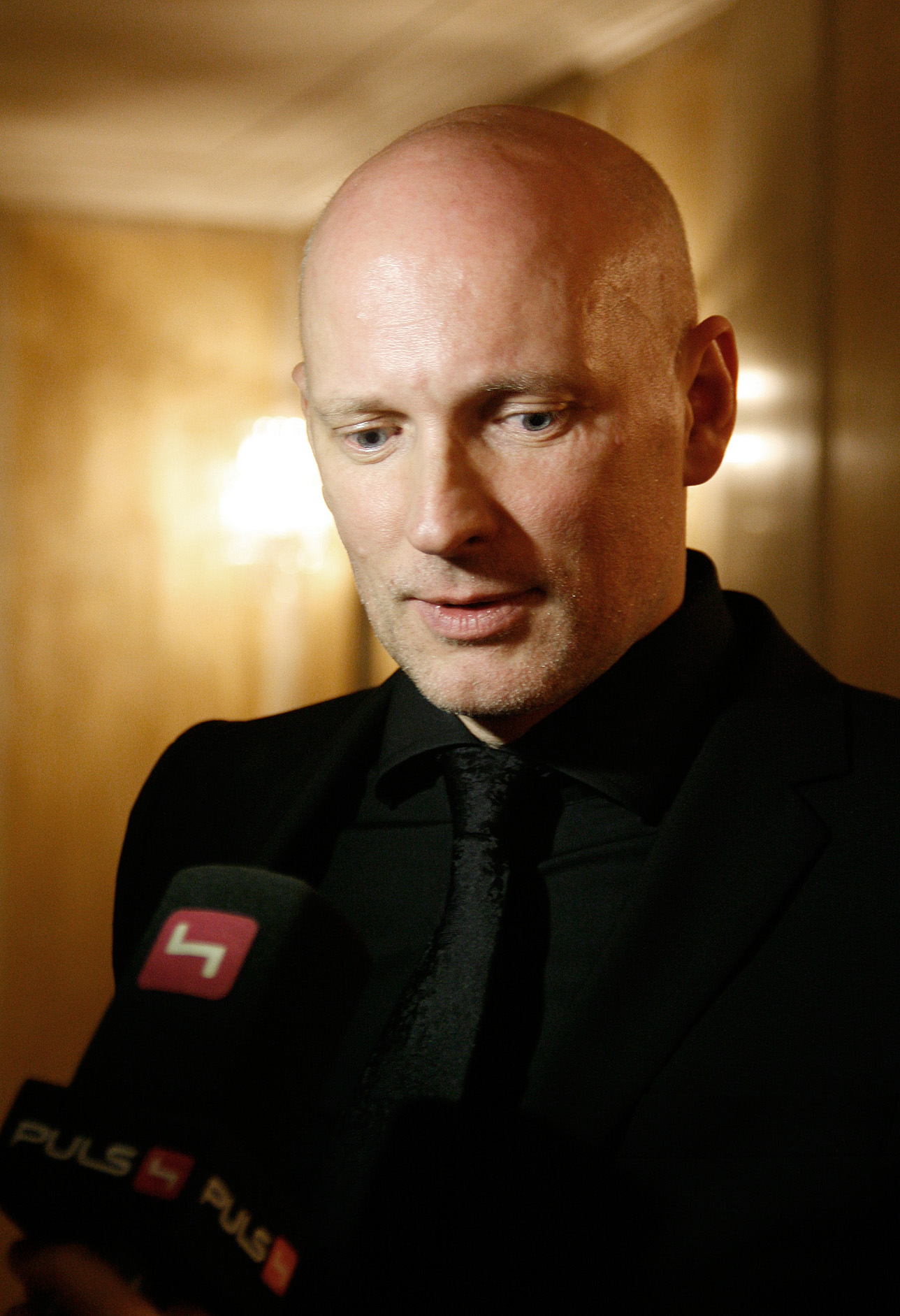
- Hermanis in 2010

President of the We Change the Rules Party
- Incumbent
- Assumed office 10 February 2026
- Preceded by: Ēriks Pucens

Personal details
- Born: Alvis Hermanis; April 27, 1965 (age 61) Riga, Latvian SSR, Soviet Union
- Party: We Change the Rules
- Spouse: Kristīne Krūze-Hermane
- Children: 7
- Education: Jāzeps Vītols Latvian Academy of Music
- Occupation: Theatre director • Actor • Politician

Alvis Hermanis (born 27 April 1965) is a Latvian theatre director, set designer and actor. Since 1997 he has worked at the New Riga Theatre (Latvian: Jaunais Rīgas teātris) as artistic director.

== Early life and education ==
Hermanis was born in Riga and in his early teens he played hockey in Dinamo Riga sports school. He was forced to leave sport at the age of 15 for health reasons. He obtained his first theatre and stage experience when he attended Riga pantomime studio under Roberts Ligers. From 1981 until 1982 Hermanis attended the Riga Peoples artist studio. He continued his education from 1984 until 1988 in the theatre department of Latvian State conservatory.

== Career ==
As an actor, Hermanis appeared in several feature films in the late 1980s.

Aside from at the New Riga Theatre, Hermanis has directed several plays in Austria, Germany, Russia, Switzerland and elsewhere, and a number of New Riga Theatre plays have toured the whole of Europe.

In 2003, Hermanis directed Nikolai Gogol's The Government Inspector at the Salzburg Festival in Austria, which won the Young Director's Award. This success paved his way for a long-lasting career in German-speaking theatre, starting in Frankfurt and at the Ruhrtriennale, then in Berlin, Zürich and Vienna. He has frequently worked at the Burgtheater, Austria's national theatre, where he presented Arthur Schnitzler's Das weite Land in 2011 and a new version of Gogol's The Government Inspector in 2015.

Around 2009 Hermanis adapted eight of Vasily Shukshin's short stories for stage in a collaboration with the Theatre of Nations in Moscow, entitled Shukshin's Stories (or Shukhsin's Tales). As of 2021 it is still touring the world, and has won several awards. Starring Evgeny Mironov, the play was staged at The Barbican in London in October 2019.

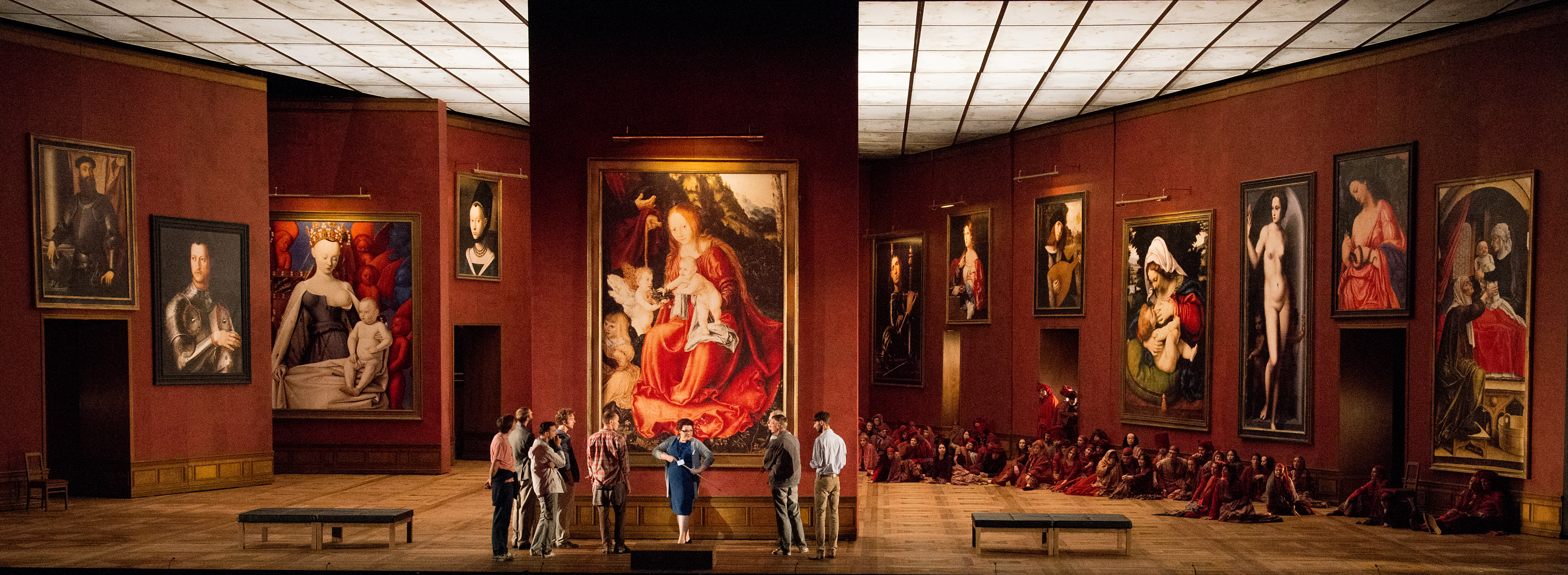
Hermanis' Il trovatore at the Salzburg Festival, 2014

Since 2012, Hermanis has also directed and created sets for opera productions – first being invited by the Salzburg Festival to stage Bernd Alois Zimmermann's Die Soldaten conducted by Ingo Metzmacher. The following year, again in Salzburg, Hermanis presented Harrison Birtwistle's opera Gawain.

In 2014 he was responsible for a production of Il trovatore with Anna Netrebko, Marie-Nicole Lemieux, Francesco Meli and Plácido Domingo. Hermanis transformed the Great Festival Hall into a gigantic museum with moving walls and the singers into museum custodians and personalities from the paintings shown.

In 2015 Hermanis cancelled a production with the Thalia Theater planned for spring 2016. In a statement, he also mentioned the theatre's position as a "Refugees Welcome Center" as one of the reasons.

Hermanis has seven children, including 3 with his wife, Latvian actress Kristīne Krūze.

== Awards and recognition ==
For his role in Fotogrāfija ar sievieti un mežakuili he received the Best Actor Award at the Lielais Kristaps festival in 1987.

In 2003, Hermanis and his theatre won the Young Director's Award at the Salzburg Festival with Nikolai Gogols The Government Inspector.

In 2007, he was awarded the IX Europe Prize Theatrical Realities, in Thessaloniki.

In 2007 Hermanis refused to receive the Order of the Three Stars from the hands of the president Valdis Zatlers. He eventually received it in 2012, when Zatlers had already left office.

In 2012 Swiss culture magazine du surveyed theatre experts from 20 different countries and included Hermanis on the list of the ten most influential European theatre personalities of the past decade.

== Europe Theatre Prize ==
In 2007, he received the IX Europe Prize Theatrical Realities, in Thessaloniki, with the following motivation:

The founder of the New Riga Theatre, Alvis Hermanis has a fantastic memory for the details and objects of ordinary life. He is one of those few who appreciate the disappearing reality. He may not always love it but he does appreciate it. He looks into the past with a nostalgia tinted with irony and tries not to stylize but to reconstruct it. In his famous “Revisor” (Government Inspector) a typical Russian story was turned into a typical Soviet one. One can watch it and recollect the smell of Kasa, the occasional glimpse of a bright red slip peeping from under a loud printed cotton dress, and female faces changed by layers of cheap cosmetics. The real hero of this and many other Hermanis’ productions was time, a time that stood still. And it’s possible to say where. It stopped in our memory and it’s really difficult to part with it. It’s not worn out. The Latvian director was a young man in the Soviet time; he came to maturity when his country got independence. He looks at the former USSR simultaneously from inside and outside. And that’s why his look is both detached and involved. This double perspective imparts a surprising stereoscopic quality even to simple jokes. “Long Life”, which has recently become a European hit, also appeals to our memory. Have you ever visited lonely old people? Do you remember the ugly heaps of shabby things crammed into their flats? They take up valuable space and air but their owners can’t throw them away, because their past life is embodied in them. In Hermanis’s production, those heaps are reproduced with talented meticulousness. Among their old photographs, rugs, plaids and battered sofas, five old people swarm, grunt, quarrel and love each other from dawn till sunset. They are played by young actors who keep a skilful balance between grotesquerie and realism. A passion for documentation and authenticity is a sign of our time - at least, of our time as it is perceived by theatre. It’s no accidentally that one of the most fashionable current playwriting methods is verbatim. Hermanis is also a master of verbatim but of theatrical verbatim. And hardly anyone can compete him today in this style.
