= List of Latvian films (1962–1990) =

== 1962 ==
1. Diena bez vakara, Māris Rudzītis

== 1963 ==
1. Jolanta, Vladimirs Gorikers
2. Mājiņa kāpās, Arkady Koltsaty and Anatoly Markelov
3. Uz Trases, Rostislavs Gorjajevs

== 1964 ==
1. Cara līgava, Vladimirs Gorikers
2. Cielaviņas armija, Aleksandrs Leimanis
3. Divi, Mihails Bogins
4. Hipokrāta zvērests, Ada Neretniece
5. Kapteinis Nulle, Leonīds Leimanis
6. Līdz rudenim vēl tālu, Aloizs Brenčs
7. Sūtņu sazvērestība, Nikolai Rozantsev
8. Tobago maina kursu, Aleksandrs Leimanis

== 1966 ==
1. Noktirne, Rostislavs Gorjajevs
2. Pēdējais blēdis, Vadim Mass and Jan Ebner
3. Purva bridējs, Leonīds Leimanis
4. Rīta migla, Imants Krenbergs
5. I Remember Everything, Richard (Es visu atceros, Ričard), Rolands Kalniņš

== 1967 ==
1. Kapteiņa Enriko pulkstenis, Jānis Streičs
2. Cīruļi atlido pirmie, Māris Rudzītis
3. Kad lietus un vējš sitas logā, Aloizs Brenčs
4. Four White Shirts (Četri balti krekli)/Breathe Deeply (Elpojiet dziļi), Rolands Kalniņš

== 1968 ==
1. Ilgās dienas rīts, Ada Neretniece
2. 24-25 neatgriežas, Aloizs Brenčs
3. Mērnieku laiki, Voldemārs Pūce
4. Ceļa zīmes, Oļģerts Dunkers
5. Pie bagātās kundzes, Leonīds Leimanis

== 1969 ==
1. Līvsalas zēni, Jānis Streičs
2. Trīskārtēja pārbaude, Aloizs Brenčs
3. Stari stiklā, Imants Krenbergs
4. Baltās kāpas, Sergey Tarasov

== 1970 ==
1. The Devil's Servants (Vella kalpi), Aleksandrs Leimanis
2. Šauj manā vietā, Jānis Streičs
3. Klāvs Mārtiņa dēls, Oļģerts Dunkers
4. Karalienes bruņinieks, Rolands Kalniņš
5. Vārnu ielas republika, Ada Neretniece

== 1971 ==
1. Pilsēta zem liepām, A. Brenčs
2. Meldru mežs, Ē. Lācis
3. In the Shadow of Death (Nāves ēnā), Gunārs Piesis
4. Kara ceļa mantinieki, V. Krūmiņš
5. Tauriņdeja, O. Dunkers
6. Apprecējās vecītis ar večiņu savu, G. Arazjans
7. Salātiņš
8. Egle rudzu laukā, I. Krenbergs

== 1972 ==
1. Kapteinis Džeks, A. Neretniece
2. Peterss, A. Tarasovs
3. Vella kalpi vella dzirnavās, A. Leimanis
4. Ceplis, R. Kalniņš

== 1973 ==
1. Šahs briljantu karalienei, A. Brenčs
2. Pieskāriens, R. Gorjajevs
3. Dāvana vientuļai sievietei, Ē. Lācis
4. Pūt, vējiņi!, Gunārs Piesis
5. Pilsētas atslēgas, I. Krenbergs
6. Gaisma tuneļa galā, A. Brenčs
7. Dunduriņš, B. Ružs
8. Uzbrukums slepenpolicijai, O. Dunkers

== 1974 ==
1. Uzticamais draugs Sančo, Jānis Streičs
2. Apple in the River (Ābols upē), A. Freimanis
3. Motociklu vasara, U. Brauns
4. Melnā vēža spīlēs, A. Leimanis

== 1975 ==
1. My Frivolous Friend (Mans draugs – nenopietns cilvēks), Jānis Streičs
2. Paradīzes atslēgas, A. Brenčs
3. Parunā ar mani, B. Veldre

== 1976 ==
1. The Arrows of Robin Hood, S. Tarasovs
2. Ezera sonāte, Gunārs Cilinskis, Varis Brasla
3. Šīs bīstamās balkona durvis, Dz. Ritenberga
4. Liekam būt, A. Brenčs
5. Ģimenes melodrāma, B. Frumins
6. Zobena ēnā, I. Krenbergs

== 1977 ==
1. Zem apgāztā mēness, Ē. Lācis
2. Atspulgs ūdenī, A. Rozenbergs
3. Vīrietis labākajos gados, O. Dunkers
4. Kļūstiet mana sievasmāte, K. Marsons
5. Dāvanas pa telefonu, A. Brenčs
6. Puika, A. Freimanis

== 1978 ==
1. Tavs dēls, G. Piesis
2. Vīru spēles brīvā dabā, R. Kalniņš, Gunārs Piesis
3. Tāpēc, ka esmu Aivars Līdaks, B. Veldre
4. Pavasara ceļazīmes, Varis Brasla
5. Rallijs, A. Brenčs
6. Aiz stikla durvīm, O. Dunkers

== 1979 ==
1. Nakts bez putniem, G. Cilinskis
2. Atklātā pasaule, A. Leimanis
3. Trīs minūšu lidojums, Dz. Ritenberga
4. Agrā rūsa, G. Cilinskis

== 1980 ==
1. Novēli man lidojumam nelabvēlīgu laiku, Varis Brasla
2. Spāņu variants, Ē. Lācis
3. Vakara variants, Ē. Lācis
4. Ja nebūtu šī skuķa, R. Pīks

== 1981 ==
1. Laikmeta griežos, Gunārs Piesis
2. Izmeklēšanā noskaidrots, A. Neretniece
3. Atcerēties vai aizmirst, Jānis Streičs
4. Spēle, A. Krievs
5. Tarāns, G. Cilinskis
6. A Limousine the Colour of Midsummer's Eve (Limuzīns Jāņu nakts krāsā), Jānis Streičs

== 1982 ==
1. Tereona galva, Varis Brasla
2. Lietus blūzs, O. Dunkers
3. Pats garākais salmiņš, Dz. Ritenberga
4. Īsa pamācība mīlēšanā, I. Krenbergs
5. Svešās kaislības, Jānis Streičs

== 1983 ==
1. Vilkatis Toms, Ē. Lācis
2. Dārzs ar spoku, O. Dunkers
3. Šāviens mežā, R. Pīks
4. Parāds mīlestībā, Varis Brasla
5. Fronte tēva pagalmā, Ē. Lācis
6. Mirāža, Aloizs Brenčs

== 1984 ==
1. Aveņu vīns, A. Krievs
2. Vajadzīga soliste, G. Zemels
3. Kad bremzes netur, G. Cilinskis

== 1985 ==
1. Dubultslazds, A. Brenčs
2. Tikšanās uz Piena ceļa, Jānis Streičs
3. Sprīdītis, Gunārs Piesis
4. Pēdējā indulgence, A. Neretniece
5. Emil's Mischiefs (Emīla nedarbi), Varis Brasla

== 1986 ==
1. Dubultnieks, R. Pīks
2. Apbraucamais ceļš, Ē. Lācis
3. Bailes, G. Cilinskis
4. Kroņa numurs, I. Krenbergs
5. Aizaugušā grāvī viegli krist, Jānis Streičs
6. Is It Easy to Be Young? (Vai viegli būt jaunam?), Juris Podnieks

== 1987 ==
1. Svītas cilvēks, A. Rozenbergs
2. Fotogrāfija ar sievieti un mežakuili, A. Krievs
3. Apstākļu sakritība, V. Beinerte
4. Dīvainā mēnesgaisma, G. Cilinskis
5. Ja mēs to visu pārcietīsim, Rolands Kalniņš

== 1988 ==
1. Viktorija, O. Dunkers
2. Viss kārtībā, O. Rozenbergs
3. Sižeta pagrieziens, P. Krilovs
4. Māja bez izejas, Dz. Ritenberga

== 1989 ==
1. Šausmu dziesma, Jānis Streičs
2. Latvieši!?, G. Zemels
3. Cilvēka dienas, J. Paškēvičs

== 1990 ==
1. Es Esmu Latvietis, Ansis Epners - Lielais Kristaps best documentary award (director's second LK best doc award)

== See also ==
- List of Latvian films before 1962
- List of Latvian films
- Lielais Kristaps national film festival/awards in Riga, Latvia
