= Cinema of Latvia =

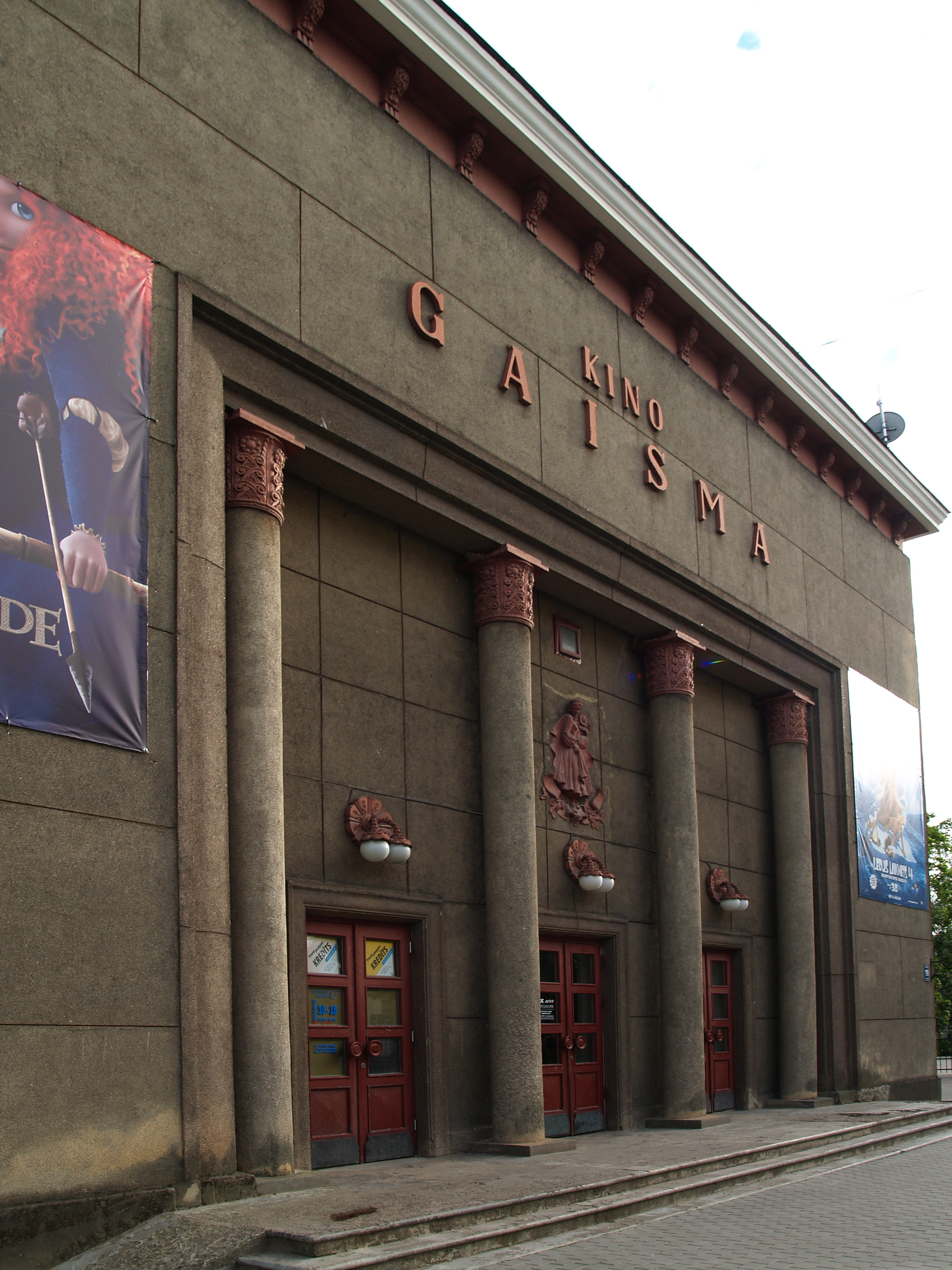
- Cinema "Gaisma" in Valmiera
- No. of screens: 63 (2011)
  - Per capita: 3.4 per 100,000 (2011)
- Main distributors: Forum Cinemas 57.5% Acme Film Latvia 16.5% Incognito Films 5.6

Produced feature films (2011)
- Fictional: 4
- Animated: 1
- Documentary: 1

Number of admissions (2011)
- Total: 1,879,149
  - Per capita: 1.13 (2012)
- National films: 66,337 (3.5%)

Gross box office (2011)
- Total: EUR 7.54 million
- National films: EUR 98,625 (1.3%)

Cinemas of Latvia date back to 1910 when the first short films were made. The first cinematic screening in Riga took place on May 28, 1896. By 1914, all major cities in Latvia had cinemas where newsreels, documentaries, and mostly foreign-made short films were screened.

Two years after cinema was invented by the Lumiere brothers, on 22 January 1898, Sergei Eisenstein was born in Riga.

== History ==
=== Before Soviet occupation ===
The first Latvian feature film Lāčplēsis directed by Aleksandrs Rusteiķis was released in 1930. The Fisherman's Son (1939), directed by Vilis Jānis Lapenieks, is considered a Latvian classic ending the era of filmmaking before the outbreak of World War II.

=== Soviet period ===
After the Soviet occupation of Latvia in 1940, Lapenieks emigrated and after the end of the war, his son Vilis Lapenieks began his film-making career abroad, where he has been credited internationally as a cinematographer on more than 63 titles.

The Riga Documentary Film Studio was created in Latvia during the first year of Soviet occupation. During the first decades of Soviet rule, filmmakers in Latvia were coming mostly from Soviet Russia and were creating propaganda films to depict the victory of Socialism.

After the death of Stalin in 1953, a more liberal period in the Soviet Union's cultural policies followed. Filmmakers started to enjoy greater artistic control; at the same time, the Soviet State Committee for Cinematography in Moscow provided the money. State censorship body Glavlit and CPSU Department of Culture had the control over releasing the movies.

The first Latvian feature films produced during the era still had to meet the ideological requirements of the Soviet regime: The Story of a Latvian Rifleman (1957) directed by Pāvels Armands and "Tobago" Changes Its Course (1965) directed by Aleksandrs Leimanis were produced.

In 1963, the Riga Film Studio completed the construction of 1890 square metre film studio complex.

In the 1970s, Aleksandrs Leimanis and Gunārs Piesis became the most popular directors in Latvia making a series of historical adventure films. Pūt, vējini ("Blow, Little Wind") (1973) directed by Piesis is a movie based on a play of Latvian poet Rainis. Nāves ēnā (In the Shadow of Death) (1971) is adopted from a story of Rudolfs Blaumanis. One of the most popular films from the era is A Limousine the Colour of Midsummer's Eve (1981) directed by Jānis Streičs, a light parody on the Soviet system.

Juris Podnieks became a director of documentaries in 1979 and his first film Cradle won an award at the Leipzig DOK Festival. In 1981, his The Brothers Kokar took the first prize at Kyiv Youth Festival. In the same year, his film Constellation of Riflemen won honours in the 17th All-State Festival in Leningrad and the Latvian Komsomol prize. This film gave Podnieks wide recognition within the Soviet Union.

Podnieks gained international recognition thanks to his movie Is It Easy to Be Young?. The film with dialogue in both Latvian and Russian was an exploration of Soviet youth. As the Soviet Union collapsed, Podnieks cooperated with British television to give first-hand insight on events in the Soviet Union. Over three years, Podnieks filmed a five-part documentary titled Hello, do you hear us?. Later, Podnieks filmed movies that focused on the rise of national identity in Latvia, Lithuania and Estonia. His movie Homeland was an account of folk festivals in these countries when national songs which had been banned by the Soviet regime for 50 years, were sung by massed choirs. While filming a follow-up to this movie in January 1991, Podnieks and crew came under sniper fire during the attempted coup by Soviet forces in Riga. Podnieks was beaten up, his cameraman and long-time friend Andris Slapiņš killed and Gvido Zvaigzne, another collaborator and friend of Podnieks, died of injuries later. This material was captured on video and showed as an addition to Homeland, and later as an introduction for the revised version of this film. Four of Podnieks' films received the Lielais Kristaps prize as best documentary of the year.

Other most notable Latvian directors from the era are Aivars Freimanis and Rolands Kalniņš. Latvia's top film actors during the era were Eduards Pāvuls, Lilita Bārziņa, Gunārs Cilinskis and Kārlis Sebris.

=== Independence ===
After Latvia regained independence in 1991, the most successful Latvian filmmakers have been Jānis Streičs receiving Rights of the Child Award (1994) at the Chicago International Children's Film Festival for Cilvēka bērns (1991); Jānis Putniņš the winner of the Best Film and Best Screenplay at the Latvian National Film Festival in 2007 for Vogelfrei (2007); Varis Brasla whose Ziemassvētku jampadracis (1996) has won Children's Film Award at Würzburg International Filmweekend, the Children's Jury Award at the Chicago International Children's Film Festival.; Aivars Freimanis a nominee for International Independent Award at the International Filmfestival Mannheim-Heidelberg; Una Celma Honorable Mention at the Uppsala International Short Film Festival in 2001; Viestur Kairish whose debut feature film Pa ceļam aizejot (2001) won the Jury Prize at the Raindance Film Festival in 2002.; and Laila Pakalniņa, a winner of several film awards, a nominee for the Golden Berlin Bear at the Berlin International Film Festival for Ūdens (2006).

=== Flow ===
In 2024, Gints Zilbalodis directed an animated feature film, titled Flow, which follows a cat trying to survive along with other animals in a seemingly post-apocalyptic world as the water level gradually rises. The film received international recognition and broke several Latvian box-office records, becoming the most-viewed film in Latvian theatrical history and grossing over €50 million at the global box office.

Due to its recognition, Flow received multiple accolades for animation including the Golden Globe Award for Best Animated Feature Film as well as Academy Award for Best Animated Feature. It also received a nomination for Best International Feature Film as Latvia's submission, becoming the first film from Latvia to win and receive a nomination at the Academy Awards.

== See also ==
- Cinema of the world
