= Sniedze =

Female given name

- Gender: Female
- Name day: December 2

Origin
- Meaning: Snow bunting
- Region of origin: Latvia

Sniedze is a Latvian feminine given name, and also a surname. The name day of people with the given name Sniedze is December 2.

== Notable people with the given name Sniedze ==
- Sniedze Prauliņa (born 1991), Latvian musician

== Notable people with the surname Sniedze ==
- Evita Ašeradena (born Evita Sniedze in 1974), Latvian playwright

== In culture ==
- In the play by Anna Brigadere, Princese Gundega un karalis Brusubārda
