= Lilita Bērziņa =

Latvian actress (1903–1983)

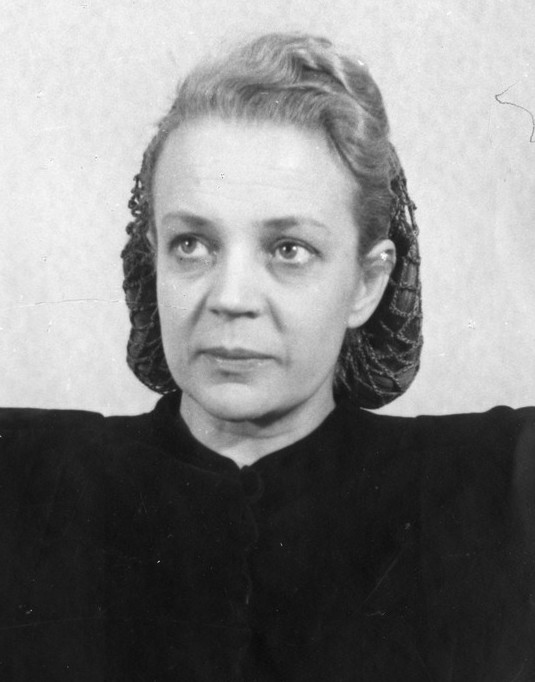
- Born: Lilija Priede-Bērziņa; 17 July 1903; Rīga, Governorate of Livonia, Russian Empire
- Died: 27 May 1983 (aged 79); Rīga, Latvian Soviet Socialist Republic
- Burial place: Forest Cemetery, Riga
- Notable work: Lāčplēsis (1930); A Limousine the Colour of Midsummer's Eve (1981)
- Partner: Jānis Priede

Lilija Priede-Bērziņa, known by her stage name Lilita Bērziņa (17 July 1903 – 27 May 1983) was a Latvian stage and film actress.

== Biography ==
Bērziņa was born on 17 July 1903 in Rīga, Governorate of Livonia, Russian Empire. Her father Dāvis Bērziņš (Note: Hence Lilita Bērziņa's patronym Davidovna (rus. Давыдовна).) was a carpenter and bricklayer and her mother Zelma Bērziņa was a seamstress.

Bērziņa was educated at Riga City Gymnasium No. 3, leaving school in 1919, while also attending the Latvian Youth Union's drama courses.

When she was 19, Bērziņa was cast in the silent film Psyche (1922, directed by Pjotrs Čardinins [lv]), alongside Eduards Smiļģis. After this role, Smiļģis invited her to work in stage productions with him.

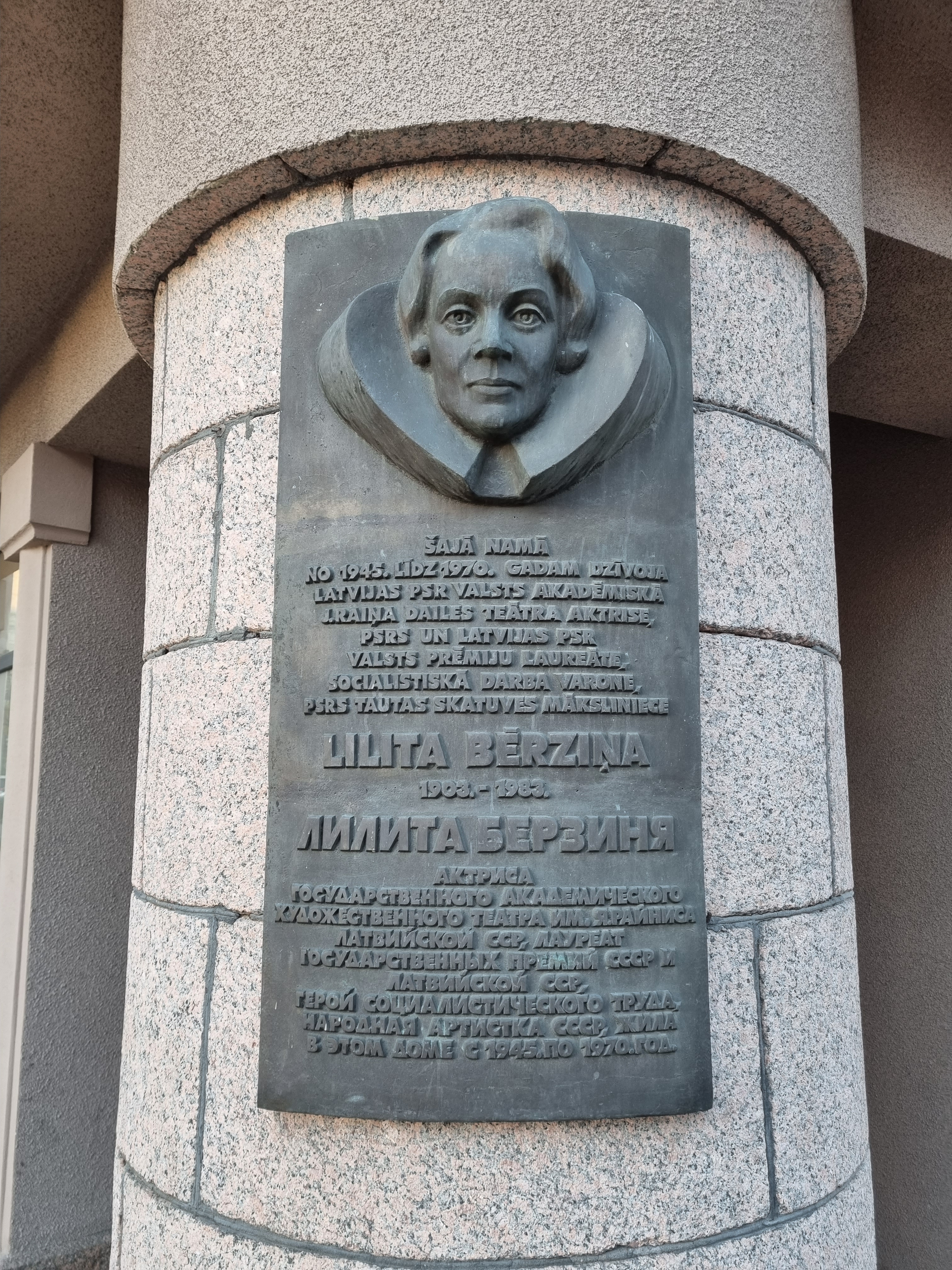
Commemorative plaque to Berzina in Rīga

Bērziņa worked with Smiļģis at the Daile Theatre in Rīga, with her debut role in 1921's Fire and Night. She performed roles including William Shakespeare's heroines Desdemona and Juliet, Johann Wolfgang Goethe's Gretel, Henrik Ibsen's Solveig, Rainis' Asnati and antagonist Spīdola, and Friedrich Schiller's Zanna. Bērziņa also starred in the first latvian full length motion picture Lāčplēsis (1930, based on the national epic poem by Andrejs Pumpurs).

Following World War II, Bērziņa supported the renewal of the Jewish Theatre, unsuccessfully trying to convince the Latvian Communist party leadership to reopen the institution.

After a thirty-year break from acting, Bērziņa returned to the film industry to play older female roles, including in A Limousine the Colour of Midsummer's Eve, Surveyor's Times and Frost in Spring.

Bērziņa died on 27 May 1983 in Rīga, Latvian Soviet Socialist Republic. She was buried at the Forest Cemetery, Riga. She is commemorated on a plaque in Rīga.

== Awards ==
- Order of the Red Banner of Labour (1948 and 1971)
- Cavalier of the Order of Lenin (1965, 1973 and 1978
- Hero of Socialist Labour (1978)
- Stalin Prize
- Meritorious Artist of the Latvian SSR
- People's Artist of the USSR
