= Littlefinger (film) =

- Latvian: Sprīdītis
- Directed by: Gunārs Piesis
- Written by: Gunārs Piesis
- Based on: Sprīdītis by Anna Brigadere
- Starring: Ronalds Neilands; Dace Gasiuna; Dzintra Kletniece
- Release date: April 1986
- Country: Latvia
- Language: Latvian

Littlefinger (Latvian: Sprīdītis, lit. 'Tom Thumb') is a 1986 family fantasy film that was written and directed by Gunārs Piesis. The movie premiered in April 1986 in the Soviet Union at the Alma-Ata All-Union Film Festival and was given a release in Czechoslovakia and East and West Germany in subsequent years. The film adapts Anna Brigadere's play based on the fairy tale of Tom Thumb.

The film was later restored and made available for streaming by the National Film Centre of Latvia, in honor of the director's 85th birthday.

== Plot ==
The king's (Zdenek Rzegorz) palace is invaded by the Devil's messengers and relay to him that the Devil (Miroslav Horacek) will come in three days. He will kidnap and marry Princess Zeltīte (Miroslava Souchkova). The king makes a declaration that anyone who steps up to stop the Devil will be allowed to marry his daughter and he sends his messengers out to spread the word and find him a hero.

Tom Thumb (Sprīdītis) (Ronald Neilands) in the care of his evil stepmother (Dzintra Klētniece), comes across one of the king's messengers who delivers the declaration to Sprīdītis. Against his grandmother (Elvira Baldiņa) and Lienite's (Dace Gasjuna) wishes, runs away in search for adventure and a better life through the king's declaration. During his journey he runs into the Wind Mother (Astrid Kairis), after she saves him from sinking in a swamp. She takes him to a ruined castle to test him, after passing he receives a magical flute and is sent to a field.

Continuing on his journey, Sprīdītis makes his way into a forest where he finds a group of children running from a giant named Lutausis (Miroslav Moravecs), who traps the children in a cave. Sprīdītis confronts Lutausis and makes him dance by playing the flute. Defeating the Lutausis and forcing him to free the children. Afterwards, Sprīdītis is met by the Forest Mother (Mirdza Martinsone) and is given a magical stick.

Sprīdītis eventually gets caught in a storm and seeks shelter at an old house. He bangs on the door and is let in but received coldly by a pair of Scrooges. Sprīdītis wakes up in the night to a knock at the door and answers it to find an old man (Alfred Videnieks) seeking shelter. Sprīdītis lets him into the Scrooges' home and they get mad and demand the old man leaves. The Scrooges put Sprīdītis through trials, where he holds glowing hot coals and where his hand is pierced with a giant needle but the old man heals both wounds. Then Sprīdītis uses the magic stick to make trap the Scrooges in the basement. For his help, the old man gives Sprīdītis a magic ring and disappears.

Sprīdītis leaves and makes his way to the kingdom. As he is watching a play, the king's messengers arrive and read a decree from the king looking for a Hero. Sprīdītis offers to help the king and is brought to the castle. And then the Devil's messengers arrive to prepare for the Devils arrival. Once he arrives, Sprīdītis confronts him and uses his magic tools to defeat him. But Princess Zeltīte doesn't want to marry Sprīdītis and goes to find the witch (Antra Liedskalniņa) to take care of him for her. Though, the witch runs away and doesn't harm Sprīdītis.

In the end Sprīdītis uses the magic ring to turn himself into a bird to travel all the way back home. In his final act he stands up to the king. The king also takes the Evil Stepmother with him. After all the action and adventure he came to realize that what really brought him happiness wasn't the promise of strength, power or wealth but was being at home with his family.

== Cast ==
- Ronalds Neilands as Malícek
- Dace Gasiuna as Lienite
- Dzintra Kletniece as Macecha

== Development ==
The film is based on the play Sprīdītis by Anna Brigadere and was a co-production between Riga Film Studio and the Czechoslovak Barrandov Studios. Per Terry Staples, the movie was one of the last films of its type to be made in the Soviet Union. Gunars Piesis documented the production process in his diary, focusing more on the pre-production process than the actual filming.

One of the songs in the film was sung by Olga Rajecka, who was brought into the film by composer Imants Kalniņš. Kalniņš, a regular contributor to Piesis's work, created eight songs for the film. Lyrics were written by Māra Zālīte, who has cited the song "Piena ceļš" as one of her most precious songs. Another of the songs, "Milk Road", achieved popularity with choirs and was performed by Uģis Brikmanis at a Latvian song and dance festival. Conductor Mārtiņš Klišāns has described the song as one of his childhood favorites.

== Release ==
Littlefinger had its world premiere in 1986 at the All-Union Film Festival at Alma-Ata in the Soviet Union. It was given a theatrical release the following year on 3 January 1987. That same year it screened at the Giffoni Film Festival in Italy and was released to Czechoslovakia. It was released in East and West Germany the following year.

The film was restored by the National Film Centre of Latvia in 2011 and in 2016, the organization made it available on their website in honor of the 85th birthday of the director. The movie was also given a screening in 2021 through the Valsts Kultūrkapitāla fonds. Anita Grīniece has described the film as one of several Latvian children's films that are commonly screened at film festivals. The film was given a release in the United States in April 2025 as a joint presentation by the Latvian State Archive & Authors Society and Eternal Family.

The movie is also held in the archives of the Latvian Film Museum, which holds screenings of the director's work in their cinema.

== Reception ==
Dace Čaure reviewed Littlefinger for Kino Raksti, writing that he was unable to view the film as favorably as he did when he was a child and noting that the film contained many viewpoints from the Soviet Union era. Viktors Hausmanis noted that Littlefinger contained Latvian ethics and moral values, which he felt was "important to remember in the era of practicality and commercialism".

Scholar Jānis Ozoliņš has commented that the movie was a response to Piesis's emotional and sexual repression, as the director faced many issues with the Soviet government system's restrictions on what was allowed within the film.

=== Awards ===
- 1986 — Ronald Neiland won an award at the All-Union Film Festival in Almaty.
- 1987 — The film won a gold medal at the Giffoni Film Festival, Italy.
- 1987 — Children's Film Festival "Fairy Tale" in Tallinn — main prize, best director and screenwriter (Gunārs Piesis), best actor (Ronalds Neilands), best actress (Dzintra Klētniece).
- 1987 — Best Children's Film at the All-Union Festival in Tbilisi.
- 1988 — Gold Medal at the International Children's and Youth Film Festival in Buenos Aires.
