= List of Latvian films before 1962 =

== 1930–1939 ==
| Year | Name | Format | Director |
|---|---|---|---|
| 1930 | Lāčplēsis | Black & white | Aleksandrs Rusteiķis |
| 1939 | Zvejnieka dēls | Black & white | Vilis Jānis Lapenieks |

== 1940–1949 ==
| Year | Name | Format | Director |
|---|---|---|---|
| 1941 | Kaugurieši | Black & white | Voldemārs Pūce |
| 1946 | Dēli | Black & white | Aleksandrs Ivanovs |
| 1947 | Mājup ar uzvaru | Black & white | Aleksandrs Ivanovs |
| 1949 | Rainis | Black & white | Jūlijs Raizmans |

== 1950–1959 ==
| Year | Name | Format | Director |
|---|---|---|---|
| 1955 | Salna pavasarī | Black & white | Pāvels Armands un Leonīds Leimanis |
| 1955 | Uz jauno krastu | Color | Leonīds Lukovs |
| 1956 | Cēloņi un sekas | Black & white | Varis Krūmiņš |
| 1956 | Pēc vētras | Black & white | Eduards Penclins un Fjodors Knorre |
| 1956 | Kā gulbji balti padebeši iet | Black & white | Pāvels Armands |
| 1957 | Nauris | Black & white | Leonīds Leimanis |
| 1957 | Rita | Black & white | Ada Armīda Neretniece |
| 1957 | Zvejnieka dēls | Black & white | Varis Krūmiņš |
| 1958 | Latviešu strēlnieka stāsts | Black & white | Pāvels Armands |
| 1958 | Svešiniece ciemā | Black & white | Ada Armīda Neretniece |
| 1959 | Šķēps un roze | Black & white | Leonīds Leimanis |
| 1959 | Atbalss | Black & white | Varis Krūmiņš |
| 1959 | Ilze | Black & white | Rolands Kalniņš |

== 1960–1961 ==
| Year | Name | Format | Director |
|---|---|---|---|
| 1960 | Tava laime | Black & white | Ada Armīda Neretniece |
| 1960 | Vētra | Black & white | Varis Krūmiņš un Rolands Kalniņš |
| 1961 | Kārkli pelēkie zied | Black & white | Gunārs Piesis |
| 1961 | Pieviltie | Black & white | Ada Armīda Neretniece, Māris Rudzītis |
| 1961 | Velna ducis | Black & white | Pāvels Armands |
| 1961 | Baltie zvani (Baltie zvaniņi) | Black & white | Ivars Kraulītis |

== See also ==
- List of Latvian films (1962–1989)
- List of Latvian films
