= Naukšēni Municipality =

Municipality of Latvia

Coordinates: 57°53′02″N 25°27′20″E

Naukšēni Municipality Naukšēnu novads
- Former municipality
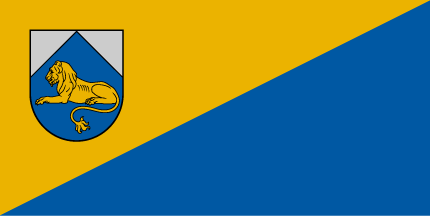
- Flag Coat of arms

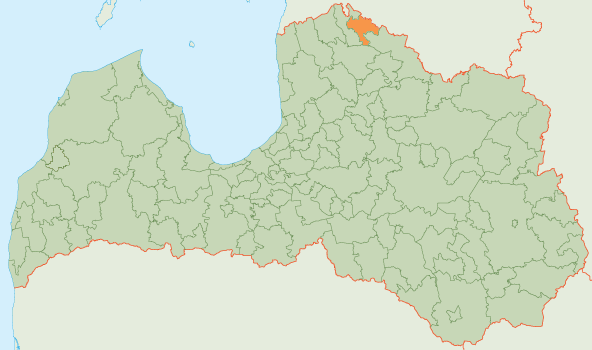
- Country: Latvia
- Formed: 2009
- Centre: Naukšēni

Government
  - Council Chair: Jānis Zuments (LZS / Sarma)

Area
  - Total: 280.69 km^{2} (108.38 sq mi)
  - Land: 275.63 km^{2} (106.42 sq mi)
  - Water: 5.06 km^{2} (1.95 sq mi)

Population (2021)
  - Total: 1,689
  - Density: 6.128/km^{2} (15.87/sq mi)
- Website: www.naukseni.lv

Naukšēni Municipality (Latvian: Naukšēnu novads) is a former municipality in Vidzeme, Latvia. The municipality was formed in 2009 by merging Naukšēni Parish and Ķoņi Parish the administrative centre being Naukšēni. As of 2020, the population was 1,675.

On 1 July 2021, Naukšēni Municipality ceased to exist and its territory was merged into Valmiera Municipality.

== Twin towns — sister cities ==
Naukšēni is twinned with:

- Borgholzhausen, Germany
- Helme, Estonia

== See also ==
- Administrative divisions of Latvia
