= Jānis Paukštello =

Latvian actor

- Born: Jānis Paukštello; March 26, 1951 (age 74); Jaunpiebalga, Latvia
- Occupation: Actor

Jānis Paukštello (born 26 March 1951) is a Latvian actor. In the theater, since the 1970s he has worked for Dailes teātris. He has also taken part in several films.

== Filmography ==
Year	Film	Role	Release date (flag: country specific)	Notes
1979	Unfinished Supper	Benny Skacke	1979	
1986	It's Easy to Fall into an Overgrown Ditch		1986	
1988	Sēklis		1988	
1991	Cilvēka bērns	Jēkabs	December 1991	
1996	Ziemassvētku jampadracis	Raimonds	November 21, 1996	
2001	Leaving by the Way		2001	
2004	Waterbomb for the Fat Tomcat	Father	March 4, 2004	
2005	Augstuma robeža		2005	
2010	Rudolf's Gold	pastor	2010	
