= A Limousine the Colour of Midsummer's Eve =

1981 film by Jānis Streičs

- Directed by: Jānis Streičs
- Written by: Māra Svīre
- Starring: Lilita Bērziņa; Olga Dreģe; Ēvalds Valters; Uldis Dumpis; Diāna Zande
- Cinematography: Harijs Kukels
- Edited by: Margarita Surdeko
- Music by: Raimonds Pauls
- Distributed by: Riga Film Studio
- Release date: 1981
- Running time: 87 min
- Country: Latvian Soviet Socialist Republic
- Languages: Latvian, Russian

A Limousine the Colour of Midsummer's Eve (Latvian: Limuzīns Jāņu nakts krāsā, Russian: Лимузин цвета белой ночи, romanized: Lymuzyn tsveta beloy nochy) is a 1981 Soviet-Latvian comedy-drama film directed by Jānis Streičs. Movie was produced by Riga Film Studio. The film was awarded the Latvian National Film Prize Lielais Kristaps in 1981. The film is part of Latvian Culture and was voted the all-time best Latvian film. It is shown every year on TV before the summer solstice festival of Jāņi, a national holiday in Latvia. The movie is about the struggle of two related families for their eighty-year-old aunt's inheritance through comic and romantic events.

== Plot ==
The movie begins when Aunt Mirta wins a lottery and is awarded a car which every Soviet citizen longs for – a Zhiguli. Because of her old age, she cannot use the car herself. When the word spreads out about her luck, different family members come to her countryside house to 'be helpful' in order to get the car after the aunt's death. Mirta's nephew Ēriks with his wife Dagnija and their son Uģis decided to give up their holiday in the Carpathian Mountains just to lay their hands on the aunt's legacy. Also, Mirta's nephew decides to surprise her with his arrival but her ex-daughter-in-law Olita together with her new family including her new husband Viktors and their offspring Lāsma. Aunt Mirta isn't a fool, she is still young in her heart until her very last breath, which also can be seen in her last will - to whom she left her car to, a Limousine The Colour Of Midsummer's Eve.

== Family members ==
- Aunt Mirta (Mirta Saknīte) — Lilita Bērziņa

=== Tūteri family ===
- Dagnija — Olga Dreģe
- Ēriks — Uldis Dumpis
- Uģis — Gundars Āboliņš

=== Sprēsliņi family ===
- Olita — Baiba Indriksone
- Viktors — Boļeslavs Ružs
- Lāsma — Diāna Zande

== Awards ==
A Limousine the Colour of Midsummer's Eve in 1981 was named as the best full-length movie that year by Latvian National Movie Festival "Lielais Kristaps".

The movie was also included into Latvian Culture Canon.

== Reconstruction ==
In 2008, the movie was restored from what it originally looked like. All the technical failures that occurred during the filming were improved, including the soundtrack of the film and colours were added where necessary. Also, more detailed information about the main heroine of the movie (Lilita Bērziņa) was included into the DVD.

== Cast ==
- Lilita Bērziņa ..... Aunt Mirta
- Olga Dreģe ..... Dagnija Tūtere
- Uldis Dumpis ..... Ēriks Tūters
- Gundars Āboliņš ..... Uģis Tūters
- Romualds Ancāns ..... Jāzeps Gilučs
- Baiba Indriksone ..... Olita Sprēsliņa
- Boļeslavs Ružs ..... Viktors Sprēsliņš
- Diāna Zande ..... Lāsma Sprēsliņa
- Ēvalds Valters ..... Pigalu Prīdis
- Līga Liepiņa ..... Veronika Giluča
