= Līga Liepiņa =

Latvian actress (born 1946)

- Born: ! August 1946; Naukšēni, Latvian SSR
- Occupation: Actress

Līga Liepiņa (born 1 August 1946) is a Latvian actress.

== Biography ==
Liepiņa was born in Naukšēni. Her father was a forest worker, her mother worked in a kindergarten. She finished school in 1964, the People's studio of the actor at the Riga Cinema studio in 1970 and the faculty of theatre at the Latvian Music Academy in 1974.

After her studies, Liepiņa was part of the group of the State Theater of the Youth from 1971 to 1976. Since 1977 she was an actress at the National Theatre of Latvia.

== Films ==
Her first film was Four White Shirts (Elpojiet dzili or Cetri balti krekli) directed by Rolands Kalniņš, from 1967. There she had the role of Bella. However, the film was forbidden by Soviet censorship. Liepiņa became famous by playing the role of Emma Karkls in the film U bogatoj gospozhi ("У богатой госпожи") by Leonīds Leimanis in 1969 after a novel by Andrejs Upīts. She had roles in more than 20 films.

Liepiņa is a part of the National Theatre of Latvia until now.

== Web sources ==
- Биография Лиги Лиепини на сайте kino-teatr.ru Biography of Liepina, in Russian
- Līga Liepiņa at IMDb
