= Four White Shirts =

1967 film by Rolands Kalniņš

- Četri Balti Krekli
- Directed by: Rolands Kalniņš
- Written by: Gunārs Priede (play)
- Produced by: Georgs Blūmentāls
- Starring: Uldis Pūcītis; Dina Kuple; Līga Liepiņa
- Cinematography: Miks Zvirbulis
- Edited by: Zigrīda Geistarte
- Music by: Imants Kalniņš
- Production company: Riga Film Studio
- Release date: 1967
- Running time: 73 minutes
- Country: Soviet Union (Latvian SSR)
- Language: Latvian

Four White Shirts (Latvian: Četri balti krekli) or Breathe Deeply (Elpojiet dziļi) is a 1967 romantic drama film directed by Rolands Kalniņš. The film was prevented from being screened by Soviet censors for 20 years following its release. In 2018, Four White Shirts was featured in the 2018 Cannes Classics program.

== Plot ==
The film centers around a telephone repairman named Cēzars Kalniņš, who writes music for his friend's rock band “Optimisti” (The Optimists). Culture worker Anita Sondore reports Kalniņš’ lyrics to the authorities due to their criticism of prevalent social values, leading to conflicts between Kalniņš, his bandmates, and the Soviet authorities.

== Cast ==
- Uldis Pūcītis as Cēzars Kalniņš
- Dina Kuple as Anita Sondore
- Līga Liepiņa as Bella
- Pauls Butkēvičs as Ralfs

== Music ==
The film's music was written by Imants Kalniņš and lyrics by the poet Māris Čaklais. The music was sung by actors Līga Liepiņa, Pauls Butkevičs, and Juris Strenga. Despite the film being informally banned for twenty years, many of the songs including “Dziesma par Napoleonu” started being played by Kalniņš’ band Menuets and became well-known hits. In 2014, music publisher ''Upe tt'' released Māris Čaklais' book ''Stikla saksofonists'' with two CDs. On the first CD, the writer reads his poetry, and the second CD includes original music from the movie. This is not only the film's first full-length movie soundtrack, but also the first music album. The tracks include:

1. Viņi dejoja vienu vasaru
2. Dziesma par krekliem. 1. variants
3. Dziesma par Napoleonu
4. Šeiks
5. Dzeguzes balss
6. Es esmu bagāts
7. Pirmā pīle
8. Dziesma par krekliem. 2. variants
9. Cik mēs viens par otru zinām

== Censorship and release ==
The film's screening was restricted by Soviet authorities for nearly twenty years after its original premiere due to its controversial stance on censorship, not becoming widely shown until 1987. In 2018, the film was digitally restored and shown at the Cannes Film Festival by director Rolands Kalniņš in the Buñuel Hall of the Festival Castle.

== Legacy ==
The film has been included into the Latvian Culture Canon as one of 99 elements in recognition of its historical and cultural value, one of just twelve films.
