= Priede =

Family name

Priede is a Latvian surname. Priede means pine in Latvian.

== People ==
- Gunārs Priede (1928–2000), Latvian playwright, engineer and architect
- Imants Priede (born 1948), British-Latvian zoologist
- Ingrīda Priede (born 1981), Latvian Paralympic athlete
- Liene Priede (born 1990), Latvian basketball player
- Rubén Priede (born 1966), Argentine cyclist
