= Māris Čaklais =

Latvian poet and writer (1940–2003)

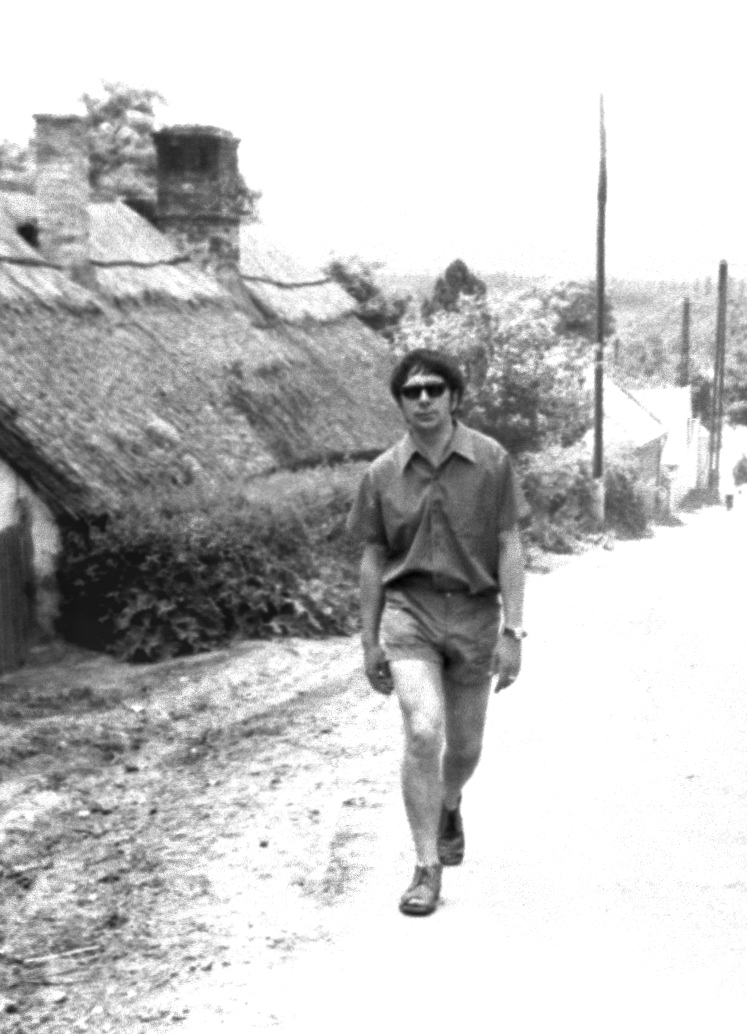
- Māris Čaklais in 1973
- Born: 16 June 1940; Saldus, Latvia
- Died: 13 December 2003 (aged 63); Rīga, Latvia
- Occupation(s): Poet, writer

Māris Čaklais (16 June 1940 – 13 December 2003) was a Latvian poet, writer, and journalist.

== Biography ==
Čaklais studied journalism at the University of Latvia until 1964; his first publications appeared in 1960. He translated to Latvian Bertolt Brecht, Paul Celan, Hans Magnus Enzensberger, and Rainer Maria Rilke, among others. He also wrote the lyrics, which were set to Imants Kalniņš' music in the movie directed by Rolands Kalniņš, Four White Shirts and Ferenc Molnár's play "Liliom".

Čaklais worked at the newspapers "Literatūra un Māksla" (Literature and Art) and "Literatūra un Māksla Latvijā” (Literature and Art in Latvia), and for the Radio Free Europe. In 2000, Čaklais was a member of the Latvian delegation to the European writers project Literature Express Europe 2000. From 2000 to 2003, he was the editor-in-chief of the literary journal Karogs.

Following re-establishing of Latvian independence in 1990, Čaklais received the Fridtjof Nansen International Award (1994), the Latvian Annual Literature Award (2000), the Order of the Three Stars (2000), and the Herder Prize (2002).

He died in Riga in 2003.

== Bibliography ==
=== Poetry ===
- Pagaidu latvietis [A Provisional Latvian]. Riga: Elpa (2002)
- Mana mājas lapa tavai mājas lapai [From My Homepage to Yours]. Riga: Jāņa Rozes apgāds (2000)
- Vientuļš riteņbraucējs [A Lonely Cyclist]. Riga: Preses nams (1997)
- Izgāja bulvārī Brīvība [The Freedom Went Out on the Boulevard]. (1994)
- Slepeni ugunskuri [Secret Bonfires]. (1992)
- Labrīt, Heraklīt! [Good Morning, Heraclitus!]. Riga: Liesma (1989)
- Mīlnieks atgriežas noziegumvietā [A Lover Returns to the Crime Scene]. (1989)
- Cilvēksauciena attālumā [At a Shouting Distance]. Riga: Liesma (1984)
- Kurzemes klade [A Notebook of Kurzeme]. Riga: Liesma (1982)
- Pulksteņu ezers [A Lake of Clocks]. Riga: Liesma (1979)
- Strautuguns [The Glitter of a Stream]. Riga: Liesma (1978)
- Cilvēks, uzarta zeme [A Man, Ploughed Land]. Riga: Liesma (1976)
- Sastrēgumstunda [The Peak Hour]. Riga: Liesma (1974)
- Zāļu diena [A Day of Flowers]. Riga: Liesma (1972)
- Lapas balss [The Voice of a Leaf]. Riga: Liesma (1969)
- Kājāmgājējs un mūžība [A Walker and the Eternity]. Riga: Liesma (1967)
- Pirmdiena [Monday]. Riga: Liesma (1965)

=== Children's books ===
- Jautrā govs, skumjā govs/ proza [A Happy Cow, a Gloomy Cow/ fiction]. Riga: Pētergailis (2002)
- Aprīļa pilieni [The Droplets of April]. Riga: Liesma (1990)
- Ķocis [The Little Old Basket]. Riga: Liesma (1984)
- Minkuparks [Kitty Park]. Riga: Liesma (1978)
- Bimm-bamm. Riga: Liesma (1973)
- Divi dzīvi zaldātiņi un citas pasakas [Two Live Soldiers and Other Tales]. Riga: Likteņstāsti (1966)

=== Other writings ===
- Profesionālis un ziedlapiņas [A Professional and Flower Petals]. Riga: Liesma (1985)
- Nozagtā gliemežnīca [The Stolen Seashell]. Riga: Liesma (1980)
- Saule rakstāmgaldā [The Sun in the Writing Desk]. Riga: Liesma (1975)
- Dzer avotu, ceļiniek [Drink from the Spring, Traveler]. Riga: Liesma (1969)
- Izaicinājums. Pirmā Latvijas Valsts prezidente Vaira Vīķe-Freiberga [A Challenge: the First Woman President of Latvia, Vaira Vīķe-Freiberga]. Riga: Pētergailis (2003)
- Gaismas kungs jeb sāga par Gunaru Birkertu [The Lord of Light or a Saga on Gunārs Birkerts]. Riga: Pētergailis (2002)
- ImKa (par komponistu Imantu Kalniņu) [about composer Imants Kalniņš, ImKa: Imants Kalniņš in Time and Space]. Riga: Jumava (1998)
- Laiks iegravē sejas [Time Engraves Faces]. Riga: Jāņa Rozes apgāds (2000)
- Dzeguzes balss (dzeja) [The Voice of a Cuckoo (poetry)]. Riga: Zvaigzne ABC (2000)
- Uzraksti uz sētas [Writing on a Fence]. Riga: Zvaigzne ABC (1999)
- Četri balti krekli (dzeja) [Four White Shirts (poetry)]. Riga: Liesma (1991)
- Uz manām trepēm (dzeja) [Come To My Stairwell (poetry)]. Riga: Liesma (1979)
- Spīdola un putnusuņi. 50 mīlas dzejoļi [Spidola and the Bird-dogs. 50 love poems]. Riga: Likteņstāsti (1977)
- Viņi dejoja vienu vasaru. Dziesmu teksti [They Danced for Only One Summer. Song lyrics]. Riga: Likteņstāsti (1966)

== Literature ==
- Rolfs Ekmanis. Harmonizer of disharmony. Latvian poet and editor Māris Čaklais. Journal of Baltic Studies. Vol 40. No. 2. June 2009. pp. 215–243, Latvian translation: jaunagaita.net
