= Culture of Latvia =

Cultural traditions and arts of Latvia

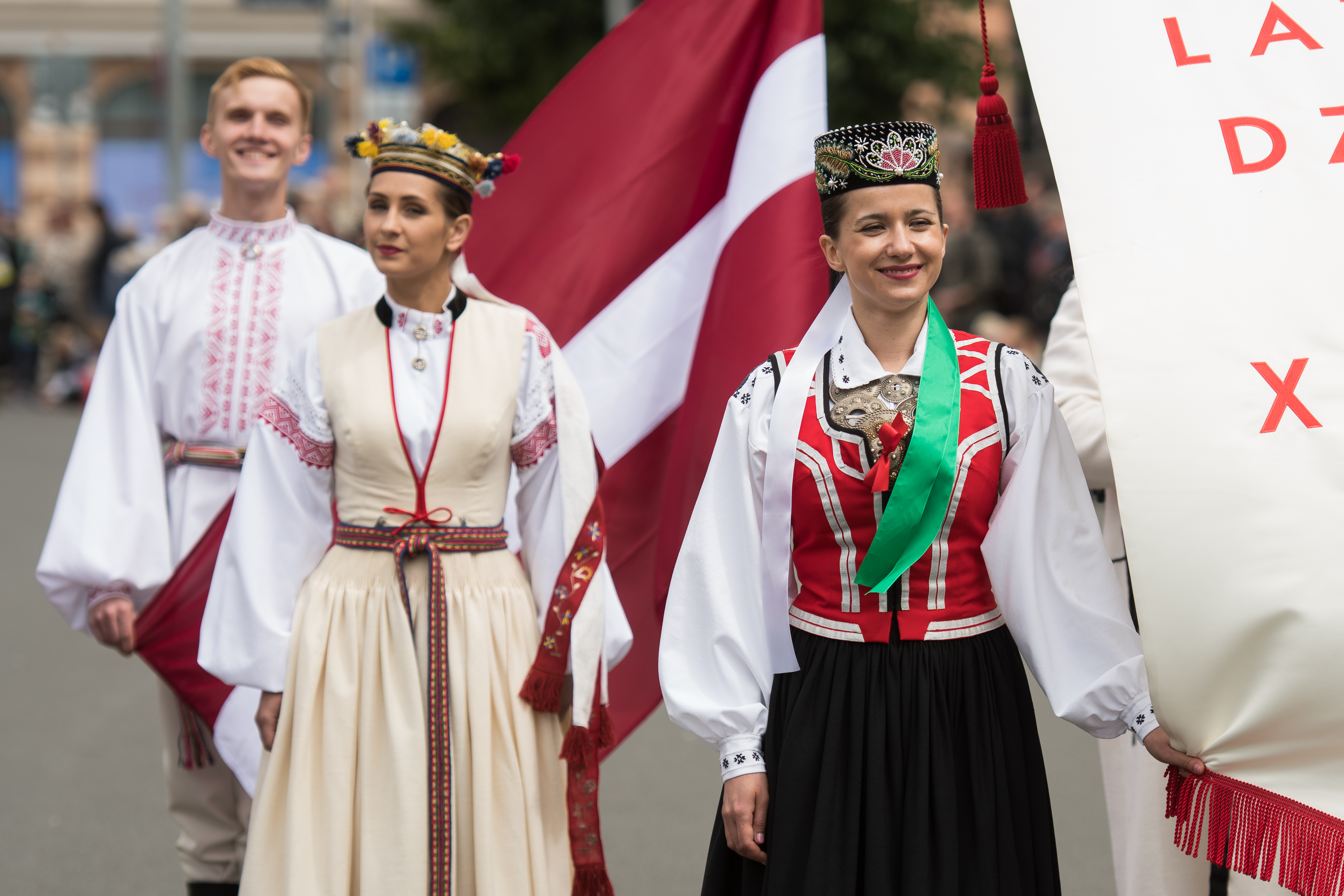
Participants in the 2018 Latvian Song and Dance Festival

The culture of Latvia encompasses the cultural traditions, languages, literature, music, performing and visual arts, architecture, film, cuisine and religious heritage associated with Latvia and its communities. Latvia's five legally recognised historical regions, Vidzeme, Latgale, Kurzeme, Zemgale and Sēlija, retain distinct traditions, language varieties and cultural environments.

Latvian is Latvia's official language. The state also protects the Latgalian written language as a historical variant of Latvian and the Livonian language as the language of Latvia's indigenous Liv population. Latvian cultural life includes folklore and seasonal traditions, the Song and Dance Celebration, Latvian-language literature and distinct regional practices. The development of modern Latvian culture has been marked by independent statehood, the Soviet and German occupations, post-war exile and restored independence.

== History ==
=== From medieval Livonia to national statehood ===
The Christianisation of medieval Livonia introduced Western ecclesiastical institutions and stone-building techniques into the territory now forming Latvia. During the Reformation, Latvian came into wider use in worship and religious writing, contributing to the development of Latvian written culture.

A secular Latvian literary tradition expanded during the Enlightenment, particularly through the work of Gotthard Friedrich Stender, and grew during the 19th century alongside education and publishing. Johann Gottfried Herder had earlier included examples of Latvian ceremonial song in his Volkslieder anthology, while Jānis Cimze's 1872 choral collection Dziesmu rota helped connect arranged folk song and choral culture with the emerging national movement. The Young Latvians sought to establish a modern Latvian high culture while adapting and contesting cultural models associated with the dominant Baltic-German elite. This process contributed to the consolidation of Latvian nationalism and the First Latvian National Awakening. The first general Latvian Song Festival in Riga in 1873, the development of Latvian theatre and the publication of Andrejs Pumpurs's epic Lāčplēsis in 1888 became important institutions and symbols of the national movement.

After the Republic of Latvia was proclaimed in 1918, Latvian-language institutions and professional networks expanded in literature, music, theatre and the visual arts. Interwar cultural life combined European modernism with national and ethnographic themes. Under the authoritarian government established in 1934, folklore imagery and representations of an ethnolinguistic nation were also incorporated into state cultural policy.

=== Occupations, exile and restored independence ===
The Soviet and German occupations during the Second World War disrupted cultural institutions and communities. After the second Soviet occupation, cultural production was reorganised within Soviet institutions and subjected to censorship and ideological control in literature, theatre, film and the visual arts. The Song and Dance Celebration continued, but its repertoire and presentation were subjected to censorship and Soviet commemorative requirements; at the same time, the event helped sustain a sense of cultural continuity and collective identity.

The flight of a large part of Latvia's population to the West in 1944 and 1945 created a broad Latvian exile culture. Refugee camps in post-war Europe developed Latvian schools, congregations, theatres, concerts, exhibitions and publishing, and later diaspora organisations maintained Latvian-language media and cultural activity in Europe, North America and Australia. In Baltic exile communities, theatre and other arts provided settings in which displaced communities could maintain cultural identity and interpret the experience of exile. Literature produced in exile developed as a distinct part of Latvian literature, addressing lost homeland, displacement, life in new countries and the relationship between cultural memory and adaptation.

During the cultural revival of the 1970s and 1980s, folklore groups, rock music, theatre, poetry and public singing provided spaces for cultural expression beyond officially promoted Soviet culture. The radio song poll Mikrofona aptauja was drawn into political mobilisation in 1988, when its winning song called for freedom for the fatherland. Twentieth-century reinterpretations of the Lāčplēsis narrative that reduced or rejected the hero's violence have been analysed as part of the cultural background to nonviolent Baltic independence activism. In the late 1980s, patriotic songs, the 1988 Baltica folklore festival, performances of the rock opera Lāčplēsis and mass demonstrations became part of the non-violent independence movement known as the Singing Revolution. Following the restoration of independence in 1991, cultural connections between Latvia and exile communities expanded, and works previously censored or published abroad re-entered Latvian cultural life.

== Regions, languages and cultural diversity ==
The Law on Historical Regions of Latvia recognises Vidzeme, Latgale, Kurzeme, Zemgale and Sēlija as historically formed areas with distinctive cultural and historical environments and shared local identities. It treats Riga as a historical part of Vidzeme while separately recognising the city's metropolitan identity, and requires the state and local governments to support the regions' cultural spaces.

Latvian is an Indo-European language in the Baltic branch and Latvia's official language; it is used across public life, education, culture and media. Its traditional dialects include the Central, Livonian and High Latvian dialects. The Latgalian written language developed from the varieties of eastern Latvia and is legally protected as a historical variant of Latvian alongside the standard literary language. Sociolinguistic studies have classified Latgalian as a regional language on the basis of its social functions and speakers' perceptions, while also noting uncertainty in Latvian state policy towards it.

Livonian is a Finnic language and the language of Latvia's indigenous Liv community. Although its everyday speaker community became very small during the 20th century, it remains in cultural and educational use and has left extensive traces in Latvian vocabulary, grammar and place names. The Official Language Law provides for its maintenance, protection and development. Baltic-German influence is visible in Latvia's historical architecture. The cultural histories of Russian Orthodox, Old Believer and Jewish communities are also visible in Latvia's religious institutions, architecture, education and urban life.

== Folklore and traditional culture ==
=== Dainas and folklore ===
Latvian folklore includes inherited oral and written forms, customary behaviour and beliefs. Its genres include folk songs, tales, legends, anecdotes, riddles, proverbs, instrumental music, dance, games and ritual practices. Folklore has served both as living community practice and as a major source for scholarship, literature, music and national symbolism.

The best-known poetic genre is the daina, usually a short, metrically structured folk-song text. Systematic collection and classification in the 19th and early 20th centuries produced the Cabinet of Folksongs, associated with folklorist Krišjānis Barons. The cabinet contains nearly 218,000 song texts on more than 350,000 handwritten slips and was entered in UNESCO's Memory of the World Register in 2001.

=== Seasonal traditions, dress and crafts ===
Jāņi, celebrated around the summer solstice, combines singing, wreath-making, the gathering of plants, special foods, bonfires, games and an overnight vigil until sunrise. The festival has remained an important public and family tradition and a symbol of Latvian identity. Other seasonal and family customs are preserved through local practice, folklore groups, museums and cultural programmes, although their forms have changed through urbanisation, migration and institutional staging.

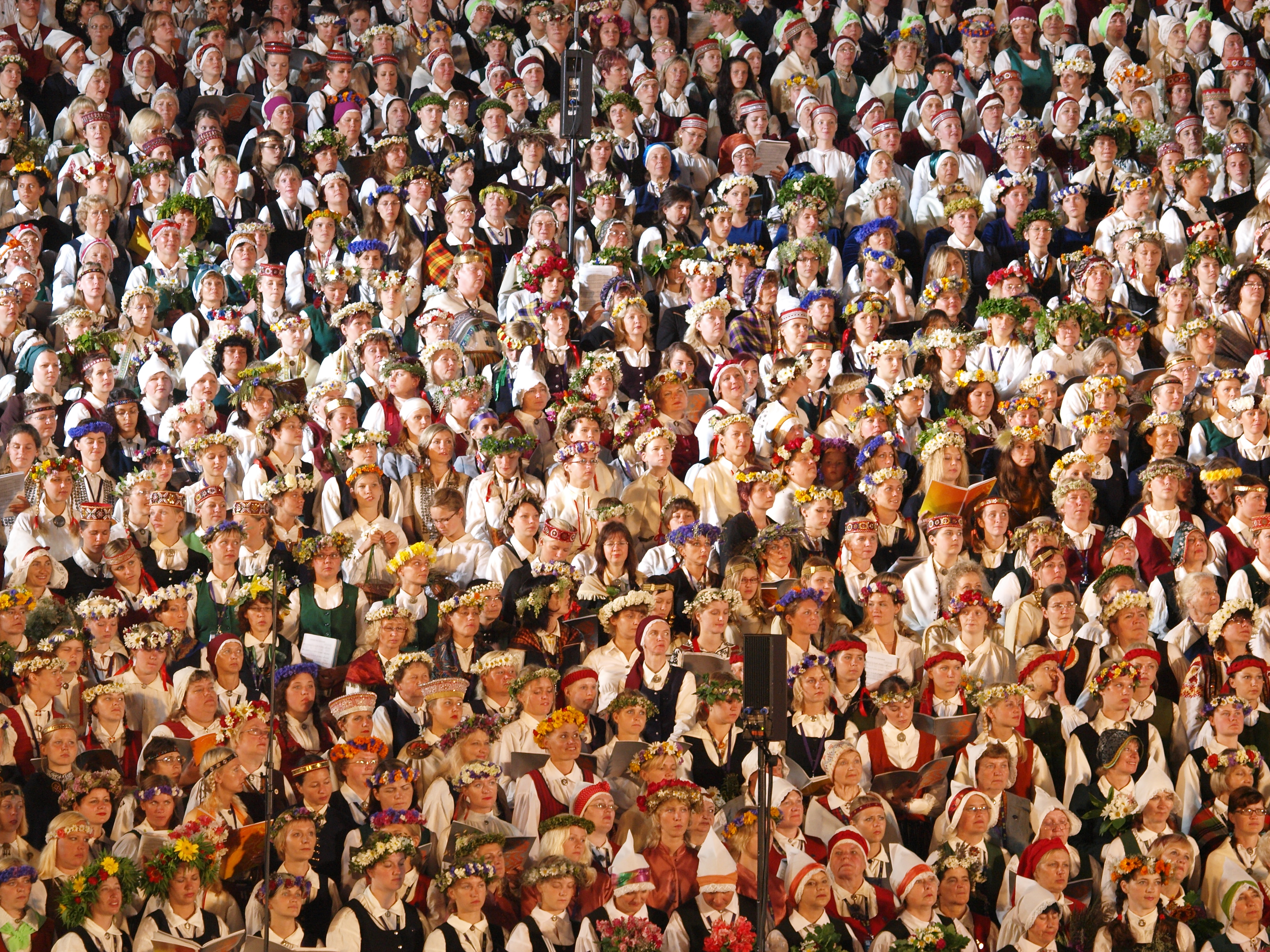
Folk costumes at the 2008 Latvian Song and Dance Festival

The modern Latvian folk costume is primarily based on regional rural festive and working dress of the 18th and 19th centuries. Its later reconstruction and public use turned regional combinations of woven garments, belts, shawls, headdresses, jewellery and embroidery into visible expressions of local and national identity. Folk applied art includes weaving, textile work, ceramics, woodwork, metalwork and other crafts that combine practical use with inherited regional aesthetics. Craft studios and exhibitions remain closely connected with the Song and Dance Celebration movement.

=== Song and Dance Celebration ===
The general Latvian Song Festival was first held in Riga in 1873. Its core practices developed around massed choirs, a procession and choral competition; staged folk dance became a major component in the Soviet period. The festival has normally followed a five-year cycle, supported by a nationwide network of amateur choirs, dance groups, wind orchestras, folklore ensembles, theatre groups and craft studios.

During Soviet rule, the celebration was ideologised and censored, but it also maintained organisational continuity and collective participation. After independence was restored, it again developed as a national cultural festival and a meeting point for groups from Latvia and the diaspora. The Latvian celebration forms part of the transnational Baltic song and dance celebrations tradition of Estonia, Latvia and Lithuania, proclaimed by UNESCO in 2003 and placed on the Representative List of the Intangible Cultural Heritage of Humanity in 2008.

== Literature ==
Latvian written literature grew from religious translation and manuscript traditions into a secular literary culture during the Enlightenment. In the 19th century, journalism, poetry, prose and drama became central to the national movement. Romantic nationalism, realism and the New Current shaped the period, while writers such as Andrejs Pumpurs, Rūdolfs Blaumanis, Rainis and Aspazija became enduring reference points in the literary canon. Pumpurs's Lāčplēsis, published during the Third General Latvian Song Festival in 1888, combined folklore and historical material and came to be treated as the Latvian equivalent of a national epic.

The independent republic supported a diversified literary and publishing environment between the world wars. After the Second World War, Latvian literature developed in two separate settings: within the Soviet literary system in Latvia and in exile communities abroad; exile writing preserved pre-war traditions while also incorporating displacement, new urban environments and wider European and North American literary influences. Exile publishers also translated a broad range of foreign literature, including authors whose works could not be published in Soviet-occupied Latvia. Since the late 1980s and the restoration of independence, works previously censored or published abroad have re-entered Latvian literary life, and contemporary literature has developed through local publishing, translation and participation in international literary networks.

== Music, theatre and dance ==
Latvian art music developed in close interaction with folk song, choral practice and music education. Choral composition and performance remain prominent through the Song and Dance Celebration, while Latvia's professional music life also includes opera, symphonic and chamber music, ballet, jazz, popular music, rock and electronic music.

Latvian-language theatre emerged from amateur societies and the first professionally organised performances in the 19th century. During the independent republic, national and regional theatres became permanent institutions; under Soviet rule, theatres worked within state structures and censorship while also developing distinctive acting and directing traditions. The contemporary theatre landscape includes state and municipal repertory theatres, independent companies, musical theatre, puppetry and site-specific work.

Dance culture includes traditional social dance, staged folk dance, ballet and contemporary dance. Staged mass choreography became a central part of the Song and Dance Celebration, while professional ballet and modern dance developed through theatre and specialised education.

== Visual arts and design ==
Professional Latvian visual art took shape in the late 19th and early 20th centuries through art education in Riga and Saint Petersburg, European modernist currents and the national movement. Landscape, portraiture, historical subjects and folklore imagery were important in the work of artists such as Vilhelms Purvītis, Janis Rozentāls and Jāzeps Grosvalds. Interwar art combined national themes with modernism, while the Soviet period brought institutional control and socialist-realist demands alongside later experiments in painting, graphics, sculpture and textile art. After 1991, Latvian artists increasingly participated in international exhibitions and contemporary-art networks.

Applied art and design have drawn on both regional craft traditions and international styles. Interwar ceramics, textiles, furniture and graphic design combined ethnographic motifs with Art Deco, functionalism and other modernist approaches. The porcelain-painting workshop Baltars, founded by Romans Suta, became a notable example of this synthesis. During the Soviet period, textile, ceramic, glass, metal and industrial design developed through state institutions, while contemporary design encompasses product, graphic, fashion, interior and digital work.

== Film ==
Public film screenings took place in the territory of Latvia from May 1896. Film production developed during the independent republic, including feature, documentary and newsreel work, and became increasingly institutionalised in the late 1930s. Under Soviet rule, the Riga Film Studio became the principal production centre. Latvian cinema of this period included popular feature films, animation and a strong documentary tradition, particularly the movement later known as Riga poetic documentary cinema.

After the restoration of independence, film production was decentralised into private studios and a new system of state support was established. Contemporary Latvian cinema includes feature films, documentaries and animation, with production, preservation and public access supported by the National Film Centre, the Riga Film Museum, film schools and the national film portal Filmas.lv.

== Architecture and cultural heritage ==
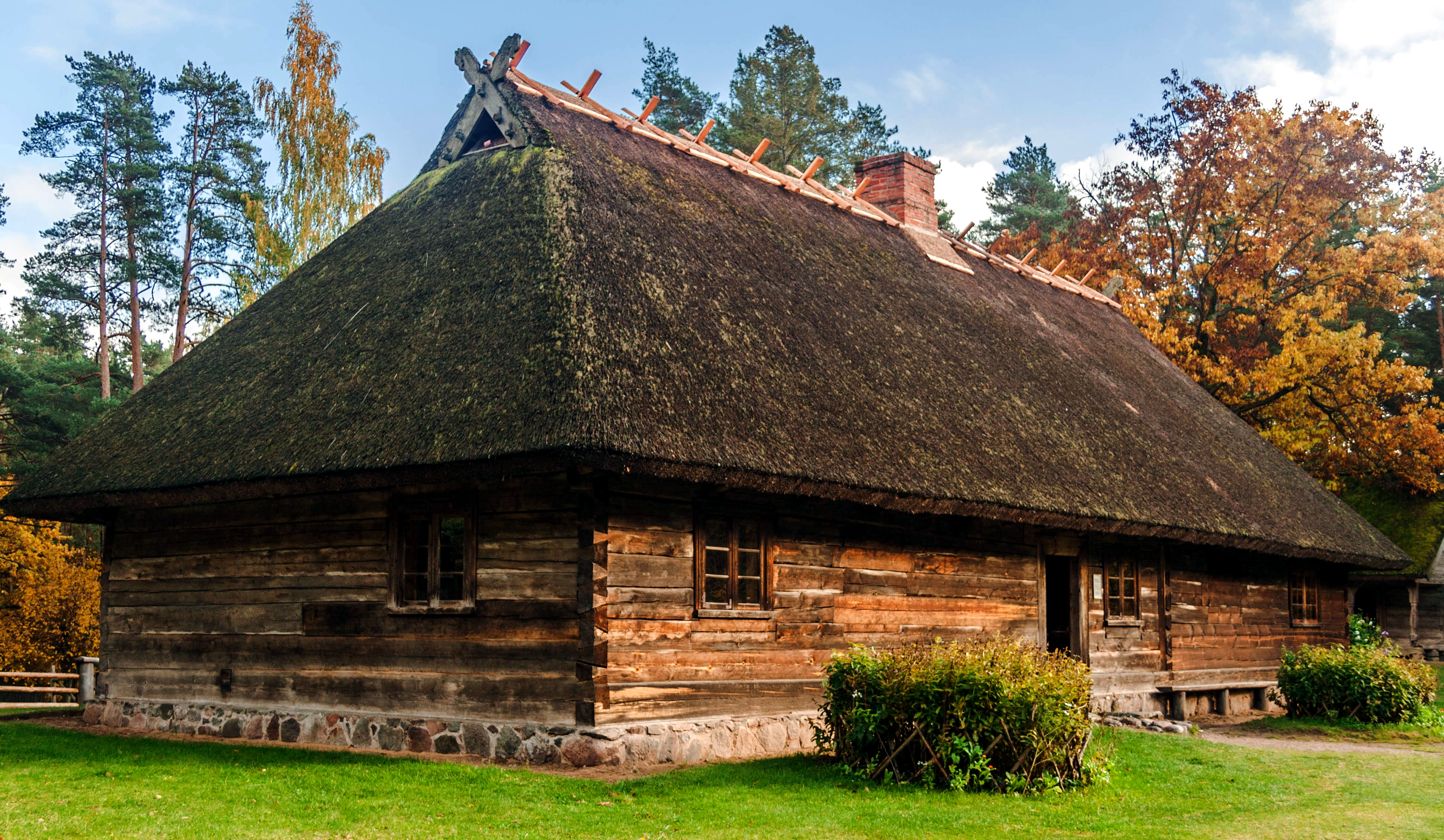
A 19th-century rural house from Rucava Parish, now at The Ethnographic Open-Air Museum of Latvia

Architecture in Latvia reflects vernacular wooden construction, medieval stone building, the urban and manorial cultures of the Baltic German era, historicism and Art Nouveau, interwar national and modernist architecture, Soviet planning and post-independence contemporary practice.

The Historic Centre of Riga was inscribed on the UNESCO World Heritage List in 1997. Its recognised heritage includes a medieval core, later boulevards, wooden urban fabric and an extensive Art Nouveau building stock. The old town of Kuldīga was inscribed in 2023 as a well-preserved example of a traditional urban settlement that developed during the Duchy of Courland and Semigallia, with historic street patterns, log architecture and layers of regional craft and trade history.

Since the restoration of independence, architectural practice has included postmodern and minimalist work, large commercial and public projects, heritage restoration and adaptive reuse. Many manors, churches and Soviet-period buildings, particularly in regions with declining populations, have nevertheless remained in poor condition.

== Cuisine ==
Traditional cuisine in Latvia developed under the conditions of a north-eastern European climate and a predominantly rural economy. Historically it relied on locally available grain, vegetables, dairy products, meat, freshwater and Baltic Sea fish, forest products and preserved foods. Rye bread, barley and oat dishes, potatoes, dairy products, pork, herring, cabbage, peas and seasonal berries became recurring elements of everyday and festive cooking.

Food traditions vary by region and have changed through urbanisation, industrial food production and international influence. Festive foods remain associated with annual customs, including caraway cheese and beer at Jāņi, while regional dishes and methods are documented and revived through museums, community events and contemporary restaurants.

== Religion and cultural traditions ==
The religious culture of Latvia has several historical layers. Eastern Christian contacts reached eastern Latvia before the medieval crusades, while Latin Christianity became institutionally established in Livonia from the late 12th and 13th centuries. The Reformation established Lutheran institutions across much of Livonia and encouraged Latvian-language preaching, hymnody and literacy, whereas Catholic culture remained especially influential in Latgale and the Suiti cultural space.

Russian Orthodox communities became an enduring part of urban and eastern Latvian life, and Old Believers fleeing religious persecution settled in the territory from the 17th century, particularly in Latgale and Riga. Jewish religious and communal life developed after the formation of the Duchy of Courland and Semigallia and became an important component of the cultural history of towns including Riga, Jelgava and Daugavpils. Surviving and restored synagogues, cemeteries, schools and museums preserve parts of this heritage.

Pre-Christian themes and folk-religious motifs remain visible in folklore, literature, seasonal customs and modern identity movements. Dievturība, however, is not an uninterrupted survival of ancient Baltic religion; it is a modern religious and nationalist movement created in Latvia during the 1920s and 1930s from interpretations of folklore, mythology and historical material.

== Sport ==
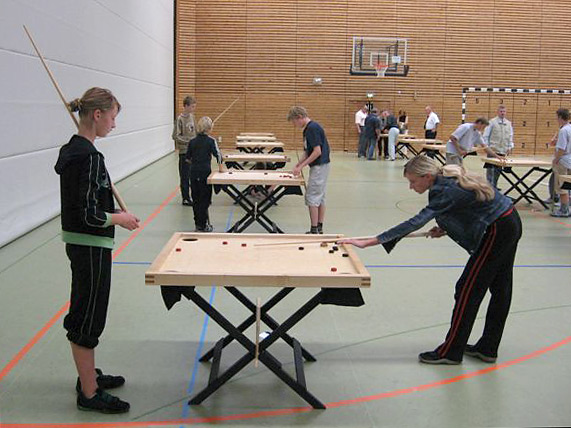
Novuss at the 2006 Baltic Children's Olympics in Cologne

Ice hockey is one of Latvia's most popular sports, and games of the men's national team attract the country's largest sporting audiences. After the team won bronze at the 2023 IIHF World Championship, the Saeima declared the following day a public holiday.

Novuss is a cue-based table sport that has been played in Latvia since about 1927. Its precise origins are uncertain, and the Latvian Novuss Federation describes Latvian novuss and Estonian koroona as sharing a common origin. The earliest surviving rules date from 1932, and the game is regarded in Latvia as a national sport.

== Cultural institutions and policy ==
Cultural institutions in Latvia are established by the state, local governments and private bodies. Their legal functions include creating, preserving, researching and making cultural values accessible; organising events and cultural education; supporting cultural activities; and providing opportunities for public creative participation in amateur and folk art.

Municipal culture centres have a specific role in local cultural life. Their statutory functions include organising cultural and educational events, supporting the continuity of the Song and Dance Celebration process, maintaining amateur-art groups, providing access to professional art and preserving local identity and intangible heritage. The national cultural-policy guidelines approved in 2022 for the period to 2027 prioritised access to cultural services, public participation, cultural education, sustainable cultural and creative sectors, and the preservation and use of heritage.

== Latvian Cultural Canon ==
The Latvian Cultural Canon is a state-initiated selection of works, people, traditions, events and landscapes presented as reference points of Latvian culture. Work began in late 2007 on the initiative of culture minister Helēna Demakova, and the original selection was completed in March 2009 with 99 entries across architecture and design, film, literature, music, performing arts, traditional culture and visual arts. A landscape section with eight entries was added in 2021; as of 2026, the official website listed 108 entries across eight fields.

== See also ==
- Latvian mythology
- List of museums in Latvia
- List of libraries in Latvia
- List of World Heritage Sites in Latvia
