= Ada Neretniece =

Latvian film director

- in 2003
- Born: 2 June 1924; Saint Petersburg
- Died: 29 December 2008 (aged 84); Riga
- Known for: Latvian films

Amida "Ada" Neretniece (1924-2008) was a Soviet Latvian film director.

== Life ==
Neretniece's father was a Latvian rifleman and Soviet commissar and her mother was an accountant. She worked with Sergei Eisenstein. When she graduated from Leningrad Secondary School No. 24 the school was evacuated and was in Kirov. In 1949 she completed her course at the All-State Institute of Cinematography. She worked at the Riga Film Studio from 1949 (making documentary until 1954).

Her first feature film she directed was "Rita" in 1957. The film took the 1959 award for directing at the Baltic and Belarusian Film Festival in Vilnius and a prize at the All-Union Film Festival in Kiev.

In 1966 she was directing spy films with a heavy bias towards a Soviet version of the Second World War.

In 1988 she was voted best director at the Lielais Kristaps film festival in Latvia for her film Zīlēšana uz jēra lāpstiņas (The Divination of the Lamb). In 1989 she directed the film "Stranger in the Village.

In 2003 Kin Lats created a montage of her films with an interview to honour her work titled DOMINANTE. Kinorežisore Ada Neretniece. She directed the film De Granchan family secrets is 1992 . It wasa Latvian film based on Honoré de Balzac's play "The Stepmother". The film was a co-production of the Latvian film studio AL KO and the Russian creative association Ekran.

Ada died in 2008 in Riga.

== Films ==
- 1957 - " Rita "
- 1958 - "A stranger in the village "
- 1960 - " Your Happiness "
- 1961 - " cheat "
- 1963 - " He's alive "
- 1965 - " Hippocratic Oath "
- 1966 - " " Cyclone 'begins at night "
- 1968 - " Long Day Morning "
- 1970 - " Republic of Varnu Street "
- 1972 - " Captain Jack "
- 1974 - " First Summer "
- 1976 - " Death under sail "
- 1978 - " New Year's Eve "
- 1981 - " Inquiry Found "
- 1984 - "The Last Visit "
- 1985 - "The Last Indulgence "
- 1988 - " Divination on the Lamb"
- 1991 - "The Dog Who Can Sing "
- 1992 - "The Secrets of the De Granchani Family "
