= The Devil's Servants =

1970 film by Aleksandrs Leimanis

- Latvian-language poster of the film
- Vella kalpi
- Directed by: Aleksandrs Leimanis
- Written by: Aleksandrs Leimanis; Jānis Anerauds
- Produced by: Visvaldis Saulītis; Gunārs Sops
- Starring: Lolita Cauka; Haralds Ritenbergs; Eduards Pāvuls; Olga Dreģe
- Cinematography: Mārtiņš Kleins
- Edited by: Elza Preisa
- Music by: Raimonds Pauls
- Production company: Riga Film Studio
- Distributed by: Riga Film Studio
- Release date: 1970
- Running time: 90 minutes
- Country: Latvian SSR
- Languages: Latvian, Russian

The Devil's Servants (Latvian: Vella kalpi, Russian: Слуги дьявола, romanized: Slugy dyavola) is a 1970 action comedy film produced and distributed by Riga Film Studio. It was written and directed by Aleksandrs Leimanis during the time Latvia was part of the Soviet Union. In 1972, Riga Film Studio released a sequel to this film named The Devil's Servants at the Devil's Mill (Vella kalpi Vella dzirnavās).

The film's setting is the Polish–Swedish War (1621–1625). A trio of mercenaries attempt to prevent the surrender of the city of Riga to the Swedish Army.

== Plot ==
Riga during the Polish–Swedish War (1621–1625). Swedish forces succeeded in taking the stronghold of Riga after a siege. The Commonwealth ceded Livonia north of the Daugava river, and retained only nominal control over Riga. Three young mercenaries from Courland are fighting to prevent full surrender of Riga city to the Swedish army.

== Cast ==
- Lolita Cauka as Rūta
- Haralds Ritenbergs as mercenary Andris
- Artūrs Ēķis as mercenary Pēteris
- Eduards Pāvuls as mercenary Ērmanis
- Olga Dreģe as Anna
- Elza Radziņa as Ģertrūde
- Ingrīda Andriņa as Cecīlija
- Baiba Indriksone as Lēne
- Kārlis Sebris as Luteran Pastor Samsons
- Edgars Zīle as Salderns
- Ēvalds Valters as Mayor of Rīga Eks
- Jānis Grantiņš as Daniels Rebuss
- Jānis Osis as Manteifels
- Haralds Topsis as Klāvs Angers
- Valentīns Skulme as Swedish General Svenson
- Zigrīda Stungure as Elizabete
