= Algis Matulionis =

Lithuanian actor

- Born: 9 April 1947 (age 78); Vilnius, Lithuania
- Occupation: Actor
- Years active: 1967–present

Algis Matulionis (born April 9, 1947) is a Lithuanian film and stage actor, director, former chairman of the Lithuanian Theatre Union. He has appeared in more than 30 films and television shows and has played many theatre roles.

== Biography ==
In 1967, he became an actor of Kaunas State Drama Theater. In 1972, Matulionis graduated from the faculty of acting of the Lithuanian Conservatory. He has appeared in more than 30 films and TV shows and has played many theatre roles.

After Lithuania gained independence from Soviet Union, Matulionis has continued to work in both film and theatre. In 1994, he founded the Independent Actors Theatre, and has directed television productions. He was the chairman of the Lithuanian Theatre Union from 1996 to 2011.

== Family ==
- Wife: Nina Radaitytė, actress
- Children: son Povilas and daughter Ugne

== Selected filmography ==
- 1971: Stone on Stone as Lauras
- 1982: The Longest Straw as Francis
- 1985: Dubultslazds as Gunar
- 1985: The Match Will Take Place in Any Weather as Irzhi Patochka
- 1986: Double Trap as Gunar
- 1988: The 13th Apostle as priest
- 1990: The Hostage as Britanov
- 1990: The Executioner as Waldemar, the executioner
- 1991: Genius as Uvarov, police colonel
