= Riebiņi =

Village in Preiļi Municipality, Latvia

- Village
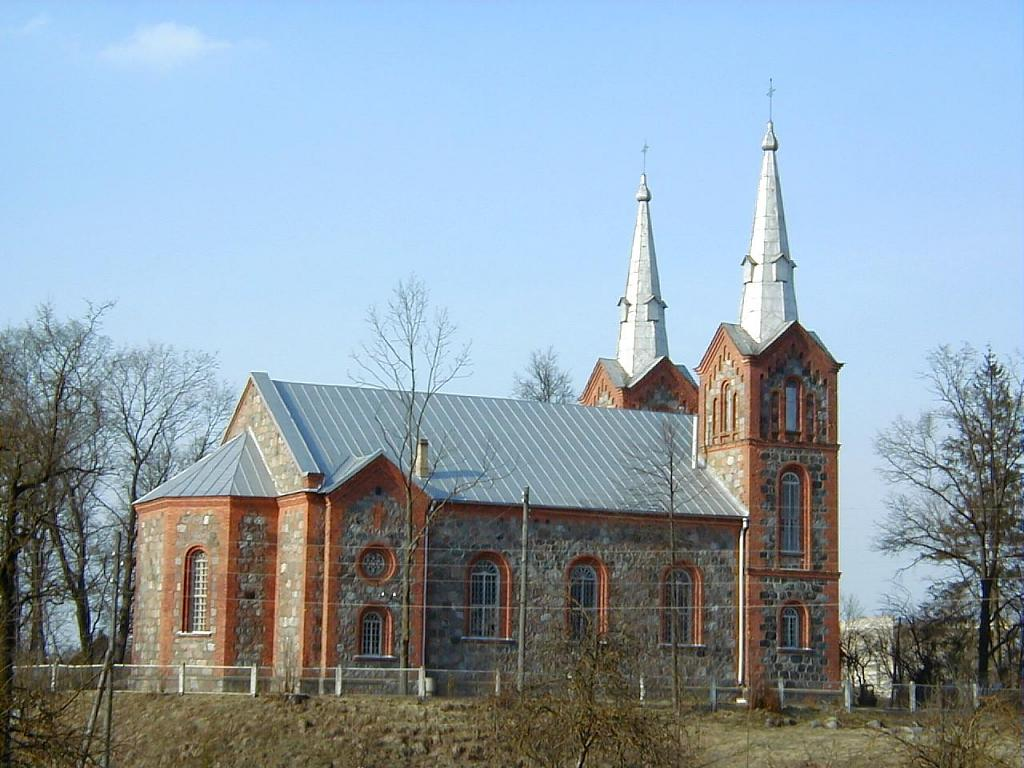
- Catholic church in Riebiņi

- Riebiņi's location in Latvia
- Coordinates: 56°20′29.06″N 26°48′4.03″E
- Country: Latvia
- Municipality: Preiļi
- Parish: Riebiņi

Population (2006)
  - Total: 951

Riebiņi (Latvian: Riebiņi, Latgalian: Ribiniški, Polish: Rybiniszki, Yiddish: Ribinishok) is a village in Riebiņi Parish, Preiļi Municipality in the Latgale region of Latvia.

== History ==
The village was a shtetl, and most of the inhabitants were Jewish. According to the census of 1897, there were 533 Jews living in the village (91% of the total population). In the beginning of the 20th century, many of the Jews left for Israel or the United States, and in 1935, Jews constituted 68% of the total population.

At the end of August 1941, Latvian civil defense police (reportedly - former members of the Aizsargi) arrested Jews and locked them into the synagogues. Then they were moved to Ribiniški Forest (4 km. northwest of the shtetl) and murdered there in a mass execution. There were some local inhabitants from Solutions district who took part in the massacre and several Germans who watched it.
