= Waterbomb for the Fat Tomcat =

2004 film by Varis Brasla

- Directed by: Varis Brasla
- Written by: Alvis Lapiņš
- Produced by: Gatis Upmalis; Artur Talvik
- Starring: Baiba Broka; Jānis Paukštello; Artūrs Skrastiņš
- Cinematography: Uldis Jancis
- Edited by: Sandra Alksne
- Music by: Imants Kalniņš
- Release date: 4 March 2004
- Country: Latvia
- Language: Latvian

Waterbomb for the Fat Tomcat (Latvian: Ūdensbumba resnajam runcim, Estonian: Veepomm paksule kõutsile) is a 2004 Latvian/Estonian Latvian language film directed by Varis Brasla, starring Baiba Broka, Jānis Paukštello, and Artūrs Skrastiņš. The screenplay is based on the teenage novel Das Mädchen, mit dem die Kinder nicht verkehren durften (1936) by German writer Irmgard Keun.

The film was awarded the Latvian National Film Prize Lielais Kristaps in 2005 as the best film of the year. In 2004 it also received award in Chicago International Children's Film Festival as the best live-action feature film or video.

== Cast ==
- Baiba Broka — Una
- Undīne Vīksne — Marta
- Zane Leimane — Linda
- Gundars Āboliņš — Ivo
- Jānis Paukštello — Grandfather
- Agita Gruntmane-Valtere — Mother
- Tõnu Kark — Dog owner
- Elmārs Viļums — Edgars
- Leonarda Kļaviņa-Ķestere — Edgars' mother
- Artūrs Skrastiņš — Father
