= Genius (1991 film) =

- Directed by: Viktor Sergeev
- Written by: Igor Ageev
- Starring: Aleksandr Abdulov; Yury Kuznetsov; Larisa Belogurova; Innokenty Smoktunovsky
- Cinematography: Sergei Sidorov
- Edited by: Lyudmila Obrazumova
- Music by: Eduard Artemyev
- Production company: Lenfilm
- Release date: 1991
- Running time: 162 minutes
- Country: USSR
- Language: Russian

Genius (Russian: Гений, romanized: Geniy) is сriminal drama with elements of satire, directed by Victor Sergeev in 1991.

== Plot ==
1991, Saint Petersburg, last days of the USSR. Director of a greengrocery Sergei Nenashev earns money not only with trade, but also with fraud. However, he acts as a kind of Robin Hood: the victims of his scams are corrupt government officials, and other, often much more dangerous crooks. Some time ago, Nenashev worked at a secret research institution where he authored a number of technical innovations to which application was not found in the conditions of the Soviet economy. However now Nenashev with his associates expertly uses these "gadgets" in fraud.

As a result of a "transaction", a batch of "Parabolic antennas", fake, of course, were sold to Azerbaijanis who trade flowers on the market. A little later, having received incriminating videos of the intimate kind featuring businessman Baev (orgy with prostitutes) and theater director Arkhipov (homosexual act with a young waiter), Nenashev starts to blackmail both of them. Attempts by the police to arrest Nenashev while he is getting the money are thwarted: each time Sergei finds an ingenious way to outwit the police.

Nenashev has a teenage daughter from his first marriage, but after the divorce, he is alone. Suddenly, at the hairdresser's Sergei meets Nastya, a very beautiful girl from a simple working family. Nastya's parents strongly disapprove of the "speculator" Nenashev's flirting with their daughter. Nastya also believes that she is just another "plaything" for the cynical rich man. However, a longer acquaintance with Sergei assures Nastya that he sincerely loves her, and then reciprocal feelings awaken in the girl.

Trouble comes from an unexpected side. Exiled for petty theft Kostya, Nenashev's assistant, finds the Azerbaijanis with fake antennas and their benefactor - powerful mafioso "Prince" Gilya. "Prince", wanting to punish Nenashev who deceived him, orders him to pay a huge sum of money, taking Sergei's daughter hostage. Having sold all the property and taking money in debt, Nenashev collects the required amount, but "Prince" requires a new redemption, this time in a foreign currency. So without letting go of Nenashev's daughter, mafia takes Nastya as hostage too.

Realizing that he alone can not do anything, Nenashev refers to the police, which has been on the hunt of the "Prince" for a long time. Employees of the department for combating organized crime agree to help Nenashev, but in return he must produce a written statement describing all the occurrences of his fraud. Sergei personally writes it, receives the dollars from the police and goes to meet the "Prince". During the transfer of money a special police unit storms the suburban cottage of the mafioso. The "Prince" is arrested; his chief henchman "Mormon" and Kostya who betrayed Nenashev die in the shootout.

Nastya and Nenashev's daughter are released, and Sergei wants to take them home. However, Major Kuzmin has Nenashev's confession and is ready to arrest him but... in response he receives the latest "trick" of the genius swindler. The pen Sergei wrote his confession with contained disappearing ink, and the stunned Major realizes he is holding a blank sheet of paper.

== Cast ==
- Aleksandr Abdulov as Sergei Vladimirovich Nenashev, "Daddy"
- Larisa Belogurova as Nastya Smirnova
- Yury Kuznetsov as Andrey Sergeevich Kuzmin, police major
- Innokenty Smoktunovsky as Mafia leader Gilya
- Viktor Ilichyov as Makar, Nenashev's henchman
- Sergei Prokhanov as Kostya, Nenashev's henchman
- Anatoly Kuznetsov as Valentin Smirnov, Nastya's dad
- Valentina Talyzina as Lubov Smirnova, Nastya's mom
- Victor Kostetskiy as Ivan Vazhin, police major
- Algis Matulionis as Uvarov, police colonel
- Anastasiya Melnikova as policewoman
- Boris Klyuyev as Aleksandr Aleksandrovich Arkhipov, director of theater
- Viktor Smirnov as Aleksei Nikolaevich Baev, businessman
- Tamara Shempel as Baev's wife
- Lev Lemke as Prof. Nathanson
- Gabriel Vorobyov as waiter
- Alina Mikhalova as Natasha, Nenashev's daughter

== Awards ==
At the 1992 Kinotavr film festival, screenwriter Igor Ageev received a special jury prize for his work on the film.
