= Cilvēka bērns =

1991 Latvian film by Jānis Streičs

- Directed by: Jānis Streičs
- Written by: Jānis Klīdzējs (novel)
- Produced by: Rolands Kalniņš
- Starring: Akvelīna Līvmane, Jānis Paukštello
- Cinematography: Harijs Kukels
- Distributed by: Rīgas kinostudija
- Release date: December 1991
- Country: Latvia
- Language: Latvian (Latgalian)

Cilvēka bērns ('Child of Man' in Latvian, Latgalian: Cylvāka bārns) is a 1991 Latvian film directed by Jānis Streičs, starring Akvelīna Līvmane, Jānis Paukštello, and others. It is the first motion picture in Latgalian. The film was selected as the Latvian entry for the Best Foreign Language Film at the 65th Academy Awards, but was not accepted as a nominee.

The story follows the 1956 novel of the same name by Jānis Klīdzējs, depicting the life of 7-year-old Bonifācijs 'Boņuks' Pāvulāns in a countryside homestead in Latgale, Latvia in the 1920s. It is mostly based on the childhood memories of Klīdzējs himself.

The film was awarded the Latvian National Film Prize Lielais Kristaps in 1991 for the best film of the year. In 1994, along with Karakum, it received the "Rights of the Child Award" in the Chicago International Children's Film Festival.

== Cast ==
- Akvelīna Līvmane ..... Mother
- Jānis Paukštello ..... Father
- Boļeslavs Ružs ..... Grandfather Izidors
- Andrejs Rudzinskis ..... Bonifācijs 'Boņuks' Pāvulāns
- Signe Dundure ..... Brigita/Bigī
- Mārtiņš Dančausks ..... Pēteris
- Agnese Latovska ..... Paulīne
- Romualds Ancāns ..... Musician at the wedding
- Uva Segliņa ..... Malvīne

== See also ==
- List of submissions to the 65th Academy Awards for Best Foreign Language Film
- List of Latvian submissions for the Academy Award for Best Foreign Language Film
