= Double Trap (film) =

- Poster
- Directed by: Aloizs Brenčs
- Written by: Vladimir Kuznetsov
- Starring: Algis Matulionis; Lilita Ozoliņa; Juris Lejaskalns
- Cinematography: Gvido Skulte
- Edited by: S. Shkila
- Music by: Raimonds Pauls
- Production company: Riga Film Studio
- Release date: January 1986
- Running time: 139 minutes
- Country: Soviet Union
- Languages: Russian; Latvian

Double Trap (Russian: Двойной капкан, romanized: Dvoynoy kapkan; Latvian: Dubultslazds) is a 1986 Soviet crime film directed by Aloizs Brenčs about a group of criminals in Riga.

== Plot ==
Set in the Latvian SSR during the early 1980s, the story centers on a criminal enterprise in Riga run by store manager Imant Blumberg and bar administrator Egon Adamson. This organization thrives on smuggling, black-market trading, and currency manipulation, dealing in rare items like video cassettes, antiques, and foreign magazines. Blumberg, the gang’s founder, keeps a low profile, while Adamson flaunts his wealth, turning his bar and mansion into both party venues and operation hubs. Connections with foreign sailors through Riga’s port allow them to access Western goods, and they establish a steady clientele among local youth. Adamson, with support from violent enforcers like “Photographer” Grabovsky, maintains a luxurious lifestyle while Blumberg liaises with Western suppliers, particularly businessman Michael Brook and the shadowy Wotan. Wotan, suggested to be a foreign intelligence operative, emphasizes spreading Western influence as much as conducting business, an ideological concern for Soviet authorities. Despite their criminal activities, Adamson and Blumberg enjoy a comfortable relationship with local officials, confidently navigating Riga’s underworld while remaining untouchable.

However, the KGB, increasingly concerned about Western influence on Soviet youth, begins monitoring the gang’s ideological impact. Aided by young investigator Vitols, the authorities collect evidence against Blumberg, but the case unravels when Adamson’s team murders a key witness. To maintain the investigation’s momentum, the KGB and police, led by Colonel Pumpur and Colonel Janson, orchestrate a joint sting operation. Blumberg, cut off from the operation by Adamson and cheated out of his share, turns to a feared crime boss, who sends an enforcer named Gunner (the “Queen”) to collect his debts. Unbeknownst to the criminals, Gunner is an undercover agent working with the authorities to dismantle the network. Through strategic moves, he gathers critical evidence, outmaneuvering Adamson, while the KGB and police set a trap. During a final high-stakes transaction, police and customs agents apprehend Brook and Wotan, and a raid pins Adamson’s gang in hiding. Gunner is praised by the KGB for his undercover work, revealing his double role as he closes out his mission, symbolically visiting a woman named Eva as a final act of reintegration into civilian life.

== Release ==
Double Trap was released in the Soviet Union in January 1986. It was the highest-grossing film in the Soviet Union for 1986, with 42.9 million tickets sold.
