= Naukšēni =

Village in Latvia

- Village
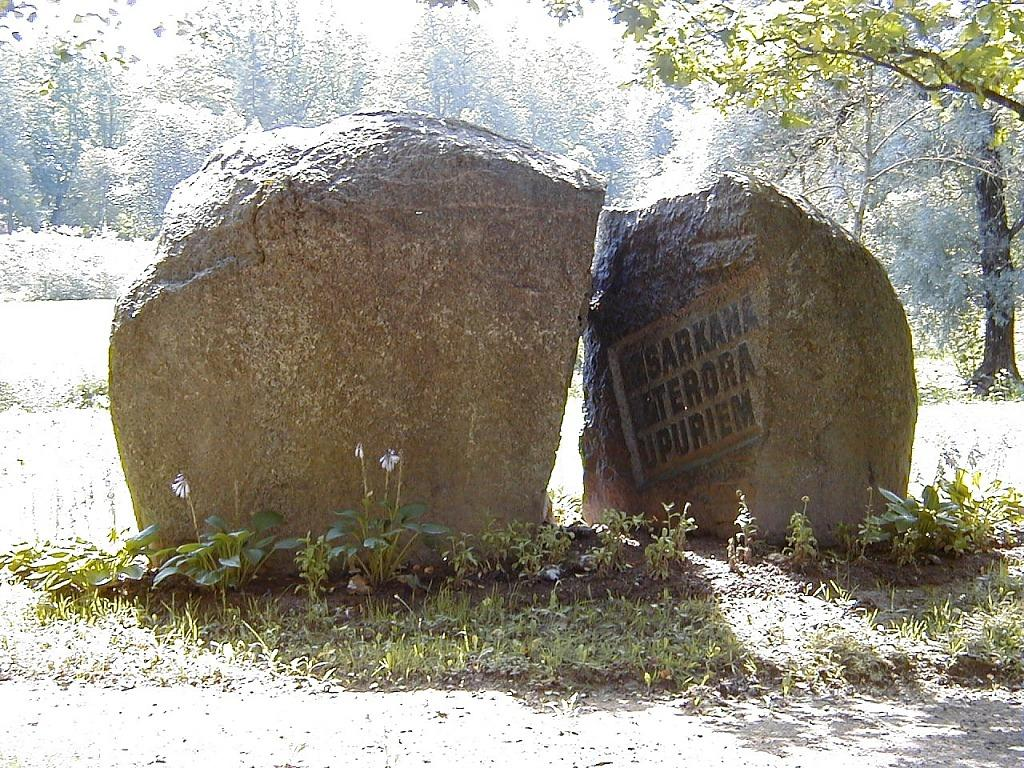
- Memorial to the victims of persecution and repression during the Soviet occupation in Naukšēni

- Naukšēni's location in Latvia
- Coordinates: 57°53′1″N 25°27′10″E
- Country: Latvia
- Municipality: Valmiera
- Parish: Naukšēni

Population (2006)
  - Total: 869

Naukšēni (Estonian: Nausküla) is a village in the Naukšēni Parish of Valmiera Municipality in the Vidzeme region of Latvia. It is the centre of Naukšēni Parish.
