= Sniedze Prauliņa =

- Born: 28 August 1991 (age 33)
- Origin: Latvia

Sniedze Prauliņa (born 28 August 1991) is a Latvian musician, multi-instrumentalist, and composer. She has worked as a solo artist and in the group Juuk.

== Biography ==
Prauliņa was born into a musical family: her father is composer and musician Uģis Prauliņš, and her mother is composer, organist and singer, Silvija Silava.

Prauliņa sang in the vocal ensemble Anima Solla and in the choirs Ave Sol and Mūza. In 2014, she released the album INTRO together with the choir Mūza. Prauliņa gained wider recognition in 2015 with participation in the second season of Latvia Television's young academic musicians show Radīti muzikai.

She released her first solo album, Inkrustācija, in April 2017. The album was nominated for the 2017 Austras award.

In 2018, Prauliņa composed a song performed by Evija Vēbere for Andra Gauja's film Nekas mūs neapturēs.

She released her second album in 2021 as part of the group Juuk, titled Sikspārņi.

== Discography ==
- INTRO (2014, LP) with Mūza choir
- Inkrustācija (2017, LP, Biedrība HI)
- Indulgenču tirgotāji (2019, LP, Biedrība HI) with the group Juuk
- Sikspārņi (2021, LP, Biedrība HI) with the group Juuk
