= Gunārs Priede =

Latvian playwright, engineer and architect

- Born: March 17, 1928 Riga, Latvia
- Died: December 22, 2000 (aged 72) Riga, Latvia
- Occupation: Playwright
- Language: Latvian
- Education: Latvian State University

Gunārs Priede (March 17, 1928 – December 22, 2000) was a Soviet and Latvian writer and playwright. He was originally a civil engineer for the Soviet government in Latvia who became the most important Latvian playwright of the Soviet era. He penned numerous dramas and comedies with lyrical, metaphorical and realist qualities, reflecting social conditions in Latvia at the time.

He was appointed Writers' Union of Drama Consultant (1958 - 1960), to Riga Film Studio (1960 - 1964), the Ministry of Culture (1964 - 1965), the Latvian Filmmakers Union Board as secretary (1965 - 1968), secretary of the Writers’ Union (1972 - 1974), secretary the Writers' Union Board (1974 - 1984), the Lenin and USSR State Prize Committee (1975 - 1989), and the Latvian Brethren Cemetery Committee (1989). He was awarded with the Order of the Three Stars (IV class).

== Plays ==
- Jaunākā brāļa vasara (1955)
- Lai arī rudens (1956)
- Normunda meitene (1958)
- Vikas pirmā balle (1960)
- Miks un Dzilna (1963)
- Tava labā slava (1965)
- Pa valzivju ceļu (1965)
- Trīspadsmitā (1966)
- Smaržo sēnes (1967)
- Otīlija un viņas bērnubērni (1971)
- Ugunskurs lejā pie stacijas (1972)
- Žagatas dziesma (1978)
- Vai mēs viņu pazīsim? (1980)
- Mācību trauksme (1980)
- Saniknotā slieka (1983)
- Filiāle (1983)
- Centrifūga (1985)
- Sniegotie kalni (1986)
