= Varis Brasla =

Latvian film director

- Born: Varis Brasla; 25 April 1939 (age 87); Riga, Latvia
- Occupation: Film director
- Years active: 1962 –

Varis Brasla (born 25 April 1939) is a Latvian film director.

Since 1965 he worked in Riga Film Studio. Several of his films, including Emil's Mischiefs and Waterbomb for the Fat Tomcat were awarded with the Latvian National Film Prize award as the best film of the year.

He was awarded the Order of Three Stars in 2009.

== Selected filmography ==
=== Director filmography ===
Year	Film	Notes
1976	The Lake Sonata	
1978	Pavasara ceļazīmes	
1980	Novēli man lidojumam nelabvēlīgu laiku	Latvian National Film Prize in 1980
1982	Tereona galva	
1983	Parāds mīlestībā	
1985	Emil's Mischiefs	Latvian National Film Prize in 1985
1987	Aija	
1988	Par mīlestību pašreiz nerunāsim	Latvian National Film Prize in 1988
1991	The Times of the Land-Surveyors	
1996	Ziemassvētku jampadracis	
1996	Kā tev klājas, Eidi?	also screenwriter
2004	Waterbomb for the Fat Tomcat	Latvian National Film Prize in 2005
2017	Grandpa More Dangerous Than Computer	

Other:

- Brick Kiln (1972) (second unit director)
- In the Shadow of Death (1971) (assistant director)
- Four White Shirts/Breathe Deeply (1967) (second unit director)
