= Oļģerts Dunkers =

Latvian film director

- Born: 11 February 1932; Riga, Latvia
- Died: 9 October 1997 (aged 65)
- Occupations: Actor, film director
- Years active: 1966 - 1995

Oļģerts Dunkers (11 February 1932 in Riga – 10 September 1997) was a Latvian actor and film director and politician. He was elected to 6th Saeima (Latvian Parliament) in 1995.
