= Evita Ašeradena =

Latvian writer

- Language: Latvian
- Spouse: Arvils Ašeradens

Evita Ašeradena (born Evita Sniedze 6 August 1974 in Madona) is a Latvian playwright, theatre scholar, and director of the Valmiera drama Theatre.

== Career ==
She was awarded the special award of the “Spēlmaņu nakts” jury in 2004. The performance of her play “Kreisais pagrieziens” at Dailes Theatre was recognised as the best performance of Latvian literature of the year 2004. She won the AKKA/LAA Infinity award (2005).

== Plays ==
- "Tikai dzīvojam..." (1999)
- "Smilšu kaste" (2000)
- "Tie paši oši" (2001)
- "Leģenda par lauru koku" (2001)
- "Vilku ceļš" (2002)
- "Kreisais pagrieziens" (2003)
- "Līdz pavasarim" (2008)
- "Mākoņains, iespējams skaidrosies" (2011)
