= Emil's Mischiefs =

1985 film by Varis Brasla

- Directed by: Varis Brasla
- Written by: Alvis Lapiņš (writer); Astrid Lindgren (novel "Än lever Emil i Lönneberga")
- Starring: Māris Zonnenbergs-Zambergs; Madara Dišlere; Dace Eversa; Uldis Dumpis; Diāna Zande
- Cinematography: Dāvis Sīmanis
- Edited by: Signe Šķila
- Music by: Imants Kalniņš
- Distributed by: Riga Film Studio
- Release date: 1985
- Running time: 67 minutes
- Country: Soviet Union
- Languages: Latvian, Russian

Emil's Mischiefs (Latvian: Emīla nedarbi) is a 1985 Soviet-era Latvian TV-film about the Astrid Lindgren character, Emil i Lönneberga. It was produced by Riga Film Studio.

The film was awarded the Latvian National Film Prize Lielais Kristaps in 1985.

== Plot ==
Young Emil lives with his parents and younger sister on a small farm. In his parents' eyes, he is a terrible troublemaker, and his father has started to dread Emil's next mischievous idea, keeping him away from important tasks whenever possible.

Emil's past escapades include breaking a soup tureen, accidentally trapping his father's finger in a rat trap, a botched attempt to pull out the maid Lina's tooth, and shattering Frau Petrell's dining room window. Despite his mischief, it is Emil's bold spirit that enables him to outsmart the greedy, harsh matron of the local shelter. On his birthday, he even manages to organize a lively celebration for the elderly residents, bringing them joy and laughter.
