= Dailes Theatre =

Theatre in Riga, Latvia

Coordinates: 56°57′17″N 24°07′27″E

Dailes Theater
- Theatre building
- Interactive map of Dailes Theater
- Address: Brīvības Street 75; Riga; Latvia
- Type: Theater

Construction
- Opened: 1977
- Years active: 1920–present
- Architect: Marta Staņa

Website
- www.dailesteatris.lv/lv/

The Dailes Theatre (Latvian: Dailes teātris) is a professional Latvian theater founded by Latvian director and actor Eduards Smiļģis (1886-1966) on November 19, 1920 at the Craftsmen Relief Society House at Lāčplēša Street 25, Riga, Latvia. Today, it is located at Brīvības Street 75, Riga, Latvia in functionalism architecture style building with three halls: large hall, small hall and chamber hall. It is typical for the theater to stage large-scale and dramatically tense performances of the form, as well as talk about significant personalities of history and culture of its time. According to the director these performances reflect the guidelines set out in the theatrical motto - clarity, simplicity, passion. The theater repertoire includes works by both Latvian and foreign authors.

== History ==
The founder and first principal director of Dailes Theater is Eduards Smiļģis. Smiļģis’ first assistants were motion consultant Felicita Ertnere (1891-1975), stage designer Jānis Muncis (1886-1955) and musical director Burhards Sosārs (1890-1953).

The theater style has always been different from that so-called natural-psychological theater style. According to the principal director Smiļģis, the theater “does not strive for a complete illusion (and the actor is not a life imitator), but, while making plays, creates a reality of art that is higher than the reality of life.”

The first year of the theater was difficult in the material sense, since everything was based only on employee enthusiasm, but the money was gradually raised and the theater gained the audience's appreciation.

The first performance of the Dailes Theater was the production of Rainis' play "Indulis and Ārija". Eduards Smiļģis chose the repertoire for theater of both the ambitious works of Latvian authors - Rainis, Aspazija, Anna Brigadere, Andrejs Upītis and other works of the world classics - plays by William Shakespeare, Friedrich Schiller, Karl Goldon, as well as dramatizing the latest generation of dramatists in Europe.

== Building and location ==
For the first 57 years, the theater's residence was at the Craftsmen Relief Society House at Lāčplēša Street 25, Riga, Latvia (today New Riga Theater is located there).

In 1959 the architect Marta Staņa (1913-1972) won a competition organized by Smiļģis and created a new building project located at Brīvības Street 75, Riga, Latvia. The Dailes Theater is one of the most significant buildings in Latvian architectural history, it is included in Latvian Cultural Canon. Theater is built in the style of functionalism architecture, making it different from other Latvian theaters.

The building is characterized by a consistent, functionally differentiated volume arrangement and spacious, interconnected rooms. The main facade of the theater forms a glassed viewer's lobby, stretching along Brīvības Street. Above it there is a theatrical logotype interpreted by the sculptor Ojārs Feldbergs (born in 1947). The lobby of the dark bricks contrasts with the bright concrete and glass surfaces on the wide front floor.

There are three halls in the Dailes Theater building:

- Large hall (up to 980 seats);
- Small hall (up to 197 seats);
- Chamber hall (up to 83 seats).

The Large hall is devoted to the widest range of performances, attracting a wide audience of viewers: dramas, comedies, tragedies, musical performances, children's shows and for concerts, whereas the Chamber hall and the Small hall are devoted to close-up psychological studies, experimental productions and quests for theater aesthetics.
