= Eduards Smiļģis =

Latvian actor and theatre director

- Born: 23 November 1886; Riga, Governorate of Livonia, Russian Empire
- Died: 19 April 1966 (aged 79); Riga, Latvian SSR, Soviet Union
- Occupations: Actor, theatre director
- Years active: 1906–1966
- Awards: People's Artist of the USSR (1948)

Eduards Smiļģis (23 November 1886 – 19 April 1966) was a Latvian and Soviet actor and theatre director. He became a People's Artist of the USSR in 1948.

Smiļģis founded the Dailes Theatre in Riga in 1920 and was its chief director until 1965. His home in Pārdaugava is now the Eduards Smiļģis Theater Museum.
