= List of World Heritage Sites in Latvia =

UNESCO sites in Latvia

World Heritage Sites in Latvia, blue dots mark the sites of the Struve Geodetic Arc

The United Nations Educational, Scientific and Cultural Organization (UNESCO) World Heritage Sites are places of importance to cultural or natural heritage as described in the UNESCO World Heritage Convention, established in 1972. Cultural heritage consists of monuments (such as architectural works, monumental sculptures, or inscriptions), groups of buildings, and sites (including archaeological sites). Natural heritage consists of natural features (physical and biological formations), geological and physiographical formations (including habitats of threatened species of animals and plants), and natural sites which are important from the point of view of science, conservation, or natural beauty.

Latvia accepted the convention on 10 January 1995, making its historical sites eligible for inclusion on the list. It has three sites on the list, all of them listed for their cultural significance. The most recent site added to the list was the Old town of Kuldīga, in 2023. The Struve Geodetic Arc is a transnational site and is shared with nine other countries. In addition, Latvia also maintains three properties on its tentative list.

== World Heritage Sites ==
UNESCO lists sites under ten criteria; each entry must meet at least one of the criteria. Criteria i through vi are cultural, and vii through x are natural.

* Transnational site

World Heritage Sites
Site	Image	Location	Year listed	UNESCO data	Description
Historic Centre of Riga	A house with a decorated facade at night	Riga	1997	852; i, ii (cultural)	Riga, founded in 1201, was a major Hanseatic city from the 13th to the 15th centuries. Not many houses remain from that period, as they were destroyed by fire or war. Later, Riga saw a rapid expansion in the 19th and early 20th century, when many Art Nouveau buildings were constructed. Riga has the highest concentration of buildings in this style in Europe. The House of the Blackheads is pictured.
Struve Geodetic Arc*	Rock with a memorial plate	Ērgļi Municipality, Jēkabpils	2005	1187, ii, iii, vi (cultural)	The Struve Geodetic Arc is a series of triangulation points, stretching over a distance of 2,820 kilometres (1,750 mi) from Hammerfest in Norway to the Black Sea. The points were set up in a survey by the astronomer Friedrich Georg Wilhelm von Struve who first accurately measured a long segment of a meridian – and along with it the size and shape of the Earth. Originally, there were 265 station points. The World Heritage Site includes 34 points in ten countries (North to South: Norway, Sweden, Finland, Russia, Estonia, Latvia, Lithuania, Belarus, Moldova, Ukraine), two of which are in Latvia (the marker at Sestu-Kalns pictured).
Old town of Kuldīga	Liepājas iela (street) in the old town of Kuldīga	Kuldīga	2023	1658; v (cultural)	The historic centre of Kuldīga is well preserved and dates from the late 16th to the 18th centuries, when the city was an administrative centre of the Duchy of Courland and Semigallia. The mixture of architectural styles reflect the cultural exchange with the countries around the Baltic Sea.

== Tentative list ==
In addition to sites inscribed on the World Heritage List, member states can maintain a list of tentative sites that they may consider for nomination. Nominations for the World Heritage List are only accepted if the site was previously listed on the tentative list. Latvia lists three properties on its tentative list.

Tentative sites
Site	Image	Location	Year listed	UNESCO criteria	Description
Meanders of the Upper Daugava	A view at a river and surroundings	Daugava river from Piedruja to Daugavpils	2011	v, viii, x (mixed)	The Upper Daugava river valley features interesting postglacial landforms that formed over 13–15 thousand years ago. The area has been inhabited for millennia and features several cultural landscape types: ritual (sacred buildings, ancient burial grounds, cemeteries, and crucifixes), social, and economic (urbanization, farmer settlements).
Grobiņa archaeological ensemble	Remains of a hillfort, covered by grass and trees	Grobiņa	2017	iii (cultural)	The Grobiņa archaeological ensemble comprises remains of the settlements and burial sites which date to the period between the 7th and the 9th centuries, when the Scandinavians started migrating overseas. Grobiņa was the settlement when they lived along the local Curonian population, which helped the cultural exchange.
Rundāle Palace Ensemble with a Garden and Forest Park	Frontal view of a large palace with a fountain in front	Rundāle Municipality	2021	i, ii, iv (cultural)	The Baroque-style palace, together with the garden and the forest park, was designed by the Italian architect Francesco Bartolomeo Rastrelli. It was built for the Dukes of Courland as a summer residence. The initial construction took place in the 1730s while the interior gained a new late Rococo style finish in the 1760s. The palace has retained the integrity of its 18th century architectural design.
