= Riebiņi Parish =

Parish of Latvia

- parish of Latvia
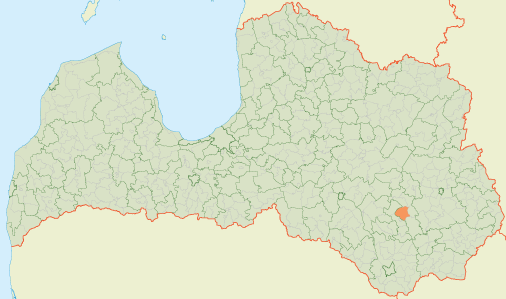
- 56°20′48″N 26°45′41″E
- Country: Latvia

Area
  - Total: 108.44 km^{2} (41.87 sq mi)
  - Land: 108.44 km^{2} (41.87 sq mi)
  - Water: 1.66 km^{2} (0.64 sq mi)

Population (1 January 2024)
  - Total: 1,080
  - Density: 10.0/km^{2} (26/sq mi)

Riebiņi Parish (Latvian: Riebiņu pagasts, Latgalian: Ribinišku pogosts) is an administrative unit of Preiļi Municipality in the Latgale region of Latvia. At the beginning of 2014, the population of the parish was 1443. The administrative center is Riebiņi village.

== Towns, villages and settlements of Riebiņi Parish ==
- Kokorīši
- Ondzuļi
- Opūgi
- Pieniņi
- Riebiņi
- Sprindži
