= Jānis Streičs =

Latvian film director (1936–2026)

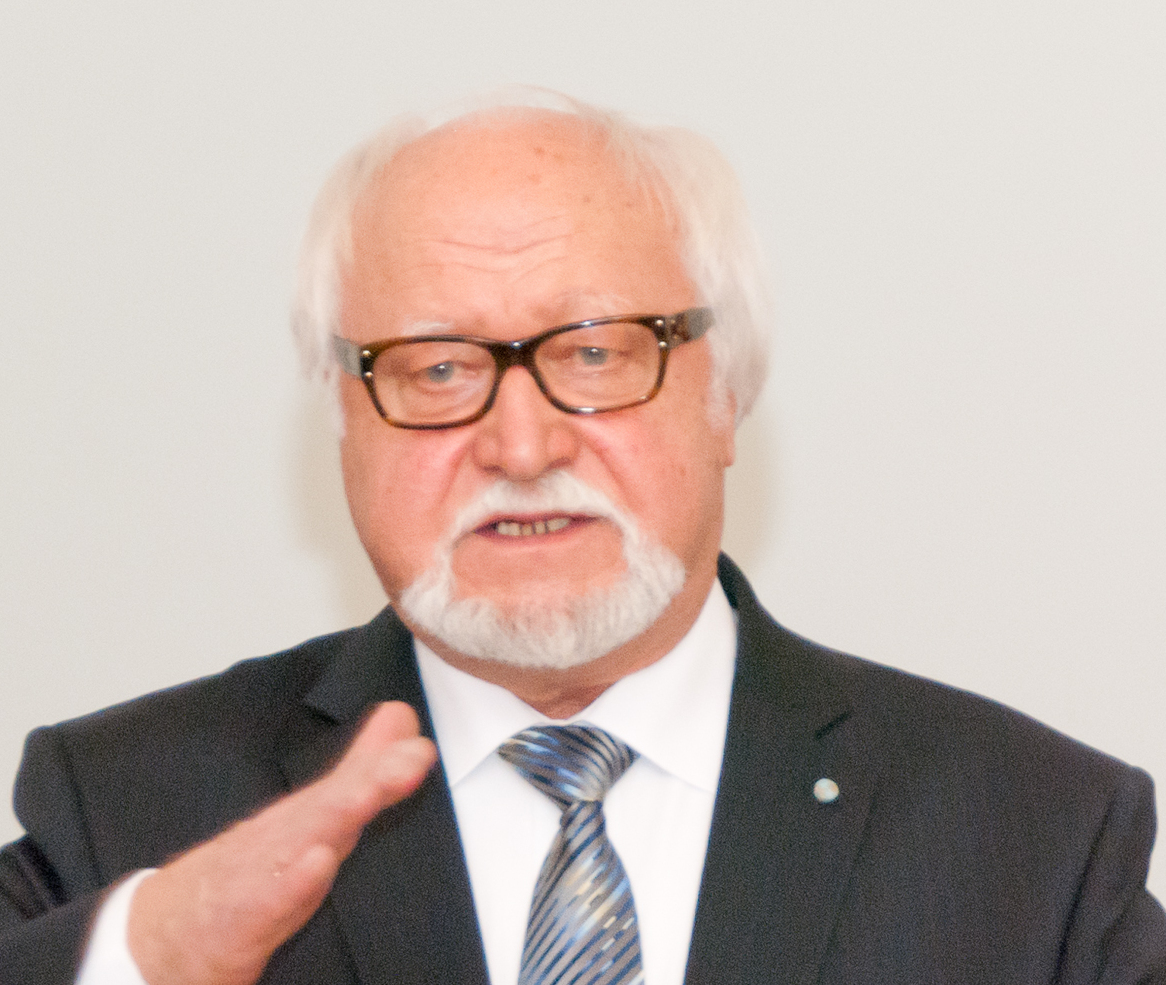
- Streičs in 2011
- Born: 26 September 1936; Preiļi, Latvia
- Died: 5 March 2026 (aged 89); Veisiejai, Lithuania
- Education: Latvian State conservatory
- Occupations: Film director, screenwriter

Jānis Streičs (26 September 1936 – 5 March 2026) was a Latvian film director and artist. His 1991 comedy film The Child of Man was runner-up for the Chicago International Children's Film Festival Rights of the Child Award in 1994. It had previously been Latvia's submission for the Academy Award for Best Foreign Language Film at the 65th Academy Awards, but did not make the shortlist.

In 1978 Theater, in 1981 A Limousine the Colour of Midsummer's Eve and in 1991 The Child of Man received the Latvian Film Prize as the best film of the year.

Streičs died in Lithuania on 5 March 2026, at the age of 89. He was buried in the Petrauski cemetery in Riebiņi parish.
