= Naukšēni Parish =

Parish of Latvia

- parish of Latvia
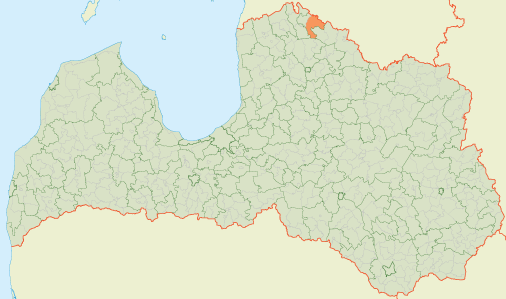
- 57°53′26″N 25°31′41″E
- Country: Latvia

Area
  - Total: 188.86 km^{2} (72.92 sq mi)
  - Land: 188.86 km^{2} (72.92 sq mi)
  - Water: 3.56 km^{2} (1.37 sq mi)

Population (1 January 2024)
  - Total: 995
  - Density: 5.3/km^{2} (14/sq mi)

Naukšēni Parish (Latvian: Naukšēnu pagasts) is an administrative unit of Valmiera Municipality in the Vidzeme region of Latvia.
