= Latvian Film Museum =

- Latvijas Kino muzejs
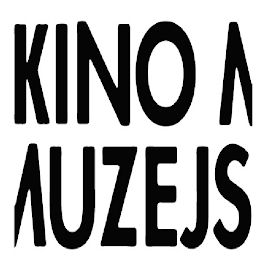

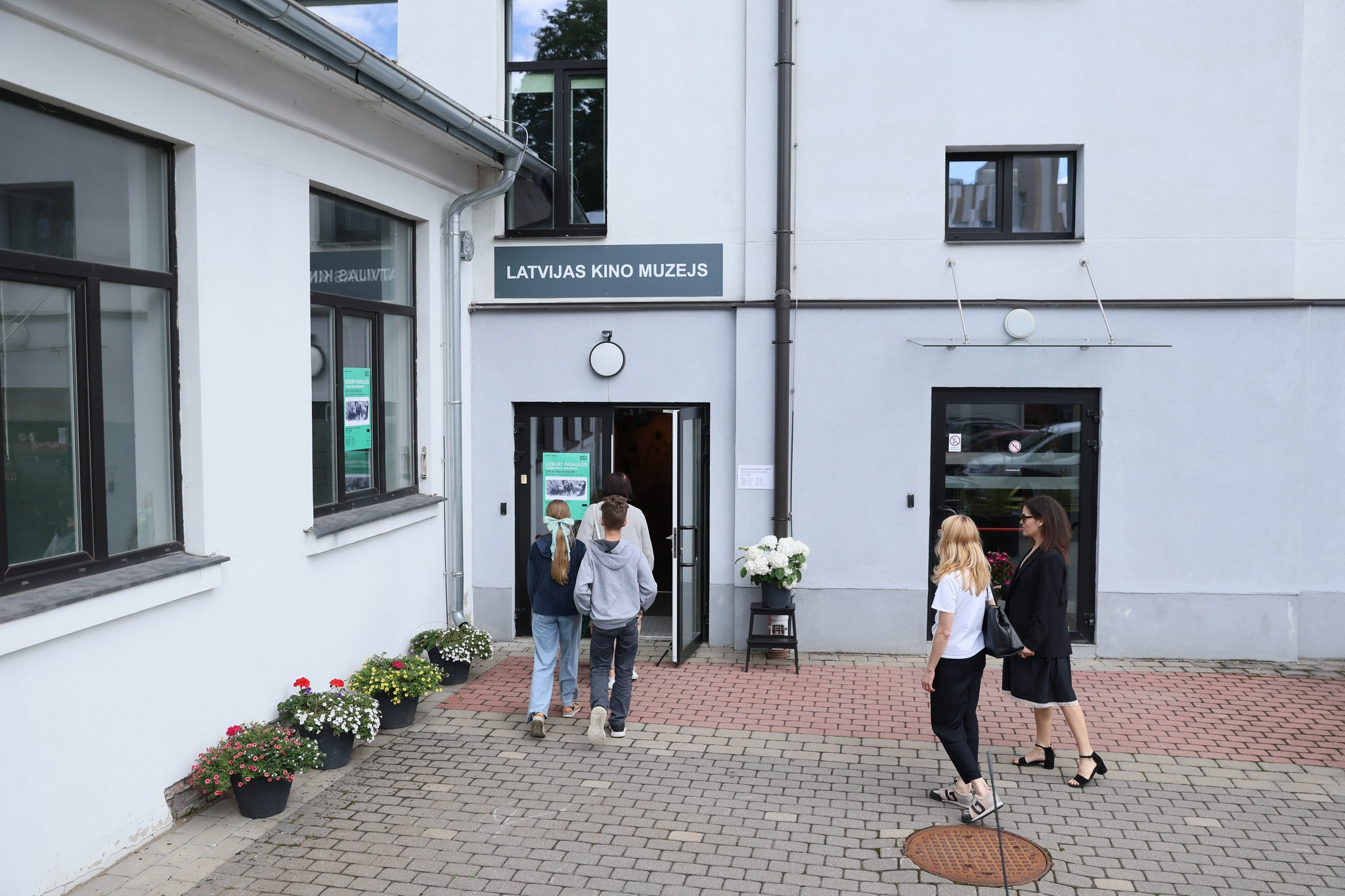
- Entrance to the Latvian Film Museum
- Established: 1988
- Location: Miera street 58a, Riga, LV-1013
- Coordinates: 56.966504°N 24.135801°E
- Type: Film museum
- Director: Inga Pērkone
- Public transit access: • Dzemdību nams 🚊 Tram 11 • Dzemdību nams 🚎 Trolleybus 5 and 25
- Website: Official website

Latvian Film Museum is the only museum of its kind in Latvia. It holds various exhibitions that display different aspects of cinema art, actors and film history. The museum was founded in 1988 and is located in Riga, Miera street 58a.

The museum has been closed for renovation since June 1, 2026. A new building for the permanent exhibition “Stories of Latvian Cinema” and a movie theater are currently under construction.

== History ==
The idea to establish the Film Museum in Riga came about during the traditional cinema forum called ”Kino Diena” (English: "Film Day") in 1986. The leaders of this project were Augusts Sukuts, Inga Pērkone-Redoviča, and Juris Civjans. They managed to start a museum by getting a permission from the Soviet Union cinema organization.

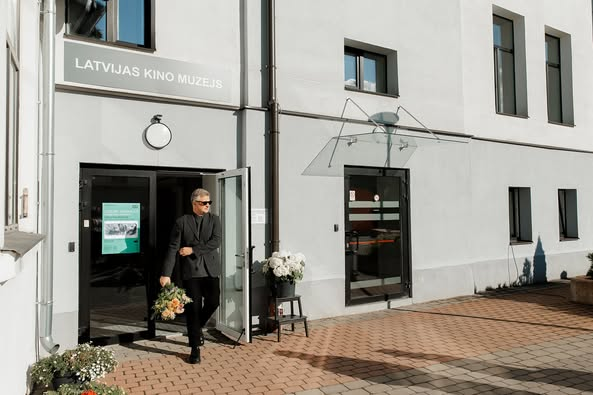
Latvian Film Museum

Throughout the years following Latvia's independence, the Latvian Film Museum has been a part of different institutions. It was a part of the National Film Centre of Latvia until 2010 when it was turned over to the Latvian Academy of Culture.

The Film Museum has relocated various times before settling to the current building in the Old Town. It was once in the rooms of ”Riga Video Centre”, the ”Latvian State Archive of Audiovisual Documents”, the ”Riga Film Studio” and the former ”Museum of Illegal Press” on Krāslavas Street.

On a regular basis the museum organizes mini exhibitions, lectures, events and movie screenings. It offers guided tours, lessons and creative workshops for both – film connoisseurs and those who only start to learn about film history.

== Permanent exhibition ==
As of August 2025 the permanent exhibition rooms are closed for renovation and an additional modern building is being built that in the future will house a new expanded and interactive exhibition about filmmaking and history of Latvian cinema.

== Creating Worlds. Latvian Production Designers and Film Artists ==
The current exhibition presents the diverse work of film artists, set designers, costume designers and makeup artists over a period of more than a hundred years, using materials from the Latvian Film Museum's collection – sketches, costumes, photographs, various objects and diverse visual material, also obtained from artists' private collections and film studios.

== Educational Programs in the Riga Film Museum ==
At the museum, you can sign up for educational activities such as "What is cinema?" The lesson starts with a visual journey through the history of cinema, exploring the origins of how the image was set in motion. The world’s first films are screened and an insight into the types and genres of cinema is given. Also you can try your hand at animation for the first time in workshop "Origins of Moving Pictures" where you can both see the first animation devices and try stop motion animation with modern equipment.
