= Baiba Indriksone =

Latvian film and stage actress (1932–2024)

Indriksone in 1959

Baiba Indriksone (22 February 1932 – 14 May 2024) was a Latvian film and stage actress, affiliated with the Latvian National Theatre.

== Life and career ==
Indriksone was born in Riga on 22 February 1932. She graduated from the Latvian State Conservatory, theatre class, in 1952. Her first role was that of Abelīte in the film Rainis (1949).

Her last role on a grand stage was in Henrik Ibsen's Peer Gynt directed by Viestur Kairish in 2016.

Indriksone was the widow of film director Aleksandrs Leimanis. She died on 14 May 2024, at the age of 92.

== Awards ==
- 1956: Medal "For Distinguished Labour"
- 2007: Officer of the Order of the Three Stars
- 2011: A. Amtmanis-Briedīša award for her work in performing arts
