= Riga Film Studio =

Film studio in Riga, Latvia

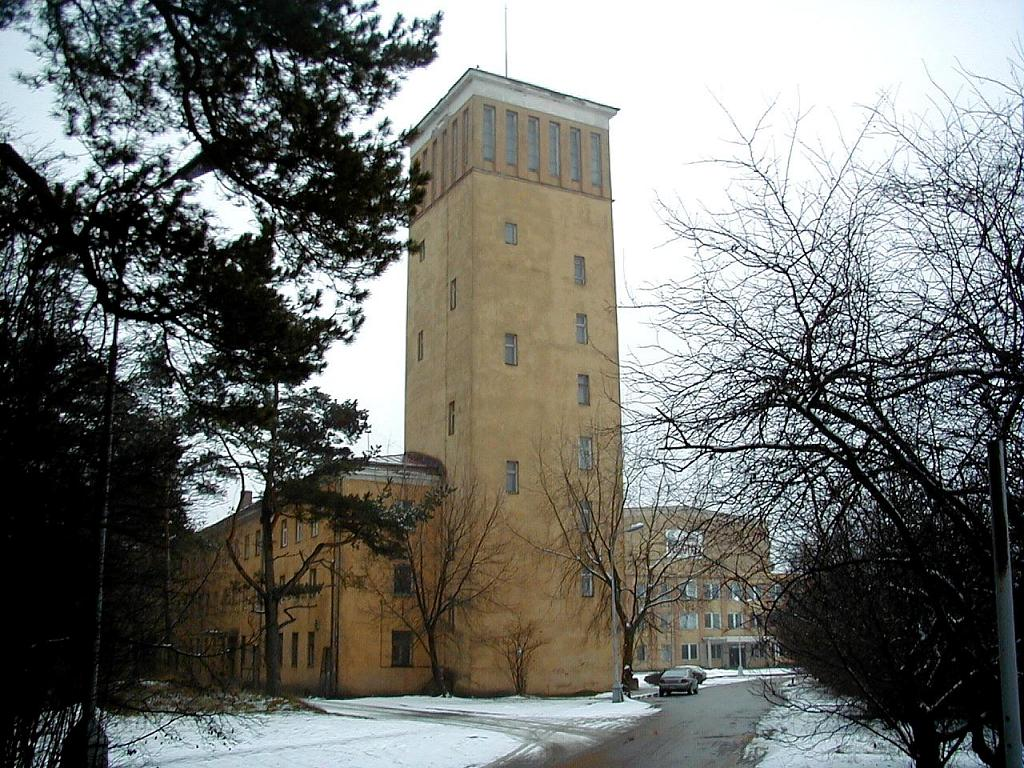
- Industry: Motion Pictures
- Founded: 1958
- Fate: Dormant
- Headquarters: Riga, Latvia
- Products: Motion Pictures

Riga Film Studio (Latvian: Rīgas Kinostudija, Russian: Рижская киностудия, romanized: Rizhskaya kinostudiya) is a Latvian film production company based in Riga and founded in 1940 on the basis of the earlier private film companies. In 1948, the Riga Documentary Film Studio was founded. It is one of the oldest film studios in Latvia.

In 1970–80, the company produced 10-15 films a year, providing work for 1,000 employees.

In 2007, a bill was rejected by the Council of Ministers of Latvia to privatize 125 films by RFS, they are still the State property.

Currently, there are no major filming's. The studio earns by leasing its facilities, offering expert services, and licensing films to distribution in Riga.

== History ==
In 1940 a studio was founded in Latvia under Soviet rule, which from then on was responsible for the production of newsreels.

== Notable films ==
Year	English title	Original title	Director
1969	zum zum	zum zum	Arvīds Cepurītis
1970	The Devil's Servants	Vella kalpi	Aleksandrs Leimanis
1971	In the Shadow of Death	Nāves ēnā	Gunārs Piesis
1972	Brick Kiln	Ceplis	Rolands Kalniņš
1972	The Devil's Servants at the Devil's Mill	Vella kalpi vella dzirnavās	Aleksandrs Leimanis
1973	Blow, Wind	Pūt, vējiņi	Gunārs Piesis
1975	My Frivolous Friend	Mans draugs – nenopietns cilvēks	Jānis Streičs
1978	Ten Minutes Older	Par desmit minūtēm vecāks	Herz Frank
1981	A Limousine the Colour of Midsummer's Eve	Limuzīns Jāņu nakts krāsā	Jānis Streičs
1984	Soloist Needed	Vajadzīga soliste	Genādijs Zemels
1985	Littlefinger	Sprīdītis	Gunārs Piesis
1985	Emil's Mischiefs	Emīla nedarbi	Varis Brasla
1986	Double Trap	Dubultslazds	Aloizs Brenčs
1997	The Mills of Fate	Likteņdzirnas	Jānis Streičs
2000	The Mystery of the Old Parish House	Vecās pagastmājas mistērija	Jānis Streičs

== See also ==
- List of Latvian films
- Lithuanian Film Studio
- Tallinnfilm
