= Aleksandrs Leimanis =

Latvian actor, film director (1913–1990)

Aleksandrs Leimanis (17 October 1913, in the village of Gavrilovo, Smolensk Governorate, Russian Empire – 17 June 1990, in Riga, Latvia SSR) was a Latvian actor and film director.

His film work spanned the Latvian Soviet period, during which he directed over fifteen films, including the cult classics, the action comedyThe Devil's Servants (1970) and the sequel the adventure comedy The Devil's Servants in the Devil's Mill (1973).

== Personal life ==
He was married to actress Baiba Indriksone.

== See also ==
- List of film directors
- List of Latvians
