= Gunārs Piesis =

Latvian film director

- Born: 19 July 1931; Riga, Latvia
- Died: 9 February 1996 (aged 64)
- Occupation: Film director
- Years active: 1961-1990

Gunārs Piesis (19 July 1931 – 9 February 1996) was a Latvian film director. Many of Piesis's films are adaptations of classic stories, and he was one of the most popular directors during the Soviet era. Popular films include Nāves ēna (1971), Pūt, vējiņi (1973), Sprīdītis (1985), and Maija un Paija (1991).

Piesis struggled with mental health issues during his career, which he documented in his diary. His archives are now in the Riga Film Museum.
