= Anna Brigadere =

Latvian writer

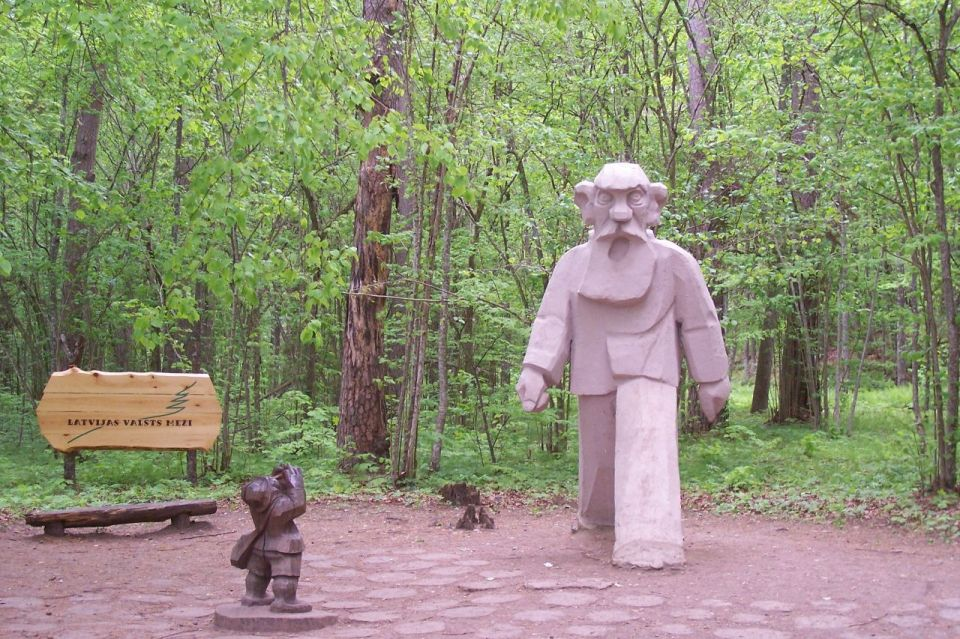
Sprīdītis playing the flute to make Lutausis dance (sculptures at Tērvete National Park)

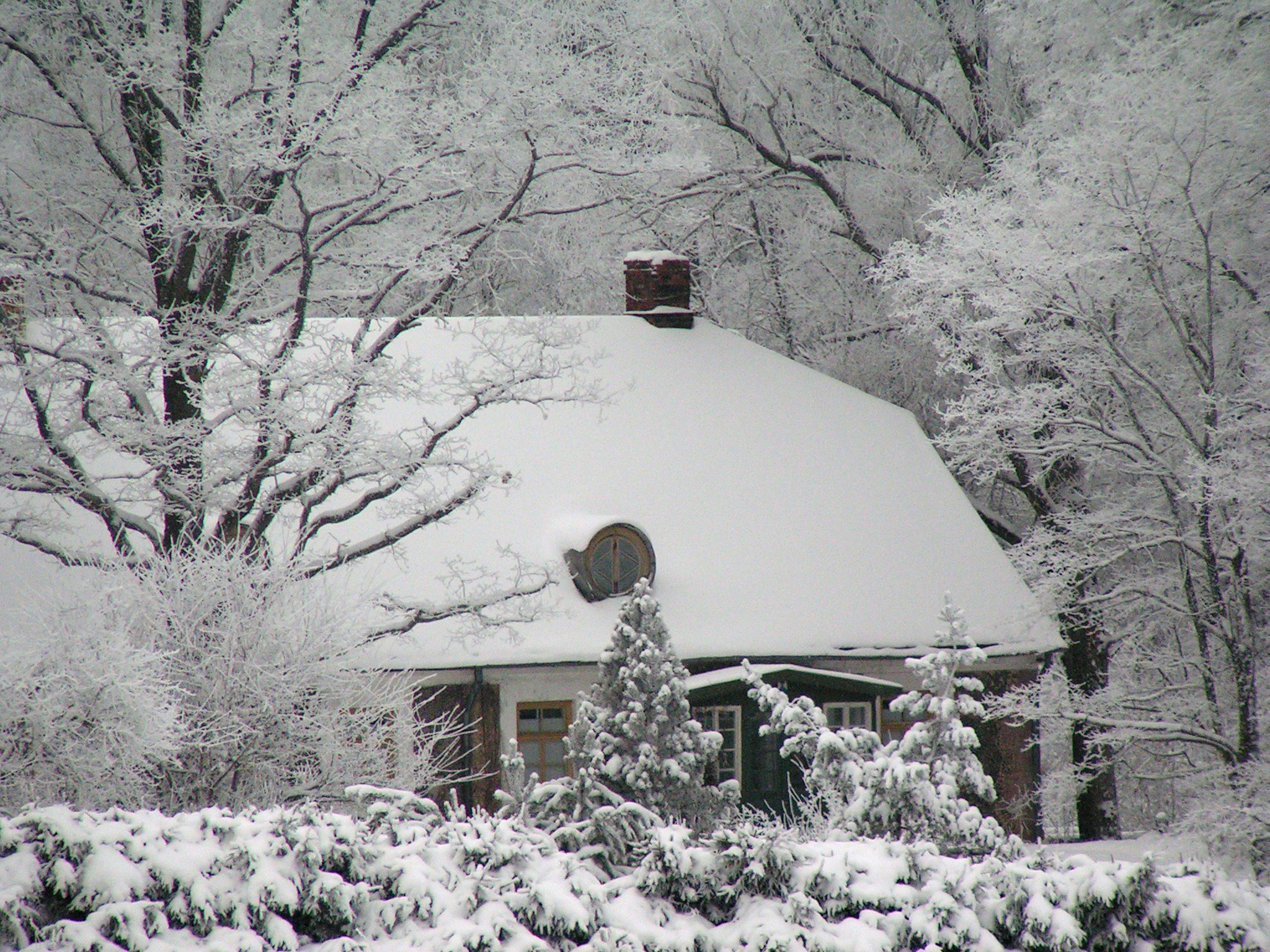
Anna Brigaderes memoriāls Tērvete, Latvijā

Anna Brigadere (October 1, 1861, in Tērvete – June 25, 1933, in Tērvete) was a writer, playwright and poet from Latvia.

== Biography ==
Her first story was published in 1896. In 1897, she turned her focus exclusively to literary work, and her first book Vecā Karlīne/Old Karlīna was published. Six years later, her first and most popular play Sprīdītis/The Tale of Sprīdītis was written for the Riga Latvian Theatre director Jēkabs Duburs, who staged the play in 1903. In 1985, the story was adapted for cinema, translated in several languages. World War I would lead her to emigrate to Moscow. In 1918, she returned to Riga and continued there her literary creation.

== Works ==
She wrote comedy and drama, among which The Tale of Sprīdītis, a young boy from a Latvian peasant family and his fantastic adventures in a nearby forest. She also wrote four autobiographies, among which Dievs, daba, darbs (God, Nature, Work) about the life of a Latvian woman in the late 19th century.

== Awards and honors ==
- The Anna Brigadere Prize was re-established in 1986 to celebrate achievements in Latvian literature.
- 1932, The Culture Fund Prize for In the Harsh Winds
- 1927, The Culture Fund Prize for Lolita's Magic Bird
- 1926, the Order of the Three Stars 3rd Class.
- 1913, Riga Latvian Society Award.

== Bibliography ==
- Anna Brigadere un Tērvete / sastādījis Jānis Rapa. Rīgā: Preses Nams, 1996. ISBN 9984-00-226-8 (in Latvian)
- Zenta Mauriņa. Baltais ceļš : studija par Annu Brigaderi. Rīga: Zvaigzne ABC, 1996. ISBN 9984-04-304-5 (in Latvian)
- Meškova, Sandra (2002). Two mothers of Latvian literature: Aspazija and Anna Brigadere. Journal of Baltic Studies 34.3, 276-297.
