= Rolands Kalniņš =

Latvian film director (1922–2022)

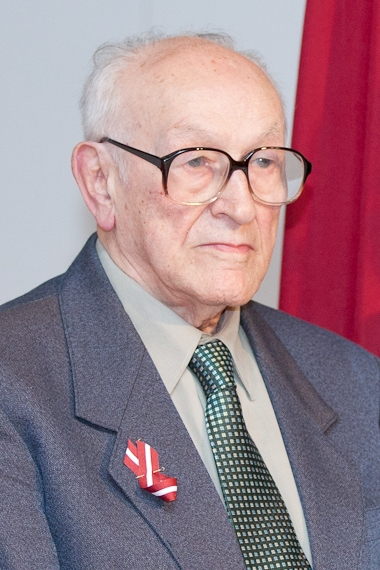
- Kalniņš in 2012
- Born: 9 May 1922; Vecslabada, Istra Parish, Latvia
- Died: 17 May 2022 (aged 100)
- Education: Riga State Gymnasium No.1
- Occupations: Film director, screenwriter, producer
- Awards: Best Screenplay Award at the Chisinau Film Festival; Latvian Film Prize for Best Documentary; Lifetime Achievement Award

Rolands Kalniņš (9 May 1922 – 17 May 2022) was a Latvian film director, screenwriter, and producer.

== Biography ==
Rolands Kalniņš was born on 9 May 1922 in Vecslabada, Istra Parish, Latvia to a post worker family. From 1937 to 1940, he studied at the Riga State Gymnasium No.1.

He worked at the port, delivered bread, was a delivery boy for the newspaper Jaunākās Ziņas and Armijas ekkonomijas bouķis (later a department store, now Galerija Centrs ), and was also a freelance sports journalist for the newspapers Padomju Latvija and Cīņa. He was involved in athletics and basketball, and his interest in sports was later reflected in several of Kalniņš's feature films.

He was an inspector of the Theatre Department of the Arts Administration (1945–46), during which time he developed an interest and knowledge of the world of culture.

In 1947, he started working as a director at the Riga Film Studio, instantly from an assistant director to a second director. His films I Remember Everything, Richard and Four White Shirts were pulled from cinemas as they were declared undesirable.

He won Best Screenplay Award at the Chișinău Film Festival (1967) for his film I Remember Everything, Richard. In 1980, his film Saruna ar karalieni received the Latvian National Film Festival Prize for best documentary, and in 2005 he received an Award for Life Contribution. In 1991, he produced Cilvēka bērns. He turned 100 on 9 May 2022, and died on 17 May.

== See also ==
- I Remember Everything, Richard
