= Latvian literature =

Latvian literature began to develop in the 18th century. Latvian secular literature began with Gotthard Friedrich Stender who produced didactic tales or idyllic portrayals of country life.

== Early Latvian literature ==
Before there was a written Latvian language, traditions were passed along in folk songs that are still preserved. Poetry and prose was written on a small scale in the 18th century, most notably by Gotthard Friedrich Stender. But Latvian literature began in earnest in the nineteenth century. Juris Alunans tried to show that deep and noble feelings could also be expressed in Latvian, which the Baltic-German Barons regarded as a peasant tongue. Alunans' volume of poetry was published in 1856, the same year as Charles Baudelaire's Les Fleurs du Mal, the starting point of European modernism in poetry. The national epic, Lāčplēsis, published in 1888 was written by Andrejs Pumpurs.

In the beginning of the 20th century, mainly through the many German and Russian connections, Latvian literature had diverging movements of symbolism, decadence, and politically – socialism, Marxism, these movements went underground after the defeat of the largest national Latvian uprising the 1905 revolution – and the revenge from the tsarist regime was severe, leading to the first emigration of intellectuals from Latvia.

Rainis was a poet, playwright, translator, and politician at the turn of the century; his classic plays "Fire and Night" (Latvian: Uguns un nakts, 1905) and "Indulis and Ārija" (Latvian: Indulis un Ārija, 1911) had a profound influence on the literary Latvian language, and the ethnic symbolism he employed in his major works has been central to Latvian nationalism. Rainis was the first to formulate the idea that Latvia could be, not a part of a more democratic Russian Empire – but a sovereign state. He married Aspazija, also a writer, active in the feminist movement. They were exiled to inner Russia from 1897–1903, and lived in Switzerland from 1905–1920. When they returned to an independent Latvia after World War I, Aspazija also joined the Latvian Social Democratic Workers' Party, and was a member of all sessions of Parliament of Latvia from 1920 to 1934.

A writer who similarly to Rainis sought new ways for Latvian literature was Viktors Eglītis. He was influenced by Russian symbolism and came to represent the decadent movement in Latvia. In the early 20th century he aggressively introduced modernist poetics in the country. Later he turned to patriotic historical fiction.

== Literature in independent Latvia ==
In 1918 with the beginning of first period of Independence, modern literature began to emerge.

Aleksandrs Čaks (real name Čadarainis) glorified the capital city of Riga and its outskirts, romanticizing the everyday side of life, writing of poverty and prostitutes in poetry, which was previously not done. He also wrote an epic poem, "Mūžības Skartie", dedicated to the Latvian riflemen. In 1949, when Latvia was part of the Soviet Union, Čaks was accused of writing politically incorrect works: the attacks weakened his health, and he died of heart disease on 8 February 1950.

Eriks Ādamsons and Vilis Cedriņš, were just beginning to publish at the time of the German takeover. At this time many Latvian writers went into exile, such as Linards Tauns, Gunārs Saliņš, Jānis Sodums, Alfreds Dziļums, Andrejs Eglītis, Velta Sniķere, Gunārs Janovskis. Agate Nesaule wrote of her experiences during this emigration. Among those who were in exile and returned to their homeland after it became independent in 1991 are poets Astrid Ivask, Margarita Gūtmane, Roberts Muks, Andrejs Eglītis, Jānis Sodums.

== Latvian Literature after Second World War ==
After World War II Latvian literary activity was split into three parts – those writers still in Latvia, those in the Gulags (after two mass-deportations in 1941 and 1949) and writers who had fled to the West. After World War II, for some years the centre of Latvian Literature was Sweden.

In the mid 1950s young Latvian writers in exile started to publish their works in Stockholm, London and New York City. The NY Hell's Kitchen group became the leading one. Secondly, in the Soviet union Nikita Khrushchev revealed the Stalinist-era crimes against humanity at the 20th congress of the Communist Party in 1956. In literature this led to the so-called 56 generation. In Latvia notable representatives included Ojārs Vācietis, Imants Ziedonis and Vizma Belševica.

Valentīns Jākobsons and Knuts Skujenieks had been sent to labor camps in Siberia, and were among those who survived to return and write about their experience, along with Sandra Kalniete, who was born in a Siberian labor camp to Latvian parents and became Latvian Foreign Affairs Minister in 2002.

Poets who remained and published in Soviet-controlled Latvia included Vizma Belševica, Imants Ziedonis, Ojārs Vācietis, Māris Čaklais; novelists Zigmunds Skujiņš, Regīna Ezera, Alberts Bels; and a younger generation who grew up during those times, such as poets Klāvs Elsbergs (son of Vizma Belševica), Uldis Bērziņš, Amanda Aizpuriete, Pēters Brūveris, Anna Auziņa, Knuts Skujenieks, Māris Melgalvs. Māra Zālīte, who once wrote poetry, has written musicals for the past years.

Latgalian writers include Jānis Klīdzējs, Anna Rancāne, Oskars Seiksts, Valentīns Lukaševičs, Ingrida Tārauda, Laima Muktupāvela and others. Recently the new writers have been writing in two and three languages, with texts in Russian or English appearing alongside texts in the Latvian or Latgalian literary languages. Every year the latest Latgalian is published in a Latgalian Literary almanac. Since 1990 books written in the Latgalian literary language have been published mainly by the Publishing House of the Culture Centre of Latgale, run by Jānis Elksnis (Rēzekne).

First-generation children born to Latvian parents in exile who became writers include Sven Birkerts, poet Juris Kronbergs and Margita Gūtmane.

== Since 1991 ==
The youngest generation of Latvian writers includes Inga Ābele, poet, novelist and playwright; poets Edvīns Raups, Andris Akmentiņš, Pēteris Draguns, Eduards Aivars, Liana Langa, Anna Auziņa, Kārlis Vērdiņš, Marts Pujāts and Inga Gaile; prose writers include Pauls Bankovskis, Jānis Einfelds, Gundega Repše, Andra Neiburga, Laima Muktupāvela, Kristīne Ulberga and Nora Ikstena.

The Latvian Literature Center was founded in 2002 to foster international recognition of and access to Latvian fiction, poetry, plays and children's literature. After 2015, its functions were overtaken by the Latvian Literature platform.

Strange Heart Beating, a 2017 novel was written by British author of Latvian descent Eli Goldstone, is set largely in Latvia.

== See also ==
- List of libraries in Latvia
