= Gunārs Saliņš =

Latvian poet (1924-2010)

Gunars Saliņš
- Born: 21 April 1924; Dobele, Latvia
- Died: 29 June 2010 (aged 86); Glen Ridge, New Jersey, US
- Education: Upsala College
- Occupation: Poet
- Spouse: Jautrīte Saliņa

Gunars Saliņš (21 April 1924 – 29 June 2010) was a modernist poet within the Latvian lyric poetry tradition. He became a leading voice of the "Hell's Kitchen artists" (Elles ķēķis)—a Latvian emigre artist community in the U.S. which flourished in the 1950s and 60s, named after the neighborhood in New York where it originated. In his youth, he was inspired by the Latvian poet Aleksandrs Čaks and later by writers such as Rainer Maria Rilke, Guillaume Apollinaire, Federico García Lorca, and Dylan Thomas. Saliņš' imagery playfully explored transformational and metaphysical elements in this world and beyond, often incorporating his personal experiences with allusions to myth, art, and ancient Latvian folklore—a process he referred to as "orpheism". Gunars Saliņš's poetry was widely circulated within the Latvian diaspora post-WWII; later, his work was rediscovered and championed in Latvia in the post-Soviet era. In 2000, Saliņš was awarded the Order of the Three Stars by the Republic of Latvia.

== Academic and family life ==
Gunars Saliņš was born on April 21, 1924, in Dobele, Latvia, where his father was the principal of the local school. Gunars followed his father's footsteps, graduating from the Teachers' Training Institute in Jelgava, Latvia in 1944. Soon after, the Soviet regime re-occupied the country, and he, together with his wife, Jautrite, set forth to start a new life elsewhere. After spending five years in a displaced persons' camp in Augsburg, Germany, they were granted permission to emigrate to the United States, eventually settling in New Jersey. They both completed their university studies in the US. Gunars became a professor of psychology and sociology, and taught at Union College from 1955 to 1996, having earned his B.A. at Upsala College, New Jersey, and his M.A. at the New School for Social Research, New York. Jautrite Saliņš earned her doctorate in German Literature at Rutgers University, and went on to teach German language and literature until her retirement from Kean College, New Jersey. She later completed a 3-volume family memoir and assisted with the publication of Gunars' collected poems. They have three children: Laris, Laila and Lalita; and four grandchildren: Andrejs, Niklavs, Alida and Aldis. Gunars (known by his family and friends as Gonka) died in his home on June 29, 2010.

== Literary activity ==
- Poetry published in newspapers and magazines in Latvia, Germany and the U.S., beginning with 1945
- Founding member (together with his close friend, the poet Linards Tauns) of the "Hell's Kitchen artists" - a Latvian emigre artist community, centered around New York City, in the late 1950s and 60s
- Poetry volumes, reviews and anthologies published in the US from 1957 to 1979; in Latvia from 1993 to 2006
- Reviews of contemporary Latvian poetry, and translations of Rainer Maria Rilke's poetry

== Awards ==
Gunars Saliņš was awarded multiple awards for his poetry. Thrice he won the cultural award of the World Federation of Free Latvians (PBLA), in 1968, in 1980 and in 2008. In 1982 he received the Zinaida Lazda award for his poetry collection Rendez-vous (Satikšanās). In 2000 he was awarded the Order of the Three Stars by the Latvian government, and in 2006 he was awarded the "Yearly Literature Award" from the Writers' Association of Latvia, honoring his lifetime achievement in poetry.: "Writings - Poetry"

== Works ==
=== Poetry collections ===
- Tavern of Fog and other poems (Miglas krogs un citi dzejoļi), publ. in Brooklyn in 1957 by Grāmatu Draugs (Book Friend)
- Black Sun (Melnā saule), publ. in Brooklyn in 1967 by Grāmatu Draugs
- Rendez-vous (Satikšanās), publ. in Brooklyn in 1979 by Grāmatu Draugs
- Inspirations-- from Naudite to Hell's Kitchen and 33 poems - quite recent (Iedvesmas no Naudītes līdz Elles ķēķim un 33 dzejoļi — itin neseni) publ. in Riga by Fateful Stories (Likteņstāsti), 1997)
- Rendez-vous at the Tavern of Fog by the Black Sun (Satiksimies miglas krogā pie melnās sales), publ. in 1993 in Riga by the Press Club, edited by Māris Čaklais
- Writings - Volume 1 - Poetry, publ. in 2006 in Riga by Valters & Rapa, edited by Kārlis Vērdiņš
- Writings - Volume 2 - Poetry. Translations. Prose, publ. in 2023 in Riga by ILFA, edited by Kārlis Vērdiņš.

=== In translation ===
- Lettische Lyrik. Atdz. E. Zuzena-Metuzala. Maximilian Dietrich Verlag (1983) (in German)
- Nära röster över vatten. Tulk. Juris Kronbergs. Stockholm: En bok för alla (1997) (in Swedish)
- Антология на съвременната латвийска поезия [Contemporary Latvian poetry anthology] Translated by Aksīnija Mihailova. Sofija: Foundation for Bulgarian Literature (2008) (in Bulgarian)

==== English ====
- Translations from Latvian (poetry of Gunars Salins and Linards Tauns in English, Exeter, 1968) by Ruth Speirs
- Contemporary Latvian Poetry edited by Inara Cedrins, Iowa Translations series, 1984, The University of Iowa
- Contemporary East European Poetry: An Anthology, Emery George (Editor), Oxford University Press, USA; Expanded edition (February 17, 1994).
- All Birds Know This. Selected Contemporary Latvian Poetry; editors Astrīde Ivaska and Māra Rūmniece, publ. by Tapals (2001)

== Sources ==
- Gunars Saliņš: Poet of the Two Suns. Astrid Ivask. publ. in Books Abroad, Vol. 43, No. 1 (Winter, 1969), pp. 55–58:
- The Intervention of Art in the Poetry of Gunars Saliņš. Inta Ezergailis, publ. in LITUANUS, the Lithuanian Quarterly Journal of Arts and Sciences, Vol. 26
- Poetic text and human feeling in Gunars Saliņš and Henrikas Radauskas". Rimvydas Šilbajoris, Journal of Baltic Studies, Vol. 13, Issue 2, June 1982, pgs. 91-97
- Gunars Saliņš (1924-2010), dzejas izlase. Jaunā Gaita, Nr. 263, ziema 2010
