= List of compositions by Aivars Kalējs =

This is a list of compositions by Aivars Kalējs classified by genre (2011– period and list of transcriptions are incomplete).

== Orchestral music ==
- Concertino for piano and orchestra, op. 11 (1971/73)
- Elegy, for symphony orchestra, op. 12 (1973)
- Agnus Dei, for mixed choir and chamber orchestra, op. 49a (1992/2003)
- De profundis, for symphony orchestra, op. 56 (1997/2000)
- Musica dolente, for symphony orchestra, op. 65 (2001/2003), dedicated to the innocent victims of the tragic events of September 11, 2001

== Organ music ==
- Variations, op. 9 (1970)
- Phantasie - Dithyramb, op. 14 (1972/1976)
- Melody, op. 16 (1975)
- Fanfaras, op. 21 (1975)
- Chaconne, op. 24 (1978)
- Improvisation on the word ALAIN, op. 27 (1979)
- Symphonic poem Fireworks, op. 32 (1981)
- Dorian variations, op. 44 (1984, 1986)
- Variazioni antichi, op. 45 (1989)
- Per aspera ad astra, op. 46 (1989)
- Toccata on the Janis Medins’ choir song Tev mūžam dzīvot, Latvija!, op. 48 (1990)
- Via dolorosa, op. 49 (1992)
- Lamento (1992)
- Lux aeterna (hommage a O. Messiaen), op. 51 (1995)
- Toccata on the Chorale Allein Gott in der Höh sei Ehr, op.57 (1998), cello and organ arrangement (2004)
- Postlude hommage a Jehan Alain, op. 59 (1999)
- In Paradisum, op. 58 (1999)
- Prayer, op.62 (2001)
- Cantus Memento 1941! (2002)
- Prelude on G. F. Handel's theme Joy to the World! (2005)
- Lux aeterna II (2005)
- Musica dolente (2006)
- Chorale Sonata (2009)
- Solitudinem faciunt, in memory of victims in Zolitūde shopping centre roof collapse, op. 100 (2013/2016)
- Toccata in C, for organ duo (2014), trio version with percussions (2015)
- Ceremonial March (2016)
- Perpetuum mobile (2016)
- Himna dzimtenei - Hymn for Homeland (2018)

== Piano music ==
=== Cycles ===
- Children's cycle Saules stars - Ray of Sunlight (1975)
- Piano cycle French Album, op. 55, 11 works, ≈60 min. (1997)
- Le stagioni per sotto voce (Seasons in an Undertone), op. 61 (2000)
- Piano cycle for young pianists En mouvement (In Motion) (2001/2009)

=== Other ===
- Prelude, op. 1 (1967)
- Three dances, op. 2 (1968)
- Variations, op. 3 (1969)
- Divas dainas (Two Folk Songs), op. 5 (1969)
- Sonata, op. 10 (1971)
- Sonatina, op. 22 (1977)
- Retro Suite, op. 25 (1978)
- Impulse, op. 23 (1978)
- Saucieni I, II - Calls I, II, op. 29 (1979, 80)
- Garīgais un laicīgais - Spiritual and Timely, 3 works, op. 33 (1982)
- Diatonic toccata variations, op. 45 (1985)
- Waltz, op. 48 (1991)
- Trois Gymnopédies (2003)
- Deuxième nocturne (2002)
- Consolation (2003)
- Vita nuova (2004)
- Trois postludes à la mémoire de ma mère- Three postludes in the memory of my mother (2004)
- Deux études (2004/2005)
- L’ile douce - Firest Isle (2005)
- Tango (2006)
- Canzonetta (2007)
- Gymnopèdies n.4 and n.5 (2007)
- Rūsa - Heat Lightning, in memory of Ādolfs Skulte, op. 84 (2009)

== Chamber music ==
=== Instrumental chamber music ===
- Suite, for oboe and piano (1970)
- Three works, for violin and piano, op. 14 (1975)
- Dialogues I, II, III, for cello and piano, op. 13 (1975)
- Vēja dziesma (Wind Song), for flute and piano, op. 37 (1984)
- Toccata, for violin solo, op. 40 (1985)
- Waltz, for violin and piano, op. 48 (1991)
- Rendez-vous sous la pluie, for piccolo flute, and piano, op. 55a, or piccolo flute, violin and piano (1997/2016)
- Elevation, for violin / flute and organ, op. 52 (1991)
- La jeune fille au cheval couleur de lin for oboe and piano / violin, oboe or flute and piano, op. 55b (1999/2016)
- Viator Dei, for French horn / viola / cello and organ / piano (2005)
- Via crucis for organ, bells and timpani (1996/2011)
- Toccata on a Lutheran Chorale Ļauj mums tagad sirsnīgi priecāties! for organ, bells and timpani (2011)
- Die alte Standuhr for viola and organ / piano
- Laika rits ir neapturams... for viola and organ / piano
- Fugue on the Chorale Ein Feste Burg ist unser Gott and Blues, for saxophone quartet and organ (2017)

=== Vocal chamber music ===
- 2 songs, for voice and piano, op. 4, text by Laimonis Vāczemnieks, Egils Plaudis, (1969)
- 2 songs, for voice and piano, op. 7, text by Charles van Lerberghe (1970)
- Three arrangements of Latvian folk songs, for voice and piano
- Aiz upītes es uzaugu, for voice, flute and piano, op. 36/3
- Ave Maria, for mezzo-soprano / alto / baritone and piano / organ, op. 64/2 (2002)
- Ave Maria, for soprano / tenor and piano / organ, op. 64/1 (2002)
- Deux Madrigaux, for soprano, flute and piano, text by Victor Hugo, Amadis Jamyn
- Songs of Innocence, for soprano, (tenor), flute and piano, text by William Blake (2007)
- Arrivée des Exotes en forme d’un Rondo, for soprano and organ (2010)
- Spiritual evening songs, for tenor, alto-saxophone and organ (2016)

== Choir music ==
- Five mixed choir songs: Zelta tvaiks Text – Jānis Rainis; Torņi Text – Egils Plaudis; Tad apstājās laiks Text – Imants Ziedonis; Vocalize Dzimtenes ainava; Zvana vārdi Text – Vizma Belševica
- For mixed choir: Autumn with flute, oboe un cello / piano; Spring Madrigal with oboe and piano (harpsichord), op. 8 Text – Victor Hugo, Amadis Jamyn (1970)
- Mana dzimtene - My homeland, for women's choir, op. 19 (1976) Text by Egils Plaudis
- Variations on a theme from a midsummer song from the Talsi region, for mixed choir, op. 28 (1979)
- Latvian folk songs arr. for mixed choir and piano: Sniga sniegi putināja with oboe, Visu dienu bites dzinu with English horn, op. 30b (1980)
- Seven Scandinavian folk song arr., for mixed choir, op. 31 (1980)
- Two French folk song arr. for mixed vocal ensemble or choir & piano, op. 35/1 (1983)
- Two folk dances, for mixed vocal ensemble or choir, op. 34 (1983)
- Old Joe Clark, American folk song arr., for mixed choir and piano, op. 35/2 (1983)
- Seven arrangements of songs by Andris Kārkliņš (El Leton) with lyrics by Ojārs Vācietis, for mixed vocal ensemble or choir with guitar or piano, op. 36/1-2 (1984)
- Songs of Innocence - Bezvainības dziesmas, for chamber choir, flute and organ or piano, op. 38 (1984), for female / children's choir, flute and organ / piano (2016) Poetry by William Blake
- Two songs with lyrics by Mirdza Ķempe, for mixed choir and piano, op. 42 (1985)
- Saule Laimu aicināja, for mixed choir and piano, op. 41 (1985). Text by Marga Tetere
- Pavane, for mixed choir, op. 39 (1985). Text by Oliver Goldsmith
- Chorales, for the Evangelic Lutheran Hymnal, op. 53 (1997)
- Aizvestie - The Departed, for mixed choir (2005). Text by Kārlis Skalbe

== Transcriptions for organ ==
- J.S. Bach - Final Chorus from St Mattheus Passion
- J.S. Bach - Sinfonia in D Major from Cantata BWV 29

== Scores ==
- Sheet music - Toccata for violin solo by Kalējs
- Sheet music - Songs of Innocence for female / children's choir, flute, organ / piano
- Sheet music - "Via Dolorosa" by Kalējs
- Sheet music - Per aspera ad astra by Kalējs
- Sheet music - Toccata on the Chorale "Gloria in excelcis Deo"/"Allein Gott in der Höh sei Ehr" by Kalējs
- Sheet music - Edition Peters - Kalējs, Aivars "Prayer" (Lūgšana)
- Sheet music - Two Madrigals for soprano, flute/oboe and piano by Kalējs
- Sheet music - Pique-nique à la Manière de Manet for soprano and piano by Kalējs
- Sheet music and records - Aivars Kalējs
