= Ieva Lešinska =

Latvian translator, journalist and editor (born 1958)

- Born: 2 July 1958; Riga, modern-day Latvia
- Occupations: Translator, journalist, editor

Ieva Lešinska (born 2 July 1958) is a Latvian translator, journalist and editor.

== Biography ==
Ieva Lešinska-Geibere (Ieva Lešinska) studied English philology at the University of Latvia. In 1978 she defected to the United States with her father Imants Lešinskis, a USSR diplomat who was a spy for the US, where she was granted political asylum. In the USA Lešinska studied at Ohio State University and the University of Colorado. In 1987 she moved to Sweden, where she worked as a journalist and translator, and studied for a Master of Arts in Baltic philology at the Stockholm University. She now lives in Riga and works as a translator.

The story of Lešinska and her father's defection to the USA was made into the film "My Father the Spy" which premiered in June 2019 at Sheffield International Documentary Festival. In the film, Lešinska investigates the life of her father, Imants Lešinskis, who was a double agent and spy for the CIA and KGB, and the events which led him to organising for her to visit him on the holiday which would lead to her defection. The film describes the story of how Lešinska was forced to leave Latvia and her mother, whom she would never see again, and became a political refugee in the USA. Member of the Latvian Writers' Union (2004).

== Bibliography ==
=== Translations into English ===
- Uldis Bērziņš. An Ordinary Stone (Parasts akmens). Rīga, 1992.
- Māris Čaklais. Ten Love Songs to Riga (Desmit mīlas dziesmas Rīgai). Rīga: Pētergailis, 2000.
- Six Latvian Poets [A. Auziņa, I. Balode, A. Krivade, M. Pujāts, M. Salējs, K. Vērdiņš]. Todmorden: Arc Publications, 2011.
- Kārlis Vērdiņš. Come to Me. Todmorden: Arc Publications, 2015.
- Aleksandrs Čaks. Touched by Eternity. Rīga: Jumava, 2017.
- Pauls Bankovskis. 18. Vagabond Voices, 2017.
- Inga Gaile. 30 Questions People Don't Ask. Warrensburg, MO: Pleiades Press, 2018.
- Aleksandrs Čaks. Selected Poems. Bristol: Shearsman Books, 2019.

=== Translations into Latvian ===
- Therese Anne Fowler. Z: A Novel of Zelda Fitzgerald (Z – romāns par Zeldu Ficdžeraldu). Rīga: Zvaigzne ABC, 2016.
- James Breslin. Mark Rothko: A Biography (Marks Rotko: biogrāfija). Rīga: Jumava, 2014.
- Mike Collier. The Fourth Largest in Latvia (Ceturtais lielākais Latvijā). Rīga: Mansards, 2014.
- Timothy D. Snyder. Bloodlands (Asinszemes). Rīga: Jumava, 2013.
- Toni Morrison. A Mercy (Žēlastība). Rīga: Zvaigzne ABC, 2012.
- John Cornwell. A Pontiff in Winter (Pāvests ziemā). Rīga: Atēna, 2008.
- Toni Morrison. Beloved (Mīļotā). Rīga: Zvaigzne ABC, 2006.
- Jhumpa Lahiri. The Namesake (Vārdabrālis). Rīga: Atēna, 2005.
- John Irving. The Cider House Rules (Sidra nama likumi). Rīga: Jumava, 2004.
- David Lodge. Small World (Mazā pasaule). Rīga: Jāņa Rozes apgāds, 2003.
- Bret Easton Ellis. American Psycho (Amerikāņu psihs). Rīga: Jumava, 2003.
- Modris Eksteins. Walking Since Daybreak (Ceļā kopš rītausmas). Rīga: Atēna, 2002.
