= Repše =

Repše is a Latvian and Slovak surname. Individuals with the surname include:

- Gundega Repše (born 1960), Latvian writer;
- Einars Repše (born 1961), Latvian physicist, financier and politician.
