= Baltic Assembly Prize for Literature, the Arts and Science =

Science award

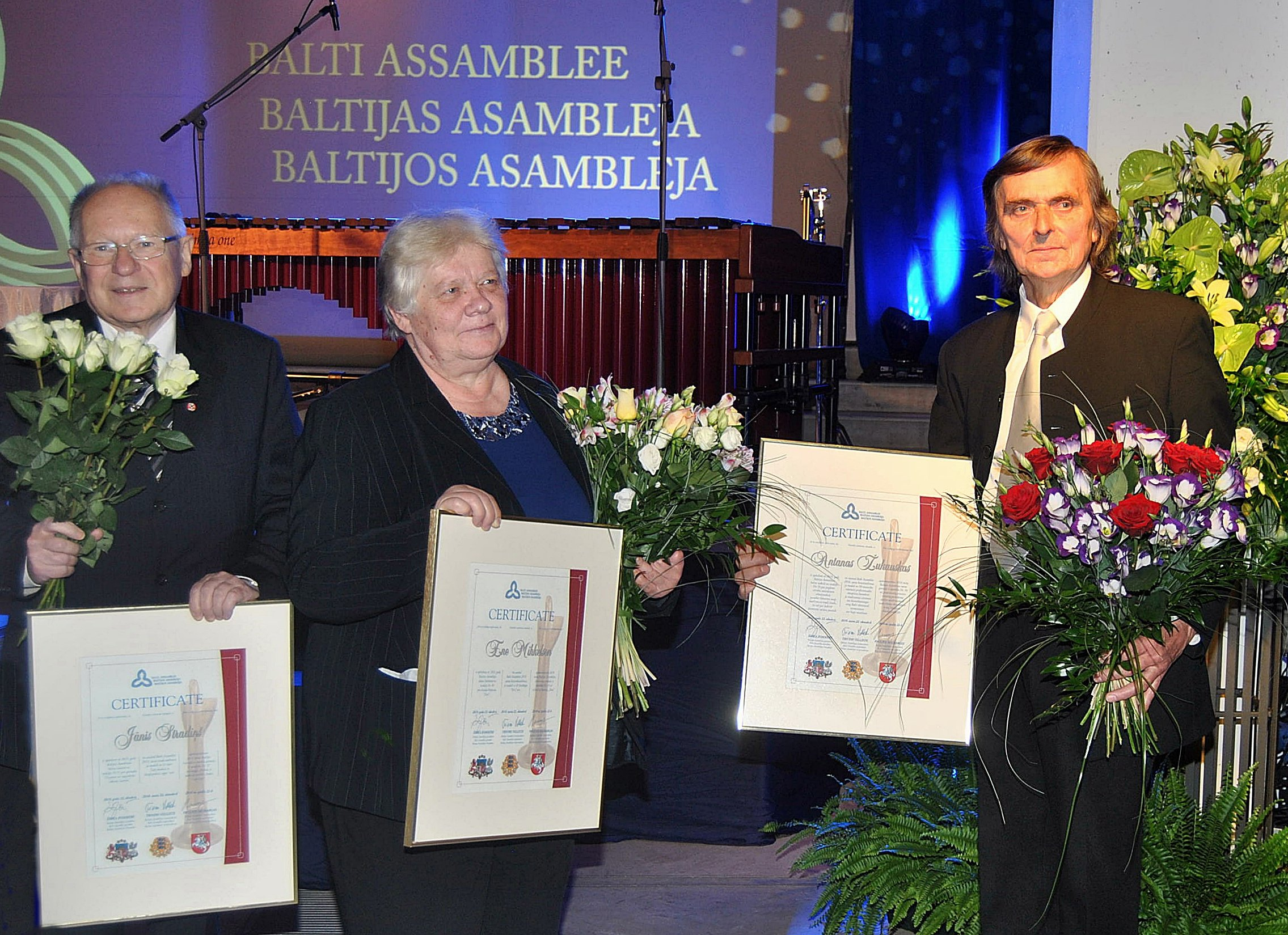
The prize awarding ceremony in 2010

The Baltic Assembly Prize for Literature, the Arts and Science is an award given annually by the Baltic Assembly for achievements in three categories: literature, art and science.

The prize is an annual award given to a citizen of Estonia, Latvia or Lithuania "for outstanding achievements" in three categories: literature, art and science. It was awarded for the first time in 1994 and consists of a statuette, a diploma and a sum of money, presently (2016) 5,000 euro. It is awarded during the formal session of the assembly. A joint jury consisting of three persons per prize make the decision on whom to award the prize. The purpose of the award is according to the Baltic Assembly to "demonstrate the common interests of the countries in this region in upholding of their national identity and self-esteem; create an opportunity to learn about the achievements of the neighbouring countries; maintain a continuous interest among the people in Estonia, Latvia and Lithuania about developments in the Baltic States; strengthen cooperation among the Baltic States in the fields of literature, the arts and science; encourage more and more people to become interested in the intellectual values and languages of the Baltic nations; and raise the level of literature, the arts and science in the Baltic States."

== List of recipients of the Baltic Assembly Prize for Literature ==
The following list is based on the official webpage of the Baltic Assembly.

Year	Recipient of the award	Country	Rationale
1994	Tõnu Õnnepalu	Estonia	"for his novel "The Border Land""
1995	Uldis Bērziņš	Latvia	"for his collections of poetry "Stepsounds of Insects", "Time" and "Poetry""
1996	Judita Vaičiūnaitė	Lithuania	"for her poetry collection "Wreaths of Zemyna""
1997	Jaan Kaplinski	Estonia	"for the essays and poetry of the past three years"
1998	Sigitas Geda	Lithuania	"for the poetical metamorphoses during the past three years"
1999	Jaan Kross	Estonia	"for his novel "Standstill Flight""
2000	Jānis Rokpelnis	Latvia	"for his collection of poems "Lyrics", (1999)"
2001	Justinas Marcinkevičius	Lithuania	"for his recent lyrical poetry, particularly for the collection of poems "Carmina Minora""
2002	Jaan Tätte	Estonia	"for his plays "The Bridge and Happy Everyday!""
2003	Vytautas Bubnys	Lithuania	"for his novel "In a Dove's Flutter""
2004	Pēters Brūveris	Latvia	"for his poetry book "The Landscape of Language" and publications during the past three years"
2005	Hasso Krull	Estonia	"for his collection of poetry "Meeter ja Demeeter" ("Metre and Demeter")"
2006	Nora Ikstena	Latvia	"for her book "The Undefined One"(2006), and for the unique collaboration with the Latvian poet Imants Ziedonis, as well as for humanism and the significant work in the field of culture"
2007	Marcelijus Martinaitis	Lithuania	"for his books "K.B. Suspected" (2004) and "Silent discourses" (2006)"
2008	Knuts Skujenieks	Latvia	"for his Works in eight volumes, which contain high-quality poetry of particular value, written in prison and in a camp for political prisoners in Mordovia, where poet as Soviet dissident, spent seven years"
2009	Inga Ābele	Latvia	"for the novel "Paisums" (eng. Tide) (2008)"
2010	Ene Mihkelson	Estonia	"for her collected poetry "Torn" (Tower, 2010)"
2011	Arvydas Juozaitis	Lithuania	"for his book "Riga - No One's Civilization" (2011)"
2012	Aivars Kļavis	Latvia	"for his tetralogy "On the Other Side of the Gate" (Viņpus vārtiem, 1995-2012)"
2013	Donaldas Kajokas	Lithuania	"for his poetry "To the deaf little donkey", 2011, and the novel "The Lake and its escorting persons", 2012"
2014	Peeter Sauter	Estonia	"for his novel "Do Not Leave Me Alone" ("Ära jäta mind rahule"), 2012"
2015	Māris Bērziņš	Latvia	"for his novel "The Taste of Lead", 2015"
2016	Sigitas Parulskis	Lithuania	"for his latest creative work, his broad and sharp worldview, his ability to grasp fundamental issues and his contemporary poetics"
2017	Vladas Braziūnas	Lithuania	"for his poetic discoveries made while delving into the Baltic worldview and the linguistic heritage of the Lithuanian, Latvian and other languages and as well as for his translations from Latvian and other languages and outstanding international projects on modern poetry"
2018	Gundega Repše	Latvia	"for the idea and concept of the historical novel series "Us. Latvia. XX century", the curating of the publication of 13 novels in the series, as well as for the novel "Bogene" as one of the novels in the series"
2019	Leelo Tungal	Estonia	"for her autobiographic trilogy "Comrade Kid" (Tänapäev, 2018), with a special emphasis on the last book of the series "A Woman's Touch" (Tänapäev, 2018), where Stalin's era is depicted through the eyes of a child"
2020	Birutė Jonuškaitė	Lithuania	"for her novel cycle "Maranta" and "Maestro", which belong with the long, branched-out texts that weave numerous storylines and created detailed characters, which possess the versatility and depth of the classic canon, and which raise the language to the appropriate heights also for the hefty book of conversations "Laikas ir likimai" ("Time and Destiny")"
2021	Vahur Afanasjev	Estonia	"for his novel "Serafima ja Bogdan" ("Serafima and Bogdan", published in 2017)"
2022	Kai Aareleid	Estonia	"for her novel "Vaikne ookean" ("Pacific Ocean", published in 2021)"
2023	Antanas A. Jonynas	Lithuania	"for the collection of sonnets Naujieji sonetai"
2024	Rein Raud	Estonia	"for his novel "Katkurong" ("The Plague Train," 2023)"
2025	Tomas Venclova	Lithuania	"for his latest book of poetry "Už Onos ir Bernardinų""

== List of recipients of the Baltic Assembly Prize for the Arts ==
The following list is based on the official webpage of the Baltic Assembly.

Year	Recipient of the award	Country	Rationale
1994	Eimuntas Nekrošius	Lithuania	"for his stage productions of recent years (in particular plays by Chekhov, Shakespeare, Pushkin, Gogol)"
1995	Peeter Mudist	Estonia	"for paintings of the past two years"
1996	Pēteris Vasks	Latvia	"for his Concerto for Cello and Symphony Orchestra, string music "Quasi una sonata" with piano solo, Third String Quartet and music for three poems of Czeslaw Milosz for a vocal group"
1997	Gidons Krēmers	Latvia	"for promoting the musical culture of the Baltic States throughout the world"
1998	Erkki-Sven Tüür	Estonia	"for the musical creativity during the past three years"
1999	Mindaugas Bauzys	Lithuania	"for the roles during the past three years which have revealed him as an artist-creator"
2000	Veljo Tormis	Estonia	"for his compositions during the past three years"
2001	Ilmars Blumbergs	Latvia	"for his creative achievements and originality of style presented in the set designs for Mozart's "The Magic Flute" and the exhibition "Windows""
2002	Biruta Baumane	Latvia	"for her professional achievements demonstrated at a large-scale solo exhibition at the exhibition hall "Arsenāls" in 2002 and for her rich contribution to the development of painting, as well as for her autobiographical book "I Am Living" (2002)"
2003	Jaan Toomik	Estonia	"for his creative work as artist and organiser of art activities in recent years"
2004	Mindaugas Navakas	Lithuania	"for promoting art processes in the Baltic States"
2005	Vilnius String Quartet	Lithuania	"for their particular understanding of cultural mission, consistent work and broad scope of their undertakings"
2006	Andres Tali	Estonia	"for his works that touch existential problems of human life, and in the shallowness and rush of today's world find time and place for the most human questions of loneliness and relations, truth and lie"
2007	Silvija Radzobe	Latvia	"for her contribution to preparing the book "Theatre Production in the Baltic States" (2006), namely, for initiating, managing and executing this project"
2008	Petras Vyšniauskas	Lithuania	"for the presentation of the Baltic Jazz in the world, fruitful and intensive activity, important to the stage of Baltic Jazz and other genres, work comprising concert tours, teaching, recording and the preparation of various projects"
2009	Marko Mäetamm	Estonia	"for his high professional and successful exhibitions and achievements of the last years on the Baltic and international scene"
2010	Antanas Žukauskas	Lithuania	"for professionally communicating the past values in fine art, striking the right balance between the modern and the traditional, and for promoting the Baltic identity in the world"
2011	Andris Nelsons	Latvia	"for his outstanding achievements in promoting the performing arts and creating a positive image of Latvia and the Baltic States in the world"
2012	Visible Solutions LLC	Estonia	"for the artistic achievements in integrating Estonian, Latvian and Lithuanian art scenes into one arena of discussion"
2013	Peeter Vähi	Estonia	"for composing the Oratorio „Maria Magdalena", 2011, that is composed on gospel texts in original Coptic language"
2014	Alvis Hermanis	Latvia	"for his creative directorial achievements conducting numerous theatre plays and particularly theatre play "Oblomow", 2011"
2015	Modestas Pitrėnas	Lithuania	"for his creative endeavours to advance the idea of interaction amongst the cultures of all the three Baltic States and to further their cultural promotion on the European and global scale by conducting numerous plays and concerts in performance venues and theatres in Latvia, Lithuania and Estonia"
2016	Kristijonas Vildžiūnas	Lithuania	"for his film "Seneca's Day", which is the first Estonian-Latvian-Lithuanian co-production project (2016)"
2017	Laima Slava	Latvia	"for the excellent professional contribution to the theory development of the art science, as well as for the outstanding achievement in the book publishing sector, especially in publishing of art books, which significantly have enriched the current cultural landscape and furthermore foster the international recognition of Latvian culture"
2018	Jurgita Dronina	Lithuania	"for her impressive performances on the greatest stages of the world"
2019	Normunds Šnē	Latvia	"the performance at the concert in honour of 100-year anniversary of the Baltic states in the prominent Baltic Sea Festival in Stockholm's Berwaldhallen on August 28, 2018, with Sinfonietta Rīga and Tallinn Chamber Orchestra"
2020	Kristīne Briede and Audrius Stonys	Latvia; Lithuania	"for meditative documentary essay "Bridges of Time" (2018), which was co-produced by Lithuanian, Latvian and Estonian studios and portrays the less-remembered generation of cinema poets of the Baltic New Wave"
2021	Ginta Gerharde-Upeniece	Latvia	"for the direction of the international exhibition project "Wild Souls. Symbolism in the Art of the Baltic States""
2022	Šarūnas Sauka	Lithuania	"for his phantasmagorical nightmare visions and hallucinations, which are rooted in reality, fed by biblical and literary visual images of hell, paradise, and purgatory, which have evolved through the history of fine arts"
2023	Peeter Laurits	Estonia	"for his outstanding and versatile work as an artist and for his project Biotoopia"
2024	Dāvis Sīmanis	Latvia	"for the film "Maria's Silence," a Latvian-Lithuanian co-production and Berlin International Film Festival award winner"
2025	Kaspars Putniņš	Latvia	"for his performance with the Latvian Radio Choir in the concert program "The Dream Stream", held within the framework of the Baltic Music Days on 31 March 2023 in the Great Hall of the Jāzeps Vītols Latvian Academy of Music"

== List of recipients of the Baltic Assembly Prize for Science ==
The following list is based on the official webpage of the Baltic Assembly.

Year	Recipient of the award	Country	Rationale
1994	Andris Caune	Latvia	"for research series on the history of Riga conducted in 1991-1994"
1995	Juozas Kulys	Lithuania	"for his research series on biochemistry and biophysics"
1996	Juhan Maiste	Estonia	"for research series on "The Classical Tradition in Estonian Art: 1530-1830""
1997	Rimute Rimantiene	Lithuania	"for archaeological investigations on the history and art of the Baltic States"
1998	Jānis Krastiņš	Latvia	"for his achievements in researching Riga's Art Nouveau architecture"
1999	Janina Kursite	Latvia	"for the publications during the past three years and a monograph on the mythical elements in Baltic folklore, literature and art"
2000	Silvestras Gaiziunas	Lithuania	"for his scholarly work and activity in developing cultural ties among Baltic, Scandinavian and European nations"
2001	Raimo Pullat	Estonia	"for his research works dealing with the history of Estonia, the Baltic States and towns in the 18th century and in 1917-1941"
2002	Algirdas Gaizutis	Lithuania	"for his significant contribution to art research and a book of essays "A Glance" (2001)"
2003	Elita Grosmane	Latvia	"for her comprehensive scholarly monograph "Baroque Sculpture of Kurzeme: 1660-1740""
2004	Arvo Krikmann	Estonia	"for his empirical research on the cognitive theory of figurative language "The Contribution of Contemporary Theory of Metaphor to Paremiology" and for presenting a theoretical concept relating to the developments in the theory of metaphor"
2005	Evalds Mugurevics	Latvia	"for his research on the medieval chronicles about Livonia"
2006	Gediminas Valkiūnas	Lithuania	"for the monograph "Avian Malaria Parasites and Other Haemosporidia" and activities towards consolidation of links between parasitologists in the Baltic States and Scandinavian countries"
2007	Tarmo Soomere	Estonia	"for his cycle of researches on analyses of ship waves in the Baltic Sea as a source of danger to the coastal environment"
2008	Lembit Vaba	Estonia	"for researcher of the Baltic Sea language space, of the ancient Baltic loan words in Baltic-Finnish languages. He has compiled the English-Estonian-Latvian-Lithuanian-Russian Dictionary (2005), mapped the Estonian-Latvian language border and rediscovered Estonian language enclaves in southern regions of Latvia"
2009	Leonardas Sauka	Lithuania	"for his „Eglė Žalčių Karalienė" (en. Eglė, Queen of Adders), the fundamental study into the folklore heritage of Lithuania, Latvia, Estonia, and other countries (Vol. 1-4, Vilnius: LLTI, 2007-2008). The study strengthens the Baltic identity and enhances pride in the traditions of all the Baltic nations"
2010	Jānis Stradiņš	Latvia	"for his book "The Beginnings of Science and Higher Education in Latvia" (2009)"
2011	Andres Ilmar Kasekamp	Estonia	"for his volume "History of the Baltic States" (2010)"
2012	Algis Petras Piskarskas	Lithuania	"for his pioneering research in the field of laser physics and nonlinear optics, for development of innovative laser instruments and fruitful international collaboration in European area and world-wide"
2013	Renāte Blumberga	Latvia	"for the research carried out using both archive materials and information gathered on expeditions on the topic of the history and cultural history of the Liv people, the second titular nationality of Latvia"
2014	Vidas Gražulevičius	Lithuania	"for his achievements in materials chemistry and engineering, for the active collaboration with the scientific partners from the Baltic States initiating and implementing research projects"
2015	Eva-Clarita Pettai and Vello Pettai	Estonia	"for their monograph "Transitional and Retrospective Justice in the Baltic States""
2016	Maija Dambrova	Latvia	"for her scientific work on energy metabolism and her contribution to research of the mechanisms of action of the metabolic drug meldonium"
2017	Andres Metspalu	Estonia	"for his innovative, diverse and lasting contribution to gene technology and molecular diagnostic"
2018	Els Heinsalu	Estonia	"for her significant contribution in the theory of complex systems and stochastic processes"
2019	Jūras Banys	Lithuania	"for his outstanding contribution to research and innovations in ferroelectricity and phase transition as well as his devout leadership and professional scientific achievements"
2020	Roberts Eglītis	Latvia	"for work cycle: "Theoretical predictions of new materials for energy storage and harvesting"
2021	Virginijus Šikšnys	Lithuania	"for exceptional achievements in biomedical sciences – pioneering research in CRISPR-Cas9 Genome editing"
2022	Gustavs Strenga, Andris Levāns, Renāte Berga, and Laura Kreigere-Liepiņa	Latvia	"for the collective monograph "Rīgas jezuītu kolēģijas grāmatu krājuma (1583–1621) katalogs: Krājuma vēsture un rekonstrukcija", ("Catalogue of the Riga Jesuit College Book Collection (1583–1621): History and Reconstruction of the Collection") (2021)
2023	Arnolds Laimonis Klotiņš	Latvia	"for two monographs exploring Latvian music life and creativity during and after World War II"
2024	Limas Kupčinskas	Lithuania	"for his significant contributions to clinical and fundamental research in the field of digestive and liver diseases"
2025	Eva Piirimäe	Estonia	"for her monograph "Herder and Enlightenment Politics"

== See also ==
- List of European art awards
