= Bubnys =

- Lithuanian surname
- m.: Bubnys
- f.: (unmarried): Bubnytė
- f.: (married): Bubnienė

Bubnys is a Lithuanian surname. Notable people with the surname include:

- Arūnas Bubnys, Lithuanian historian and archivist
- Vytautas Bubnys (1932–2021), Lithuanian politician
