= Raimonds Tiguls =

Latvian musician, composer, and producer

- Born: 5 December 1972 (age 53); Talsi, Latvian SSR (now Latvia)
- Occupations: Musician, composer, producer
- Instruments: Synthesizer, piano, vocal
- Years active: 1999–present
- Website: raimondstiguls.com

Raimonds Tiguls (born 5 December 1972 in Talsi, Latvian SSR) is a Latvian ambient and electronic musician, composer, and producer.

== Career ==
He has received multiple Annual Latvian Music Recording Awards. In 2003, his album Bay Lounge also won the prize for Best Instrumental, Film or Theatre Musical Album. In 2006, his album Zils. Balts. Zaļš. won the prize for Best Contemporary Folk Music Album, as well as Best Instrumental, Film or Theatre Musical Album. He is credited as the main planner and organiser of concerts at Tiguļkalns in Talsi with international guest performers.

Two of Tiguls' songs – Lec, saulīte!, with lyrics by Rasa Bugavičute-Pēce, and Dod, dieviņi!, with lyrics by Nora Ikstena – have been performed at the closing concert of the Latvian Song and Dance Festival.

He wrote the musical score for the 2023 historical drama film Soviet Milk (Mātes piens).

== Discography ==
=== Albums ===
- Moonlight sound design (1999)
- Don't turn away (2001)
- De angelis (2001; together with the Schola Cantorum Riga)
- Bay Lounge (2003)
- Zaļš. Balts. Zils (2006)
- Vēstule Ziemassvētkos (2009)
- Carmina (2011)
- Islands (2012)
- Vaira. Saules Dainas (2016; together with Vaira Vīķe-Freiberga)
