= Juris Kronbergs =

Latvian-Swedish poet and translator (1946–2020)

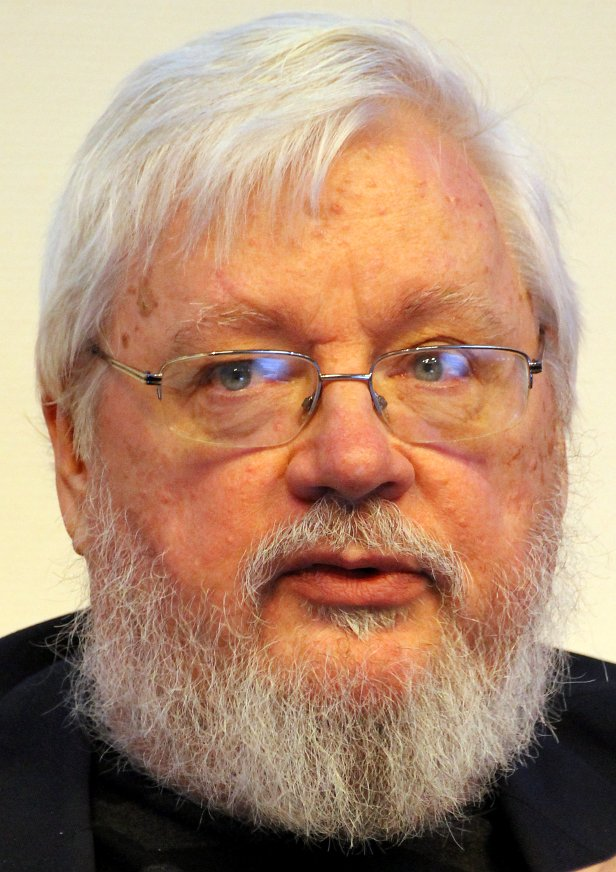
- 2013 photo
- Born: 9 August 1946; Stockholm, Sweden
- Died: 6 July 2020 (aged 73); Stockholm, Sweden
- Occupations: Poet and translator
- Writing career
- Genre: Poetry
- Notable work: Vilks vienacis (1996)

Juris Kronbergs (9 August 1946 – 6 July 2020) was a Latvian-Swedish poet and translator who lived in Stockholm.

In Latvia, he is best known for his poetry, written in Latvian. His most acknowledged book is Vilks vienacis (Wolf One-Eye, 1996), which has been published in Swedish, English and Estonian. In Sweden, Kronbergs was the most prolific translator of Latvian literature into Swedish. Since the late 1970s, he translated numerous volumes of poetry and fiction by Imants Ziedonis, Vizma Belševica, Knuts Skujenieks, Uldis Bērziņš, Sandra Kalniete, Jānis Elsbergs, Edvīns Raups, Inguna Jansone and other authors, as well as an anthology of Latvian poetry and a selection of Latvian folk-songs.

During the 1990s Kronbergs worked as a cultural attaché in the Latvian embassy in Stockholm.

== Bibliography ==
Juris Kronbergs, the son of painter Rūdolfs Kronbergs, was born in Stockholm, Sweden. He wrote poetry in both Swedish and Latvian, translating between the two languages.

In the second half of the seventies, he played drums in the Latvian bands Brothers of the Son (Saules Brāļi), Horsefly (Dundurs), and wrote poetry with the psychedelic rock group Ensemble of Cockroaches (Prusaku ansamblis).

In 1998, he was awarded the Order of Three Stars by the Republic of Latvia. In 2007 he received the Annual Award for Literature for his significant contribution to Latvian literature, and in 2016 was nominated for the poetry prize for his collection "Uz balkona/Bet ja visu laiku..."

After his death in 2020, he was awarded a lifetime achievement award by the World Society of Free Latvians PBLA.

=== Poetry ===
- Pazemes dzeja [dzejlapa]. Stockholm, 1970.
- Iesnas un citi dzejoļi. Kopenhāgena: Imanta, 1971.
- Biszāles. Stokholma: Daugava, 1976.
- De närvarande [Klātesošie; in Swedish]. Stockholm: Norstedt & Söners Förlag, 1984.
- Tagadnes. Stokholma: Daugava, 1990.
- Laiks [with Uldi Bērziņu]. Rīga: Zinātne, 1994.
- Varg Enögd/Vilks Vienacis. Rīga: Minerva, 1996.
- Notikumu apvārsnis. Rīga: Jumava, 2002.
- Rudens mani raksta. Rīga: Valters un Rapa, 2005.
- Peti-šu. Rīga: Neputns, 2005.
- Vilks Vienacis [2. edition]. Rīga: Mansards, 2008.
- Ik diena. Rīga: Mansards, 2011.
- Uz balkona/Bet ja visu laiku... Rīga: Dienas grāmata, 2016.

=== Juvenile books ===
- Mākoņu grāmata. R.: Liels un mazs (2010)
- The Book of Clouds. Trans. Richard O'Brien. The Emma Press (2018)

=== Selected works ===
- Par īstenību, četrām sāpēm un bezizejas istabu. R.: Artava (1989)
- Mana latviskā ikdiena/ dzeja. Rīga (1994)
- Trimdas anatomija / Dzejoļu izlase 1970–1991; Dzejoļi ārpus krājumiem. R.: Mansards (2009)

=== Books in other languages ===
- De närvarande [Klātesošie; in Swedish]. Stockholm: Norstedt & Söners Förlag, 1984.
- Wolf One-Eye [Vilks Vienacis; English trans. by Māra Rozīte]. Todmorden: Arc Publications, 2006.
- Maa-alune luule [dzejas izlase; Estonian trans.]. Loomingu Raamatukogu, 2007.
- Vilkas Vienakis [Vilks Vienacis; Lithuanian trans. by Vladas Braziūnas]. Vilnius: Kronta, 2008.
- Loup Borgne [Vilks Vienacis; French trans.]. Buchet Chastel, 2010.
- The Book of Clouds [Mākoņu grāmata; English trans.]. The Emma Press, 2018.
- [Mākoņu grāmata] [Corean trans.]. Totobook, 2018.
- Wilk Jedno Oko [Vilks Vienacis; Polish trans. by Olga Anna Wiewiora]. Lublin: Warsztaty Kultury, 2021.

=== Translations into Latvian ===
- Frick L. Vai aļņi ēd suņus? [from Swedish, juvenile book]. Stockholm: Atvase (1983)
- Mani zviedri [mūsdienu zviedru dzejnieku izlase, sast. un tulk. ]. R.: Nordik (2000)
- Eriksons U. Stikla cilvēki [from Swedish,]. R.: Jāņa Rozes apgāds (2010)
- Transtremers T. Dzeja [from Swedish, with Godiņš G.]. R.: Mansards (2011)
- Andersons K. Laimīgs cilvēks [from Swedish, with Godiņš G.]. R.: Mansards (2012)
- Bergrēns T. Intifada [from Swedish, with Godiņš G.]. R.: Mansards (2013)
- Frostensone K. Plūdu laiks [from Swedish, with Godiņš G.]. R.: Mansards (2013)
- Junsons A. Reidž [from Swedish, with Godiņš G.]. R.: Mansards (2013)
- Lundkviste M. Mirušo grāmata [from Swedish, with Godiņš G.]. R.: Mansards (2013)
- Sonnevi J. Mazas skaņas; viena balss [from Swedish, with Godiņš G.]. R.: Mansards (2013)

=== Translations into Swedish ===
Juris Kronbergs translated poetry, prose and other works of many Latvian writers into Swedish.

Grāmatās iznākušas daudzu latviešu autoru dzejoļu izlases — pārstāvēti Vizma Belševica, Knuts Skujenieks, Imants Ziedonis, Aleksandrs Čaks, Edvīns Raups, Jānis Elsbergs, Inguna Jansone, Guntars Godiņš, Dzintars Sodums un citi autori.

=== Other works ===
- Dvēsele uz grīdas. LP/ Prusaku Ansamblis (J. K. lasa pāris savu dzejoļu) (1974)
- Vilks Vienacis. CD/ K. Graša mūzika (2003)
- Varg Enögd. CD/ K. Graša mūzika (2004)
