= Skujenieks =

Skujenieks, feminine: Skujeniece is a Latvian surname literally meaning "shoemaker". Notable people with the surname include:

- Knuts Skujenieks (1936–2022), Latvian poet, journalist, and translator
- Marģers Skujenieks (1886–1941), Prime Minister of Latvia
