= Aivars Kalējs =

Latvian composer, organist and pianist

- Born: April 22, 1951 (age 75); Riga, Soviet Union
- Genres: Classical music
- Occupations: Organist, composer, pianist, improviser, musicologist
- Instruments: Organ, piano
- Labels: Bärenreiter, Edition Peters, Formblitz, Eres Edition, Musica Baltica, Melodiya, Riga Recording Company, Latvian Radio, Ritonis
- Website: aivarskalejs.webs.com

Aivars Kalējs (April 22, 1951, Riga, Latvian SSR) is a Latvian composer, organist and pianist.

== Career ==
Aivars Kalējs has written more than 100 opuses of symphonic, organ, piano, chamber and choir music. His works have won several composition awards, e.g. symphonic work "Musica Dolente" - dedicated to the victims of the tragic events of September 11, 2001. His works are included in many CD's of the great musicians and collectives such as Iveta Apkalna, Andris Nelsons, Maxim Novikov and Latvian National Symphony Orchestra. In 2017, Vita Kalnciema released retrospective CD Flashes of Aivars Kalējs organ music recorded in Riga Cathedral.

Aivars Kalējs is a concert organist at the Dome Cathedral in Riga and chief organist for the New St. Gertrudes Lutheran Church. He has performed solo recitals, included participating in dozens of important international organ festivals, and toured with various ensembles throughout North America, Colombia, almost all European countries, and Asia, including prestigious venues as Notre Dame de Paris (only Latvian who had three recitals there), Musikverein, West Point Military Academy Cadet Chapel with largest pipe organ in the world. Kalējs is known as an enthusiast in search of undervalued works by famous composer and music by forgotten composers. Up to 2004, he has recorded six solo CDs and participated in 34 CD recordings, including as chief organist for the Riga Dome Boys' Choir.

Kalējs has worked with such musicians as conductors Andris Nelsons, Māris Sirmais, Andres Mustonen, Pierre Cao, Sigvards Kļava, Normunds Šnē, Imants Kokars, Andris Veismanis and Tovy Lifshitz, violinists Gidon Kremer, Valdis Zariņš and Elina Buksha, violist Maxim Novikov, cellist Alexander Kniazev, Eleonora Testeļeca, pianist Polina Osetinskaya, singers Inese Galante, Inga Kalna, Inga Šļubovska-Kancēviča, Kristīne Gailīte, Ieva Parša, Martina Doehring, Lina Mkrtchyan, Egils Siliņš, Jānis Sproģis, Ingus Pētersons, Rustam Yavaev, Sergejs Jēgers, flutists Dita Krenberga and Ilze Urbāne, oboe player Uldis Urbāns, saxophonist Artis Sīmanis and Riga Saxophone Quartet, such collectives as Kremerata Baltica, State Choir Latvija, Latvian Radio Choir, Chamber Choir AVE SOL, Choir Kamēr and many national symphony orchestras. Kalējs has led vocal ensemble Dardedze (1971-1991) and he has been piano accompanist in Leonīds Vīgners chamber choir and choir Mūza.

From 1980 to 1985, he worked on the monument board at the Latvian Ministry of Culture’s, focusing on research of the organs of Latvian churches, and accomplishing the addition of 250 organs to the index of protected cultural monuments. Aivars Kalējs’ writings about organ history can be read in music lexicons and periodicals.

He studied under Ādolfs Skulte, Nikolajs Vanadziņš and Lūcija Garūta.

== Works ==
- List of compositions by Aivars Kalējs

Selected works for symphony orchestra by Aivars Kalējs

- Musica dolente, dedicated to the innocent victims of the tragic events of September 11, 2001
- De profundis

Selected works for chamber music by Aivars Kalējs

- Songs of Innocence, for chamber choir, flute and organ, poetry by William Blake
- Fugue on the Chorale Ein Feste Burg ist unser Gott and Blues, for saxophone quartet and organ
- Spiritual evening songs, for tenor, alto-saxophone and organ
- Ave Maria for voice and keyboard
- Viator Dei, for French horn/viola/cello and organ/piano
- Toccata, for violin solo
- Vēja dziesma (Wind Song), for flute and piano
- Piano cycle French Album, op. 55 dedicated to eleven French composers - J.P. Rameau, E. Satie, G. Fauré, C. Debussy, M. Ravel, F. Poulenc, O. Messiaen, M. Legrand, J. Alain, L. Boulanger and F. Lai (1997)
- Le stagioni per sotto voce (Seasons in an Undertone), for piano

Selected works for organ by Aivars Kalējs

- Chorale Sonata
- Solitudinem faciunt, in memory of victims in Zolitūde shopping centre roof collapse
- Toccata on the Chorale Allein Gott in der Höh sei Ehr
- Toccata in C, for organ duo
- Per aspera ad astra
- Via dolorosa
- Lux aeterna, Lux aeterna II,
- Perpetuum mobile
- Prayer
