= Arvo Krikmann =

Estonian folklorist, academician

Arvo Krikmann (21 July 1939 – 27 February 2017) was an Estonian academician, folklorist, linguist, paremiologist, and humour researcher. He may be best known as a proverb scholar, “one of the leading paremiologists in the world.”

Krikman was born in Pudivere, Lääne-Viru County. He graduated from Tartu University’s Department of Estonian Philology in 1962. He stayed on there till 1969 as a researcher at the Literary Museum in Tartu. From 1970-1972, he did postgraduate studies there, then went on to work as a researcher at the Institute of Language and Literature, then the Institute of Estonian Language, and finally at the Estonian Literary Museum. He was part of the Tartu Paremiology Group, a group of scholar that did major work on not only Estonian proverbs, but cooperated on comparative work with other proverb scholars in the Balto-Finnic area, led by Matti Kuusi. He also worked with Matti Kuusi on the ‘’Proverbia Septentrionalia. 900 Balto-Finnic proverb types with Russian, Baltic, German, and Scandinavian Parallels’’ (1985). Also, he and Ingrid Sarv assembled the five-volume Estonian proverb collection ‘‘Eesti vanasõnad’’ (1980-1988).

Krikmann has published many dozen items on proverb study. Since his native Estonia was under Soviet domination for much of his academic life, Krikmann’s access to proverb publications and outside scholars from outside of the Soviet shadow was limited.

Academically, he was named “professor extraordinary” at Tartu University in 1992, then in 1997 was named to the Estonian Academy of Sciences. He was awarded the Order of the White Star, 3rd degree. In 2004, he was the winner of the Baltic Assembly Prize for Science. He has also been named to multiple boards and committees. Krikmann was honored by the 2014 volume of Proverbium dedicated to him as a Festschrift. He was honored by a symposium held in his honor in 2014. It was titled “Scala naturae: Symposium in honour of Arvo Krikmann’s 75th birthday” and was held at the Estonian Academy of Sciences in Tallinn.
