= Alberts Bels =

Latvian writer (1938–2024)

- Born: Jānis Cīrulis; 6 October 1938; Ropaži parish, Latvia
- Died: 11 June 2024 (aged 85)
- Writing career
- Language: Latvian
- Years active: 1963–2024
- Genre: Prose
- Notable awards: Order of the Three Stars

Alberts Bels (born Jānis Cīrulis; 6 October 1938 - 11 June 2024) was a Latvian writer and novelist. Among his most well-known works are the novels Izmeklētājs (The Investigator), Būris (The Cage), which is adapted into a film, Bezmiegs (Insomnia), Cilvēki laivās (People in Boats), and Saucēja balss (The Caller’s Voice), which explore human psychology, moral choices, and life in Latvian society.

Bels was born in Jaunmežplepji, Ropaži parish. During Latvia’s National Awakening, Bels served as a deputy in the Supreme Council of the Republic of Latvia, where he supported and voted for the restoration of Latvia’s independence. He was named an honorary member of the Latvian Academy of Sciences (1999).

== Biography ==
Alberts Bels studied electrical engineering during the 1950s and also attended the Moscow Circus Art School. From 1963 he was active as a full-time writer. His first novel was published in 1967. His work has been described as psychologically rich fiction and several of his books have been adapted into films. He was also politically active and one of his novels was censored by the Soviet authorities during the 1960s.

== Awards and recognition ==
Alberts Bels received numerous honours in recognition of his contribution to Latvian literature and public life. He was awarded the Andrejs Upīša Prize in 1977 for his novel Saucēja balss and later received the Latvian SSR State Prize for Cilvēki laivās, recognising his significance in Soviet-era Latvian prose. He was also granted the title of People’s Cultural Worker of the Latvian SSR and awarded the Order of the Badge of Honour for his literary achievements. He was a member of the Supreme Council of the Republic of Latvia and was awarded the Commemorative Medal for Participants of the Barricades of 1991, an award given to those who participated in the confrontation with Soviet forces in 1991 known as The Barricades. After the restoration of Latvia’s independence, Bels continued to receive national recognition; he became an honorary member of the Latvian Academy of Sciences in 1999 and was appointed a Commander of the Order of the Three Stars in 2000. He later received the Annual Latvian Literary Award for lifetime achievement and, in 2023, was honoured with the Cabinet of Ministers Award and the President’s Certificate of Appreciation for his outstanding contribution to Latvian literature and to the restoration of Latvia’s independence.

== Politics ==
Like many latvian authors, Alberts Bels also became involved in political life during the late 1980s, when many Latvian intellectuals took part in the movement for national independence. In 1990, he was elected as a deputy of the Supreme Council of the Republic of Latvia. As a member of the Supreme Council, he participated in legislative work connected with democratic reforms, and on 4 May 1990 voted in favour of the Declaration on the Restoration of Independence from the Soviet Union. Before and during this period, Bels also took part in public events linked to the independence movement. In 1988 he was among the cultural figures who participated in raising the Latvian national flag at Riga Castle during the early stages of the National Awakening. After Latvia’s transition to independence he gradually returned to focusing primarily on literary work and public cultural life.

== Death ==
Alberts Bels died on 11 June 2024 in Riga at the age of 85. His passing was widely reported in Latvian media and followed by funeral services in Riga, where colleagues, cultural figures, and readers gathered to pay tribute to his life and work.

== Works ==
Novels

- Izmeklētājs (1967)
- Bezmiegs (written in 1967, published in 1987)
- Būris (1972)
- Saucēja balss (1973)
- Poligons (1977)
- Saknes (1982)
- Slēptuve (1986)
- Sitiens ar teļādu (1987)
- Cilvēki laivās (1987)
- Saulē mērktie (1995)
- Melnā zīme (1996)
- Latviešu labirints (1998)
- Uguns atspīdumi uz olu čaumalām (2000)
- Vientulība masu sarīkojumos (2005)

Short stories

- "Spēles ar nažiem" (1966)
- "Es pats līdzenumā" (1968)
- "Sainis" (1980)

Translation of works into other languages

- Uurija [Izmeklētājs, translated into Estonian by Ita Saks]. Tallinn: Perioodika, 1969.
- Vyšetřovatel [Izmeklētājs, translated into Czech by Vojtěch Gaja]. Praha: Práce, 1970.
- Puur [Būris, translated into Estonian by Ita Saks]. Tallinn: Eesti Raamat, 1974.
- Häkki [Būris, translated into Finnish by Martti Rauhala]. Karisto, 1976.
- Klec [Būris, translated into Czech by Vojtěch Gaja]. Praha: Svoboda, 1976.
- Deckname: "Karlsons" [Saucēja balss, translated into German by Welta Ehlert]. Berlin: Volk und Welt, 1976.
- Голос зовущего: романы [Būris; Izmeklētājs; Saucēja balss, translated into Russian by Сергей Цебаковский]. Москва: Известия, 1979.
- Клетка; Полигон [Būris; Poligons, translated into Russian by Сергей Цебаковский]. Москва: Сов. писатель, 1979.
- Polügoon [Poligons, translated into Estonian by Valli Helde]. Tallinn: Eesti Raamat, 1979.
- The Voice Of The Herald; The Investigator [Saucēja balss; Izmeklētājs, translated into English by David Foreman]. Moscow: Progress Publishers, 1980.
- Vyšetřovatel; Klec; Střelnice [Izmeklētājs; Būris; Poligons, translated into Czech by Vojtěch Gaja and Vladimír Novotný]. Praha: Odeon, 1981.
- Hlas volajícího: výbor próz [Saucēja balss: prozas izlase, translated into Czech by Vojtěch Gaja]. Praha: Svoboda, 1981.
- Hüüdja hääl [Saucēja balss, translated into Estonian by Lembit Vaba and Mari Vaba]. Tallinn: Eesti Raamat, 1981.
- Cuşca; Poligonul [Būris; Poligons, translated into Romanian by Natalia Stănescu]. Bucureşti: Univers, 1986.
- Klitka [Būris, translated into Ukrainian]. Kijiva: Dnipro, 1986. Tainik; Korni [Slēptuve; Saknes, translated into Russian]. Москва: Сов. писатель, 1987.
- Люди в лодках; Голос зовущего; Клетка; Бессонница [Cilvēki laivās; Saucēja balss; Būris; Bezmiegs, translated into Russian by Сергей Цебаковский and Юрий Абызов]. Рига: Лиесма, 1987.
- Juured [Saknes, translated into Estonian by Lembit Vaba and Mari Vaba]. Tallinn: Eesti Raamat, 1987.
- Šauklio balsas; Slėptuvė [Saucēja balss; Slēptuve, translated into Lithuanian by R. Zajančkauskaite]. Vilnius: Vaga, 1988.
- The Cage [Būris, translated into English by Ojārs Krātiņš]. Peter Owen Publishers, 1990.
- Ihmiset veneissa [Cilvēki laivās, translated into Finnish]. Helsinki: Orient Ekspress, 1992.
- Žmones valtyse; Nemiga [Cilvēki laivās; Bezmiegs, translated into Lithuanian by Arvydas Valionis]. Vilnius: Lietuvos rašytoju s-gos l-kla, 1992.
- Nespavost [Bezmiegs, translated into Czech]. Lubor Kasal, 2006.
- Insomnia [Bezmiegs, translated into English by Jayde Will]. Parthian Books, 2019.
- The Cage [Būris, translated into English by Ojārs Krātiņš]. Peter Owen Publishers, 2020.
- La Jaula [Būris, translated into Spanish by Rafael Martín Calvo]. Automática Editorial, 2024.
- أرق [Būris, translated into Arabic by Habiba Wael]. Jusur Publishing House, 2024.

Screenplays and film adaptations

- 1974: Wrote the screenplay Pagrabs.
- 1974: Wrote the screenplay for the film Uzbrukums slepenpolicijai.
- 1983: The film Šāviens mežā was produced based on motifs from his novel.
- 1993: The film Būris was adapted from his novel.
