= Leonardas Sauka =

Lithuanian academician (1931–2022)

Leonardas Sauka (5 January 1931 – 17 October 2022) was a Lithuanian folklorist, linguist, translator, and academician of the Lithuanian Academy of Sciences (1996).

== Awards ==
- 2001: Jonas Basanavičius Award (lt)
- 2005: Lithuanian Science Award
- 2009: Baltic Assembly Prize for Science
