= Judita Vaičiūnaitė =

Lithuanian writer

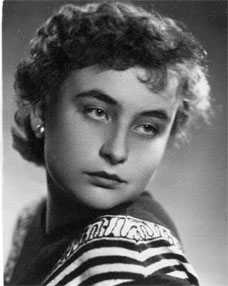
- Born: July 12, 1937; Kaunas, Lithuania
- Died: February 11, 2001 (aged 63); Vilnius, Lithuania
- Education: Vilnius University
- Occupation: Poet
- Spouse: Hermanis Marģers Majevskis
- Writing career
- Subjects: Mythology, Vilnius, the lives of women

Judita Vaičiūnaitė (July 12, 1937 – February 11, 2001) was a Lithuanian writer. Best known for her poetic exploration of urban settings and mythological women, she is one of Lithuania's most famous 20th-century poets.

== Early life and education ==
Judita Vaičiūnaitė was born in 1937 in Kaunas, Lithuania. Her father was a professor of psychiatry, and her mother was a nurse. She was particularly close with her sister Dalia.

After World War II, she moved to Vilnius with her family. There, she studied at Vilnius University, graduating in 1959. Vaičiūnaitė would live in Vilnius for the rest of her life, making the city a central subject of her work.

She was married to the famous Latvian poet and translator Hermanis Margeris Majevskis.

== Career ==
Vaičiūnaitė's first poetry collection, Pavasario akvarelės ("Spring Watercolors"), was published in 1960. She went on to publish new collections frequently, producing more than 20 books of poetry. She also wrote fairy tales and poems for children.

Vaičiūnaitė worked as an editor for several literary journals in Lithuania. She also completed translations of other poets into Lithuanian, notably the work of Anna Akhmatova. In 1978, she was named the laureate of the Lithuanian Poetry Spring festival.

In 1996, she was awarded the Baltic Assembly Prize for Literature, the Arts and Science for her collection Žemynos vainikai ("Wreaths of Zemyna"). That year, she published the memoir Vaikystės veidrody, a series of essays about her own life. She was issued the Order of the Lithuanian Grand Duke Gediminas in 1997, and the Lithuanian Writers' Union Prize in 2000.

== Writing ==
Vaičiūnaitė's poetry dealt with a wide range of subjects and themes, including Lithuanian and Greek mythology, modern jazz, history, and contemporary city life. Her urban-centered poetry, frequently set in Vilnius' Old Town, is perhaps her best known. It came at a time when most other Lithuanian poets were from the countryside and focused on the natural world in their work. She also incorporated the city's multicultural history into her poems.

She frequently employed dramatic monologue in her work, often from the point of view of female historical and mythological figures. Her poetry was influenced by the neo-romantic work of Salomėja Nėris, the first prominent Lithuanian woman poet. Alongside Marcelijus Martinaitis, Sigitas Geda, and others, she was part of a generation that quietly revolutionized Lithuanian poetry as dissatisfaction grew with Soviet rule, but the neo-romantic strains persisted.

Vaičiūnaitė was a highly independent single mother, but she was also convinced of the importance of romantic love. She wrote with a feminist realism, narrating the lives of single women in the city.

== Death and legacy ==
Judita Vaičiūnaitė died in Vilnius in 2001. A 2010 posthumous collection of selections from her work, Kristalas: Poezijos Rinktinė, was published by the Lithuanian Writers' Union. In 2018, a collection of her work in English translation was published as Vagabond Sun: Selected Poems.

A monument to her stands near the Church of St. Catherine in Vilnius.

== Selected works ==
=== Poetry ===
- Pavasario akvarelės (1960)
- Kaip žalias vynas (1962)
- Per saulėtą gaublį (1964)
- Vėtrungės (1966)
- Po šiaurės herbais (1968)
- Žiemos lietus (1987)
- Žemynos vainikai (1995)
- Seno paveikslo šviesa (1998)
- Debesų arka (2000)
- Kristalas: Poezijos Rinktinė (posthumous, 2010)

=== Plays ===
- Pavasario fleita (collection, 1980)

=== Memoir ===
- Vaikystės veidrody (1996)
