= Māris Bērziņš =

Latvian writer and playwright

- Born: December 7, 1962; Rīga, Latvia
- Occupations: Writer, playwright

Māris Bērziņš (born 7 December 1962, in Riga, Latvia) is a Latvian writer and playwright.

== Biography ==
Māris Bērziņš was born on 7 December 1962, in Riga. After graduating from the University of Latvia, he pursued a career as a civil servant before devoting himself fully to writing. His first novel, Ērika Trauma sapnis (The Dream of Ēriks Traums), was published in 2003. He then wrote numerous short stories for the satire magazine Dadzis. In 2007, his collection of short stories, Gūtenmorgens, was published, featuring a main character who continually finds himself in funny and absurd situations, and was critically acclaimed. In 2008, he published the children's book Resnais svešinieks (The Big Stranger). He also proved himself as a playwright with Imagine: Three Plays including the plays Nobody Smokes Here, The Cabinet Dog and Imagine which won the Literature of the Year Prize for best dramatic work in 2009.

In 2015, he was awarded the Baltic Assembly Prize for Literature for the novel Svina garša (The Taste of Lead), which tells about the time of the Nazi occupation in Latvia.

In 2016, Linda Olte adapted his Gūtenmorgens for the screen as part of the "One Village – All of Latvia" project, initiated for the centenary of the Latvian state. In 2017, he published Gūtenmorgens. Second Time, the sequel to his successful book.

In 2018, the publishing house Dienas Grāmata launched the I Am series, in which 12 contemporary writers would each create their own biographical novel about one of 12 classics of Latvian literature. Initially, Bērziņš was slated to write about Jānis Poruks or Anšlavs Eglītis, but he was later offered the project of writing about Vilis Lācis, a Latvian novelist and politician from the Soviet era. After finishing Forbidden Piano in the spring of 2019, he began reading Lācis's works, testimonies, letters, and diaries. In 2021, his novel The Blacksmith of the Future, dedicated to Lācis, was published.

== Works ==
=== Novels ===
- Ērika Trauma sapnis. Rīga: Pētergailis, 2003.
- Titāna skrūves. Rīga: Dienas grāmata, 2011.
- Sveiks, Dzintar Mihail!. Rīga: Dienas grāmata, 2013.
- Svina garša. Rīga: Dienas grāmata, 2015.
- Aizliegtais pianīns. Rīga: Dienas grāmata, 2019.
- Nākotnes kalējs. Rīga: Dienas grāmata, 2021.

=== Short stories ===
- Gūtenmorgens. Rīga: Karogs, 2007.
- Resnais svešinieks [story for children]. Rīga: Liels un mazs, 2008.
- Gūtenmorgens otrreiz. Rīga: Dienas grāmata, 2017.
- Gūtenmorgens pirm'reiz. Rīga: Dienas grāmata, 2017.

=== Screenplays ===
- Iztēlojies: trīs lugas. Rīga: Mansards, 2009.
