= Imants Lešinskis =

Latvian former KGB agent and double agent for the CIA

- Born: Imants Lešinskis; 1931; Riga, Latvia
- Died: 1985 (aged 53–54)
- Occupation: spy
- Spouse: Rasma Lešinska
- Children: Ieva Lešinska
- Espionage activity
- Allegiance: Soviet Union
- Service years: 1956–1978
- Rank: Major of the KGB
- Codename: Ivar
- Other work: Peter Dorn

Imants Lešinskis (17 December 1931 – 23 December 1985) was a Latvian KGB agent and a double agent for the CIA who defected from the Soviet Union to the United States with his wife and daughter in 1978 while working for the United Nations in New York City. His daughter, Ieva Lešinska, made a film about her relationship with her father called My Father the Spy. His work in the KGB mainly consisted of denouncing and defaming, both domestically and abroad, those Latvians perceived as anti-Soviet.

== Biography ==
Lešinskis was born in 1931, in Riga, Latvia.

In 1956, Lešinskis was blackmailed into joining the KGB as an informant. In 1960, during the 1960 Summer Olympics, under the cover of working for a newspaper called the Homeland Voice, he was tasked with contacting Latvian athletes on the Australian Olympic Team, but he instead approached the American embassy in Rome seeking political asylum. His request was turned down, but he was offered a job working as a CIA informant, which he accepted.

In 1976, Lešinskis and his wife, Rasma, were posted in New York City as part of the Soviet mission to the United Nations, with Lešinskis working as a translator. On September 3, 1978, while still posted in New York City, he and his family defected to the West by driving themselves to Washington, D.C., and turning themselves in to the United States Department of State. After Lešinskis' defection, Kofi Annan, who would later serve as the Secretary-General of the United Nations, sent him a letter asking why he failed to show up to his UN post.

In 1982, Lešinskis testified in a court case, Kairys v. I.N.S., that a man named Liudas Kairys worked at the Treblinka extermination camp during World War II for the SS. Kairys claimed that the evidence was fabricated by the Soviet Union and Lešinskis told the court that the Soviets had done so in other cases, without commenting on the specific case.

Lešinskis died in 1985.
