= Rasa Bugavičute-Pēce =

Latvian playwright and author

- Born: Rasa Bugavičute; 25 January 1988 (age 38); Riga, Latvia
- Education: Latvian Academy of Culture, University of Liepāja
- Writing career
- Notable awards: Jānis Baltvilks Award
- Website: www.rasaraksta.lv

Rasa Bugavičute-Pēce (born 25 January 1988 in Riga, Latvia) is a Latvian playwright and writer.

== Life and career ==
Bugavičute-Pēce received her primary schooling at the Riga French Lyceum before going on to study at the Latvian Academy of Culture, graduating in 2011 with a bachelor's degree in Theatre, Film and TV Drama. In 2013 she received a magister degree in Culture Management, also from the Academy of Culture. The same year she received a second magister degree, in Writing Studies, from the University of Liepāja.

In 2011, Bugavičute-Pēce was elected chair of the Latvian Playwrights' Guild, serving until 2015. Since 2015 she has been a playwright at the Liepāja Theatre. Her works have also been performed at multiple other theatres, including the Latvian National Theatre, the Dailes Theatre, and the Dirty Deal Teatro.

Bugavičute-Pēce is the author of two novels: Mans vārds ir Klimpa, un man patīk viss (My Name is Klimpa and I Like Everything) from 2016, and Puika, kurš redzēja tumsā (The Boy Who Saw in the Dark). The latter brought her the Jānis Baltvilks Award for children's literature in July 2020. The song Lec, saulīte!, with lyrics by Bugavičute-Pēce and accompanying music by Raimonds Tiguls, was performed at the closing concert of the 2018 Latvian Song and Dance Festival.

== Personal life ==
Bugavičute-Pēce is married to Sandis Pēcis, an actor at the Liepāja Theatre. They have two children.
