= Jaan Toomik =

Estonian artist (born 1961)

Jaan Toomik (born 2 October 1961 in Tartu) is an Estonian video artist, painter and award-winning filmmaker, often described as the most widely acknowledged Estonian contemporary artist on the international scene.

== Status ==
In the Estonian art world Toomik received recognition as a painter from the late 1980s and from the early 1990s as an installation and video artist. The critics often refer to him internationally as the most well-known contemporary artist from Estonia mainly due to his short video works that have received wide international acclaim (e.g. Father and Son, 1998). He has participated at the São Paulo Biennale (1994), ARS ‘95 (1995), Manifesta 1 (1996), Venice Biennale (1997; 2003), 4th berlin biennial of contemporary art (2006), etc.
Currently he is represented by Temnikova & Kasela Gallery.

== Biography and art ==
Toomik was born on October 2, 1961 in Tartu, Estonia (then: Estonian Soviet Socialist Republic). His father died in 1971, when he was 9 years old, leaving him and his older brother to the care of their mother who was a doctor. Toomik remembers that some time in his late puberty, he became a highly sensitive young man, only taking an interest in philosophy and the beautiful arts. After graduating from secondary school in Haapsalu town in 1980, he joined the Soviet army for two years, as every male citizen of the Estonian SSR back then had to. From 1981 to 1983 he served his military service near Volgograd in Russia, guarding a huge bomb warehouse and loading ammunition onto the trains bound for Afghanistan, but also drawing dozens and dozens of portraits of his fellow soldiers.

Shortly after his army experience, Toomik enrolled in the art academy in Tallinn, where between 1985 and 1991 he studied in the faculty of painting. Some large-scale paintings with openly Neo-Expressionist brushwork have survived from that time (e.g. Menstruation, 1989; Dancer, 1990). The artist described himself as being heavily influenced by Jorge Luis Borges in those days: “the perception of identity was different during the Soviet era. /…/ We all lived in some other world. Even geographically we transferred ourselves somewhere else. /…/ However, during the Singing Revolution (1988) you started to identify with this land and nation.” A good example could be Toomik's temporal installation Bed 75 (1993), located in the centre of Tallinn for one month, which consisted of 75 iron beds, bought by the artist from the Russian military bases – then still located all around the newly independent Estonia. Through painting, Toomik had gradually found his way to performance art and then to installation art and site-specific art, actually abandoning painting altogether, albeit for a short period of time. His interest in installations marks an important move in his professional career. An art historian, artist and curator Hanno Soans has even suggested that “many of Toomik's fans among foreign curators have not properly digested his early development story, the way the Neo-Expressionist painter converted himself to a modern Post-Conceptual installation and video artist.”

The start of his international career was somewhat “symptomatic” to an artist from post-Berlin Wall generation. Estonia regained its independence in 1991; Jaan Toomik has participated in different international art events since 1993. During the first part of the 1990s, he began to create simple conceptual actions that he usually videotaped. A performance and installation video Way to São Paulo (1994) prepared the background for Toomik's eventual breakthrough on the international art scene. First presented in 1994 in Brazil at the São Paulo Biennale, it depicted a peculiar cube mirror floating on three rivers in Tartu, Prague and São Paulo – all cities geographically on the same line. This was followed by Dancing Home (1995), first presented at ARS ’95 in Kiasma, Helsinki, where the casually dressed artist is seen on the rear deck of a ferry dancing to the hypnotic rhythm of the engines (indirectly echoing the Estonia cruise ferry disaster that occurred on 28 September 1994). In 1997, Toomik represented Estonia at La Biennale di Venezia with another of his site-specific installations, a “view corridor” made of bottomless/topless coffins. With Truck (1997), he projected a bright sunny video image taken from the highway in the San Antonio, Texas, desert onto the back of a truck driving from Tartu to Tallinn in the darkness of the autumn night. The 200 km drive on the trail of the “video-mobile” was documented from the following car. Among other things, on the video documentation of this work, Sirje Helme (then the director of Estonia’s Contemporary Art Centre) can be briefly seen explaining the art project to the traffic police.

In 1998 Toomik’s most celebrated video Father and Son was completed and first presented at City Gallery in Tallinn. In this short video (2 minutes, 35 seconds) the artist is skating naked across the icy cold Baltic Sea, continuously circling the viewer. Accompanied by a religious choral sung by his ten-year-old son, he finally disappears into the white radiance from which he came. The video belongs to numerous collections (Art Museum of Estonia; Courtesy Nicole Trussardi Foundation; Erika Hoffmann collection, Berlin; Stedeljik Museum, Amsterdam; Moderna Museet, Stockholm; Ludwig Museum, Budapest) and all authorized copies are sold. More than a decade later it was still circulated in prestigious international contemporary art events (e. g. 4th berlin biennial of contemporary art, Berlin, 2006; Ostalgia at New Museum, NYC, 2011) and the artist frequently receives requests from different collectors and institutions about the possibility of acquiring a copy.

Toomik has had more than twenty noteworthy solo exhibitions at different venues around the world since 1997, and is considered one of the few contemporary Estonian artists who can be discussed from two distinct angles – the domestic approach and the international reception. For example, the video, Untitled (Man) (2001), displays a certain homage to the themes related to Vienna Actionism, which were important to Toomik in the late 1980s and early 1990s. It shows a man (an amateur actor and performance artist Alar Sudak a.k.a. Elaan) in the middle of the muddy field whose genitals are tied to a stake or a rod through a long piece of white bandage, making him look “castrated”. It is also one of the earliest examples in Toomik’s video art when he turns the camera away from himself and experiments with documentary approach. Peeter and Mart (2001) is a dialogue between two artists, a discreet, yet honest interview with a painter (Peeter Mudist) suffering from Parkinson’s disease. Invisible Pearls (2004), made in collaboration with Jaan Paavle and Risto Laius, is really a short documentary film about ex-convicts who have free-willingly gone through genital mutilation. Liina (2003) and Jaanika (2007) also vividly demonstrate the documentary side of Toomik’s art, which contrasts with his usual artistic signature – universally laconic, short video images and sounds such as Jaan (2001) or Waterfall (2005).

However, in most cases Toomik’s video pieces have a deeply personal background and explanation, as in the case of Untitled (2002). It’s a documentation of a performance dedicated to his deceased brother. In the video, the artist falls freely from a height of 9 meters as if diving or jumping into water, but instead of water it is the earth that “swallows” the artist. Dancing with Dad (2003) is executed in a similar vein: the artist is dancing on the grave of his father, whom he never had the chance to dance with in reality because of his father’s early death. Tellingly, Toomik shares his full name with his father who was also Jaan Toomik.

The motive of cycle within the family bloodline often reoccurs in Toomik’s art. By entitling his short film piece Father and Son 2 in 2007 (not perhaps without a certain sense of self-irony), the artist makes a reference to his “hit” video Father and Son from 1998. The camera captures the artist when he's driving his car and appears to be screaming behind the wheel. Like in 1998, the voice of the artist's son is used in the soundtrack of the piece but this time it's a newborn baby, whose loud cries are juxtaposed by the abrupt “tantrums” of his middle-aged father.

Jaan Toomik continues to live in Tallinn, Estonia, and in the 2000s he has worked at the Estonian Academy of Arts as a professor in the Chair of Interdisciplinary Arts and as a Head of Department of Painting. In 2005, he received the Konrad Mägi Medallion – once-in-a-lifetime award and considered quite prestigious, especially among painters – from the Estonian Artists' Association. As Toomik is considered to be primarily a video artist internationally, his paintings have been received with greater enthusiasm in Estonia than abroad. According to art historian, Eha Komissarov, “these works by Toomik provide a good example of the influence of the manipulation of the body that characterises his video art. They include a self-portrait of the artist /…/, accommodate both the origin of the interpretation of aggressively psychoanalytical surrealism and the story of that generation.”

== From art to (art) film ==
Another change occurred in Toomik's artistic strategy when his solo exhibitions took place at Kumu Art Museum in Tallinn in 2007. Alongside his newest paintings and video works, it featured his first attempt as a filmmaker: a short film Communion (2007, 12 min) shot with a 35 mm camera. His long-time friend and (sort of) alter ego Alar Sudak plays the protagonist of the film where almost no dialogue is used and atmosphere of Toomik's earlier video installations is clearly present. This short film proved to be successful: Communion received jury's special award at the 54th International Short Film Festival Oberhausen and in 2011 it was screened at Centre Pompidou alongside works by Alexander Sokurov, Zbigniew Rybczyński and Želimir Žilnik. In 2010 Toomik finished his second short film Oleg (2010, 20 min, 35 mm), a psychological story with a dark guilt-ridden atmosphere, which is based on his memories from the 1980s when he was in the Soviet Army. Toomik has also publicly expressed a desire to make a full-length feature, while still maintaining a passionate attitude towards painting and all kinds of interdisciplinary art practises.
