= Soviet Milk =

Latvian film from 2023

- Directed by: Ināra Kolmane
- Written by: Arvis Kolmanis
- Based on: Mātes piens by Nora Ikstena
- Produced by: Jānis Juhņēvičs; Marta Romanova-Jēkabsone
- Starring: Maija Doveika; Elīna Vaska-Botere; Rūta Kronberga; Zane Bierande; Indra Briķe; Juris Lisners
- Edited by: Mihals Lanskis
- Music by: Raimonds Tiguls
- Production company: "Deviņi"
- Release date: February 1, 2023
- Running time: 112
- Country: Latvia
- Language: Latvian

Soviet Milk (Latvian: Mātes piens) is a 2023 Latvian historical drama film directed by Ināra Kolmane, based on the novel Mātes piens by Latvian writer Nora Ikstena. The film portrays a complex mother-daughter relationship in Latvia under Soviet occupation, exploring themes of repression, identity, intergenerational trauma, and female resilience. Directed by Ināra Kolmane with a screenplay by Arvis Kolmanis, Mātes piens was produced by Film Studio DEVIŅI with international collaborators and shot to authentically depict life in Soviet era Latvia. The film premiered on 1 February 2023 and received positive reviews and significant recognition in Latvia, including the Kilograms kultūras 2023 award in the category of Cinema.

== Plot ==
Set in Soviet-occupied Latvia, Soviet Milk follows the lives of a mother and daughter across several decades, from the aftermath of World War II to the late 1980s. The story centers on Astra, a young and promising doctor whose professional ambitions are curtailed by the Soviet regime. After returning from Leningrad, she is reassigned to a rural medical clinic, abandoning her scientific work. She takes her daughter Nora with her, who grows up in the countryside and attends a Soviet school while witnessing her mother’s psychological decline. As Nora matures, she becomes increasingly aware of the ideological pressures shaping her education and social environment. Influenced by family memory and personal experience, she gradually distances herself from official Soviet narratives and eventually participates in Latvia’s national awakening movement.

== Cast ==
- Maija Doveika — Astra
- Elīna Vaska-Botere — Astra (young)
- Madara Mazā — Astra (child)
- Rūta Kronberga — Nora
- Indra Briķe — Astra’s mother
- Inga Tropa — Astra’s mother (young)
- Zane Bierande — Jese
- Jānis Znotiņš — Astra’s father
- Juris Lisners — Astra’s stepfather
- Rihards Jakovels — Astra’s stepfather (young)

In episodic roles:

- Liene Beinaroviča — Astra’s teacher
- Kintija Stūre — Rūta
- Ritvars Logins — Rūta’s boyfriend
- Māris Skrodis — Man at the ball (Nora’s father)
- Juris Kalniņš — Professor
- Hermans Skučs — KGB officer
- Jekaterina Frolova — Serafima
- Gaļina Rosijska — Larisa Nikolajevna
- Guntis Berelis — Hippie in café
- Elīna Vāne — Rural school principal
- Madara Melne-Tomsone — Rural school teacher
- Gundars Grasbergs — KGB officer (countryside)
- Baiba Broka — Riga school principal
- Daiga Kažociņa — Riga school teacher
- Ģirts Krūmiņš — Teacher Blūms
- Anatolijs Fečins — Military training teacher
- Lauris Subatnieks — KGB officer (Riga)
- Artis Drozdovs — Doctor

== Production ==
The film was directed by Ināra Kolmane and written by Arvis Kolmanis. It was produced by Film Studio DEVIŅI as a Latvian–Belgian co-production in collaboration with Tet and Umedia. The project received financial support from the National Film Centre of Latvia and the EU Creative Europe MEDIA programme. Filming began on 15 September 2020 and took place primarily in Limbaži Municipality and Riga. Soviet-era trains provided by Latvijas Railways and Vivi (train transit) were used to recreate the period setting. Production design was led by Lithuanian artist Algirdas Garbačiauskas, cinematography by Rolandas Leonavičius, and costumes by Evija Džonsone, who sourced authentic garments from private collections.

== Themes and analysis ==
Critics have described Soviet Milk as a social and historical drama that focuses on women’s experience under Soviet rule. The film examines the psychological consequences of repression, including identity loss, fear, and emotional isolation. Astra’s character has been interpreted as representing collective trauma shaped by totalitarian control. Reviewers have noted that the film emphasizes the intrusion of political power into private life, particularly in relation to motherhood, professional identity, and bodily autonomy. The intergenerational transmission of memory is central to the narrative, especially through Nora’s informal education about Latvian history within the family. Some critics observed that while the historical setting frames the story, the primary focus remains the evolving relationship between mother and daughter.

== Release and reception ==
The film premiered nationally on 1 February 2023 at the Splendid Palace cinema in Riga. Soviet Milk became the most watched Latvian film of 2023 in domestic cinemas. Within two weeks of release, it attracted over 25,000 viewers, later surpassing 42,000 admissions. The film received the Audience Award at the Latvian National Film Award Lielais Kristaps and was recognized as the most attended film at Splendid Palace cinema in 2023. Critical responses highlighted Maija Doveika’s performance as Astra and Raimonds Tiguls’ musical score, while some reviewers commented on the literary quality of the dialogue, reflecting the film’s origins as a novel adaptation.

== Awards ==
In February 2024, the film received the public-voted Kilograms kultūras 2023 award in the Cinema category.
