= Peeter Mudist =

Estonian painter and sculptor

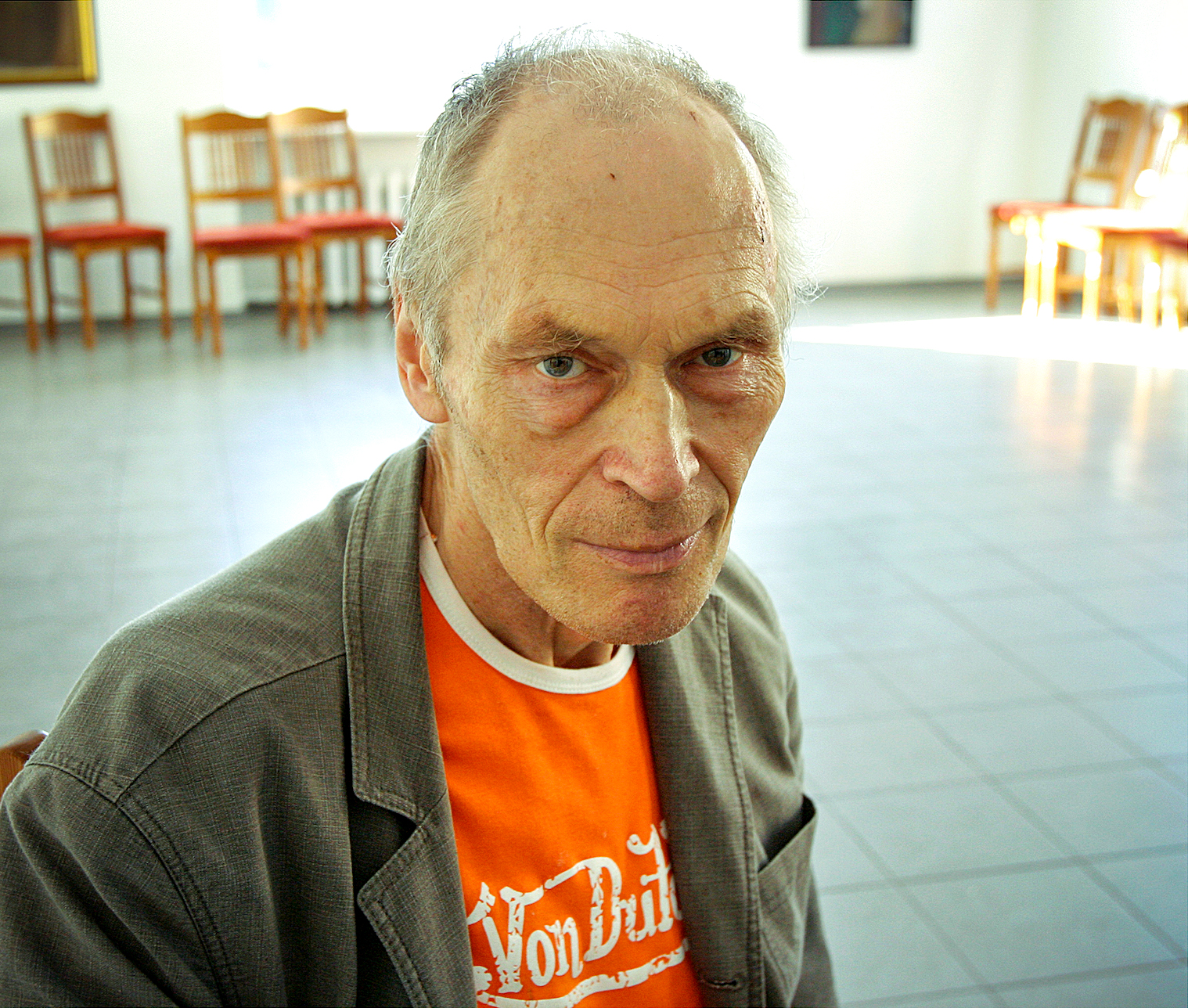
Peeter Mudist in 2004

Peeter Mudist (19 April 1942, Tallinn – 6 December 2013) was an Estonian painter, sculptor, and print-maker whose works have received multiple awards. He was also a member of the Estonian Artists' Union.

== Early life ==
Born in 1942, in Tallinn, Mudist studied painting at the Estonian State Art Institute (now, the Estonian Academy of Arts) for four years, starting in 1963.

== Later life and death ==
Mudist had Parkinson's disease in his later years. He died on the morning of 6 December 2013.

== Awards ==
- Baltic Assembly Prize for Literature, the Arts and Science (1995)
