= Nora Ikstena =

Latvian writer (1969–2026)

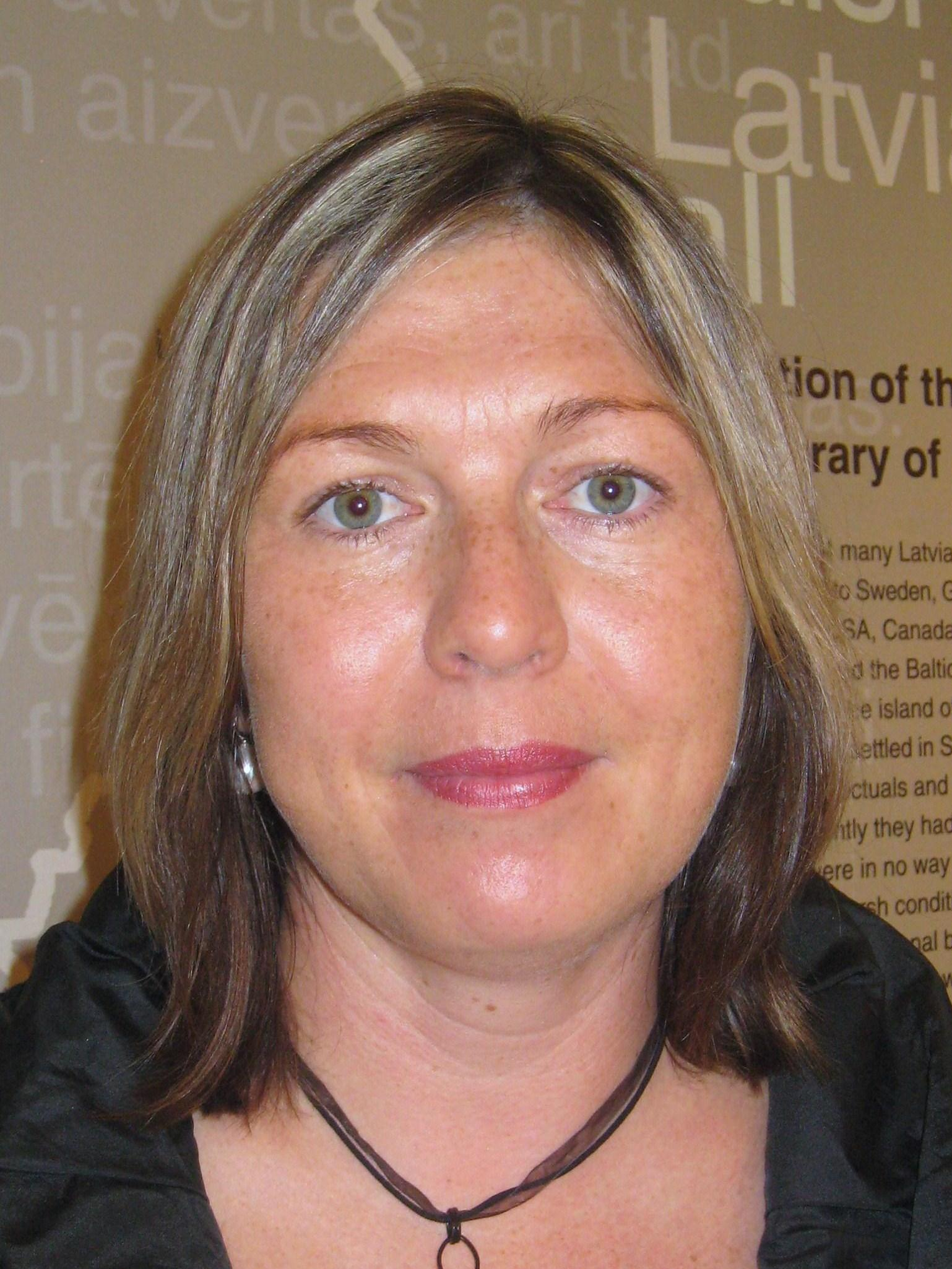
- Ikstena in 2008
- Born: Nora Rubene; 15 October 1969; Riga, Latvian SSR, Soviet Union
- Died: 4 January 2026 (aged 56)
- Education: University of Latvia (1987–1992), Columbia University (1994–1995)
- Occupation: Writer
- Years active: 1993–2026
- Notable work: Soviet Milk (novel) (2015)
- Spouse(s): Jānis Ikstens; Harijs Beķers
- Awards: Annual Latvian Literature Award (2001, 2006), Baltic Assembly Prize for Literature (2006), Order of the Three Stars (2008)

Nora Ikstena (née Rubene; 15 October 1969 – 4 January 2026) was a Latvian writer and cultural manager. She was born in Riga and studied Latvian philology at the University of Latvia. After a subsequent period of residence in New York City for further studies, she returned home and worked to establish the Latvian Literature Centre.

== Early life ==
Nora Ikstena was born on 15 October 1969, in Riga. Her mother was a doctor and her father an aviation engineer. She studied in several secondary schools in Riga and also Ikšķile. In 1987 she started Latvian philology studies at the University of Latvia. After graduating in 1992, she moved to the USA and in 1994 enrolled in Columbia University to study English language and literature.

After graduation she worked as an editor in several Latvian newspapers. While living in the USA, she became editor of Columbia University's "The Review of Contemporary Fiction" magazine. In 1998 she prepared a whole issue of the magazine about Latvian prose.

In the late 90s she was one of the founding members of the Latvian Literature centre and became its first chairman. Since 1998, she was one of the organizers of annual prose readings in Latvia.

== Career ==
Her debut novel Celebration of Life appeared in 1998, and she wrote more than twenty books thereafter, several novels, short story collections, biographies and essays.

Her 2015 novel Soviet Milk (novel) (Latvian: Mātes piens) was translated into English and published in 2018 by Peirene Press in London. The book tells the story of three generations of women growing up in Soviet-occupied Latvia, and how they cope with the lack of freedom. The launch took place on 7 March in the English-language bookstore Robert's Books in Riga. She also represented Latvia at the London Book Fair in 2018 as a featured author and was officially invited to be a participant of the Library of Congress National Book Festival of Washington D.C. in 2016. The book was shortlisted for the 2019 EBRD Literature Prize. Soviet Milk has been licensed for 15 foreign languages, among them translations in Italian and German. In September 2020, Ināra Kolmane began shooting a movie adaptation of Soviet Milk, which was released in 2023.

Ikstena was awarded the Baltic Assembly Prize for Literature in 2006, and in 2008 she was honoured with the Order of the Three Stars (officer) of the Republic of Latvia.

Later, in 2018, she was honoured with another national Excellence in Culture Award for being the internationally best-known Latvian writer of the 21st century.

== Death ==
Ikstena died after a serious illness on 4 January 2026, at the age of 56.
