= Vytautas Bubnys =

Lithuanian politician (1932–2021)

Vytautas Jurgis Bubnys (9 September 1932 – 24 April 2021) was a Lithuanian writer, political figure and a member of the Seimas.

== Biography ==
Bubnys was born to a peasant family in Čiudiškiai village, Prienai district, Lithuania on 9 September 1932. He studied in the Vilnius Pedagigical Institute, graduating in 1957 with a teaching degree in Lithuanian language and literature.

Between 1957 and 1966 Bubnys worked as a teacher. In 1966 he became the editor of magazine "Moksleivis" (School Student). Between 1976 and 1980 Bubnys worked at the Union of Lithuanian writers, later devoting all his time to writing.

Bubnys started publishing his writings in 1953. By 2012 he had written and published 32 books, some of them translated to other languages and adapted to movies. By his own estimate, a total of 6 million copies of his books have been published. He has received numerous awards for his writing, including the Order of the Lithuanian Grand Duke Gediminas. In 2003, he was awarded the Baltic Assembly Prize for Literature.

Bubnys was a member of the Communist Party of Lithuania until 1989. In the elections in 1992, Bloškys represented the Democratic Labour Party of Lithuania and was elected as the member of the Sixth Seimas in the single-seat constituency of Prienai (67).
