= Annual Latvian Literature Award =

Annual literary award in Latvia

- Native name: Latvijas Literatūras gada balva
- Awarded for: Latvian literature and translations into Latvian
- Country: Latvia
- First award: 2000
- Website: laligaba.lv/index.php/en/

The Annual Latvian Literature Award (Latvian: Latvijas Literatūras gada balva; LALIGABA), also referred to in English-language coverage as the Latvian Literature Award, is an annual literary award in Latvia. The current rules cover first publications of literary works issued in Latvia during a calendar year and provide core categories for poetry, prose, children's literature, translation into Latvian and debut writing. The jury may also add categories for literary research and drama, while lifetime-achievement and special awards are presented separately.

The organisers describe it as Latvia's most important literary award, and Latvian Public Media has treated it as a central annual event in the country's literary sector.

== History ==
The award's recipient record begins with works published in 2000. A 2013 retrospective by literary critic Ieva Kolmane traced the initiative for an annual award to the Latvian Writers' Union in 2001.

Following financial difficulties around the 2009 edition, the Writers' Union was joined in organising the award by the International Writers' and Translators' House and the Latvian Literature Centre, with support from the Ministry of Culture. The literature database Literatura.lv dates the adoption of the LALIGABA name to 2011. The current organising partnership consists of the Latvian Writers' Union, the International Writers' and Translators' House and the University of Latvia Institute of Literature, Folklore and Art.

In 2013, a design competition produced a book-shaped table lamp as the award object. It was created by Baiba Lindāne and Uģis Gailis of the design studio Mājo, with the book used as a symbol of light and literature's capacity to illuminate thought and understanding. The 2026 recipients received a redesigned award created by Dāniels Šatalovs.

The 2020 ceremony was adapted into a pre-recorded television programme during the COVID-19 pandemic, with the winners presented in a production of the literary television programme Literatūre.

== Format and evaluation ==
Candidates may be submitted by the organising institutions, publishers, creative associations, media organisations, universities, libraries and authors, or proposed by the award's expert panel. Under the 2024 regulations, the seven-member panel must include representatives of poetry, prose, translation and children's literature. Authors whose own work is entered, and publishing-house employees whose publisher has entered a work, are excluded from the panel; members also sign conflict-of-interest declarations.

The panel works from September to April, evaluates all submitted works, and may publish a longlist before choosing a shortlist. Four works are normally nominated in each core category, although the rules allow between two and five. The panel publishes written assessments of the nominated works and selects the category winners by secret ballot. The 2024 rules also exclude anonymous and artificial-intelligence-generated works from consideration.

The core categories are:

- best original poetry work in Latvian;
- best original prose work in Latvian;
- best original work of children's literature in Latvian;
- best translation of foreign literature into Latvian, which may be divided into poetry and prose translation;
- most promising literary debut in Latvian.

The panel may additionally award literary research and published drama. It also chooses a lifetime-achievement recipient and may present special prizes for work outside the core categories, including work in minority languages and contributions to translating or promoting Latvian literature abroad.

== Public programme ==
Public readings and media programmes have accompanied the award. In 2014, nominated poetry, prose and translation works were presented in public readings before the ceremony, and the event was streamed by Latvian Public Media. Radio and online coverage also use the shortlist as a basis for discussion of the previous year's literature and disagreements within the jury.

Recent editions have included a separate public vote organised with LSM.lv. The 2025 readers' award went to Dace Rukšāne, while the 2026 vote was won by Inese Ķestere.

== Selected editions ==
Because the ceremony is held in the following spring, an award year normally evaluates books published in the preceding calendar year.

Award year	Works submitted	Categories presented	Notes	Source
2013	74	5	First edition whose recipients received the LALIGABA lamp	
2023	113	7	Literary-research works returned as a category after a break	
2024	104	7	Entries included 18 prose works, 11 poetry collections, 20 children's works, 38 translations and 12 debuts	
2025	138	6	Submissions represented 26 publishers	
2026	156	8	Submissions represented 31 publishers; translation was divided into poetry and prose, and drama and literary research were awarded separately	

== Reception and discussion ==
Kolmane described an annual literary award as a form of professional criticism and a record of recent literary history. She also identified recurring questions about the treatment of literature written in languages other than Latvian, work in Latgalian or regional dialects, and books that did not fit established categories.

In 2023, jury members Ojārs Lāms and Ingmāra Balode said that the award made changes in Latvian literature more visible and enabled the jury to identify tendencies across more than one hundred submitted works. The 2025 jury likewise used the nomination process to discuss trends in poetry, prose, children's literature and translation, including the subjects that produced the strongest disagreements among the panel.
