= Linards Tauns =

Latvian writer (1922-1963)

- Born: 13 October 1922; Rīga, Latvia
- Died: 30 July 1963 (aged 40); New York City,
- Occupation: Poet

Linards Tauns (born Arnolds Mikus Bērzs-Bērziņš) (October 13, 1922 – July 30, 1963) was a Latvian writer. He was one of the immigrant artists who formed the Hell's Kitchen school of art among Latvian immigrants in New York City.

== Biography ==
Linards Tauns was born on October 13, 1922, in Riga, Latvia as Arnolds Mikus Bērzs-Bērziņš. He spent his childhood in Anniņmuiža neighbourhood in Riga. In 1944 he emigrated to Germany. In 1946 he published his first works in Latvian immigrant periodicals. In 1950 he emigrated to USA and settled in New York City. He worked in the typography and also as an editor in Latvian magazine Latviešu Žurnāls.

In 1950s he together with Gunārs Saliņš established so called Hell's Kitchen group of young Latvian immigrant modernist poets. Group was based in the Linards Tauns flat in Hell's Kitchen neighbourhood. It was a place for regular meetings, discussions and poetry. Only one collection of Linards Tauns poetry was published during his lifetime. It was Mūžīgais Mākonis (Eternal Cloud) in 1958. His second collection Laulības ar pilsētu (Marriage with the city) was published posthumously in 1964 and was edited by his friend Gunārs Saliņš.

Linards Tauns died on July 30, 1963, in the New York.

Edition of his Collected Poems in Latvian "Dzeja" was published in 2011.
