= Kārlis Vērdiņš =

Latvian poet (born 1979)

- Vērdiņš in 2026
- Born: 28 July 1979 (age 47); Riga, Latvia
- Education: Latvian Academy of Culture (B.A., M.A.); University of Latvia (Ph.D.); Washington University in St. Louis (Ph.D.)
- Occupation: Poet
- Employer: Art Academy of Latvia

Kārlis Vērdiņš (born 28 July 1979) is a Latvian poet.

== Biography ==
Vērdiņš grew up in Jelgava. He studied for his B.A. and M.A. in cultural theory at the Latvian Academy of Culture. In 2009, he received a doctoral degree in philology from the University of Latvia. In 2022, he graduated with a PhD in comparative literature from Washington University in St. Louis, USA.

Since 2007, he has worked at the Institute of Literature, Folklore and Art at the University of Latvia. Since 2022, he has been an assistant professor at the Art Academy of Latvia. Since 2026, he has taught Latvian as a language instructor at the University of Washington in Seattle, USA.

=== Writing ===
Vērdiņš is the author of many academic papers and essays on literature, both in Latvian and other languages.

He has published several volumes of poetry in Latvian: "Ledlauži" (Icebreakers, 2001, 2nd edition 2009), "Biezpiens ar krējumu" (Cottage Cheese with Sour Cream, 2004), "Es" (I, 2008), "Pieaugušie" (Adults, 2015), "Gatavā dzeja" (Ready-made poetry, 2020), "Lībiešu balādes" (Livonian ballads, 2023) and "Nekas" (Nothing, 2026) as well as children's books, "Burtiņu zupa" (Alphabet Soup, 2007), "Tētis" (Dad, 2016), "Dilles tante" (Aunt Dill, 2018) and "Jandāliņš" (Ruckus, 2023).

Vērdiņš has written librettos and song lyrics for composers such as Ēriks Ešenvalds, Andris Dzenītis, Gabriel Jackson, Kārlis Lācis, and has published translations of W. B. Yeats, T. S. Eliot, Joseph Brodsky, Walt Whitman, Charles Simic, Georg Trakl, Lev Rubinstein, Jacek Dehnel, Konstantin Biebl, Emily Dickinson and Lev Rubinstein among others. His own poetry has been translated in many languages: "Titry" (translated by Semen Khanin, in Russian, 2003), "Niosłem ci kanapeczkę" (translated by Jacek Dehnel, in Polish, 2009), "Já" (translated by Pavel Štoll, in Czech, 2013) and "Come to Me" (translated by Ieva Lešinska, in English, 2015), as well as poetry books in Spanish, French, Slovenian, Finnish, and Lithuanian.

His monograph "The Social and Political Dimensions of the Latvian Prose Poem" was published by Pisa University Press in 2010.

Vērdiņš has received prizes from the annual poetry festival in Latvia (2008) and from the newspaper "Diena" (2001 and 2008), as well as the annual Literature prize (for the best children's book of the year, 2008 and 2024; for the best poetry collection, 2016; for the best translation, 2018).

In 2012, he represented Latvia at the Poetry Parnassus festival – part of the Cultural Olympiad in London. His poem "Come to Me" was included in the list of the fifty greatest modern love poems, chosen by poetry specialists at the London's Southbank Centre in 2014.

In 2026, he was awarded the Baltic Assembly Prize for Literature for his poetry collection "Livonian Ballads" (with Valts Ernštreits).

A selection of Vērdiņš' poems, translated into English, was published by Arc Publications in 2015. When reviewing this book the poet and critic Gregory Woods wrote, "his first person is singularly hard to pin down, apparently detached while involved, precise while vague, inventing stuff while accurately recording memory. The voices he adopts comment wryly on a world in which nothing could surprise us, even while everything takes our breath away. The reader finds she has to check the ground beneath her feet.".
