= Pēters Brūveris =

Latvian writer and translator

- Born: April 24, 1957; Rīga, Latvian SSR (Now Latvia)
- Died: July 16, 2011 (aged 54); Ventspils, Latvia
- Occupations: Poet, translator

Pēters Brūveris (1957, Riga – 2011, Ventspils) was a Latvian writer and translator.

The first book by Brūveris was published in 1977. He wrote a total of ten collections of poetry and also children's books and lyrics for songs. Since 1988, Pēters Brūveris was a member of the Latvian Writers' Union and he worked for several years as an editor at various culture magazines. Apart from his own work, he translated poetry into Latvian, mainly but not exclusively from different parts of the former Soviet Union. He commanded a large number of languages including Russian, Turkish, Lithuanian, Gagauz, Ossetian, Crimean Tatar and Mordvinic.

During his lifetime, Pēters Brūveris was awarded several prizes, including the Baltic Assembly Prize for Literature
