= Gundega Repše =

Latvian writer (born 1960)

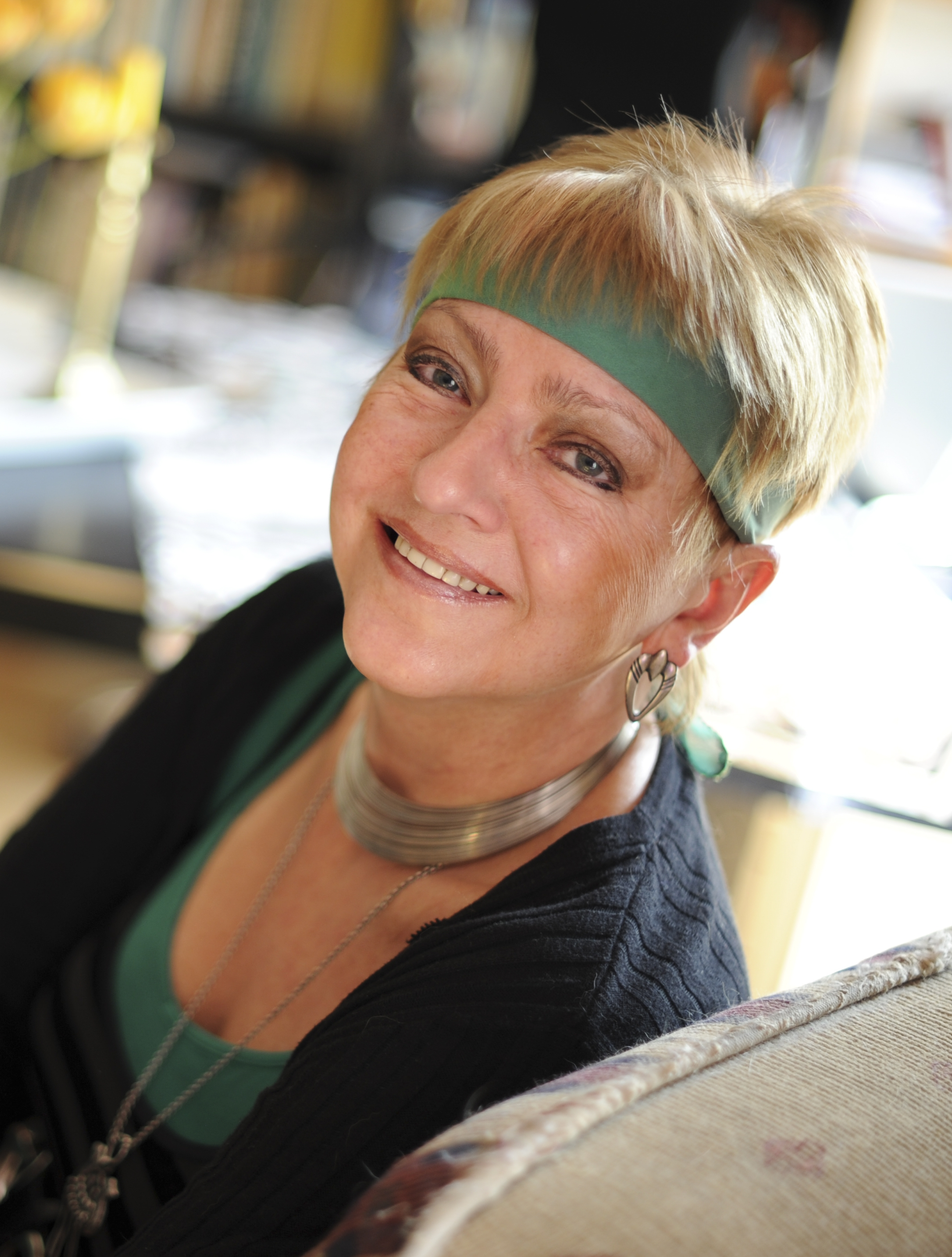
Image of Gundega Repše

Gundega Repše (born 13 January 1960, Riga) is a Latvian writer. She received the Annual Latvian Literature Award in 2000 for her novel Thumbelina (Īkstīte). In 2018, Repše was awarded the Baltic Assembly Literature Award.
