= Inga Gaile =

Latvian writer

- Gaile at the HeadRead festival in Estonia, 2019
- Born: 29 June 1976 (age 50); Riga, Latvian SSR
- Occupations: Writer, poet, playwright
- Years active: 1996–present

Inga Gaile (born 29 June 1976, in Riga, Latvia) is a Latvian poet, novelist, and playwright.

== Biography ==
Gaile has written poetry collections for adults and children. Her works often focus on feminist issues as well as issues related to different stigmatised groups. She has won the Latvian Literature Award and the Poetry Days Festival prize. Gaile has translated poetry from Russian into Latvian, and her poems have also been translated into various languages including English, Estonian, German, Swedish, Lithuanian, and Bengali. She is President of Latvia PEN.

== Activism ==
Gaile is a prominent member of the Latvian feminist movement and is a founder of the stand-up comedy group "Sieviešu stendaps/Women's Stand-Up".

== Works ==
=== Poetry ===
- Laiks bija iemīlējies (Time Had Grown Enamoured). Rīga: Pētergailis, 1999.
- Raudāt nedrīkst smieties (Cry Not Laugh). Rīga: Nordik, 2004.
- Kūku Marija (Maria, the Cake Killer). Rīga: Orbita, 2007
- Migla (Fog). Rīga: Mansards, 2012.
- Vai otrā grupa mani dzird? (Can the Back Row Hear Me?). Rīga: Liels un mazs, 2014.
- Lieldienas (Easter). Rīga: Neputns, 2018.
- Nakts (Night). Rīga: Mansards, 2021.

=== Prose ===
- Stikli (Glass Shards). Novel. Rīga: Dienas Grāmata, 2016.
- Neredzamie (Invisible). Novel. Rīga: Zvaigzne ABC, 2018.
- Piena ceļi (Milky ways). Stories. Rīga: Mansards, 2018.
- Skaistās (The Beauties). Novel. Rīga: Dienas grāmata, 2019.
- Rakstītāja (The Writer). Novel. Rīga: Dienas grāmata, 2020.

=== Plays ===
- Āda (Skin). Rīga: Dirty Deal Teatro, 2011.
- Mūsu Silvija debesīs (Our Sylvia, Who Art in Heaven). Rīga: Ģertrūdes ielas teātris, 2013.
- Trauki (The Dishes), in collaboration with Marta E. Martinsone. Rīga: Dirty Deal Teatro, 2014.

=== Works in translation ===
- 30 Questions People Don’t Ask: The Selected Poems of Inga Gaile. Translated in English by Ieva Lešinska. Warrensburg, Missouri: Pleiades Press; 2018. ISBN 9780997099423
- Klaas (Glass Shards). Translated into Estonian by Aive Mandel. Tallinn: Looming, 2018.

== Awards ==
- The Annual Latvian Literary Award for Can the Back Row Hear Me?, 2015.
- Prose Readings Award for the short story Piena ceļi/ Milky Ways, 2012.
- Latvju Teksti Magazine Award for Fog, 2012.
- Ojārs Vācietis Award for Fog, 2012.
- Poetry Days Award for Cake Mary, 2007.
- Ojārs Vācietis Award for Cry Not Laugh, 2004.
- Anna Dagda Foundation Award for Cry Not Laugh, 2004.
- Klāvs Elsbergs Award for Time Had Grown Enamoured, 1999.
