= Klāvs Elsbergs =

Latvian poet and translator (1959–1987)

- Born: 3 January 1959; Rīga, Latvian SSR (now Latvia)
- Died: 5 February 1987 (aged 28); Jūrmala, Latvian SSR (now Latvia)
- Education: University of Latvia
- Occupations: Poet; Translator
- Spouse: Irēna Auziņa

Klāvs Elsbergs (January 3, 1959 – February 5, 1987) was a Latvian poet and translator. He was the son of Latvian poet Vizma Belševica.

== Biography ==
Klāvs Elsbergs was born in Riga. His parents were Latvian poet Vizma Belševica and translator Zigurds Elsbergs. In 1977 he started French philology studies in the Latvian University. He graduated in 1982. He was a major translator of French poetry including a collection of poems by Guillaume Apollinaire. Elsbergs also has translated works of Kurt Vonnegut (Slaughterhouse-Five). Also he was one of the founding editors of Avots, an influential intellectual monthly that introduced avant garde and politically charged subjects during the period of Glasnost. In 1978 he married Latvian poet Irēna Auziņa.

Elsbergs was a leading poet of his generation and his poetry is still very popular in Latvia. He published two volumes of his poetry and one was published posthumously.

Klāvs Elsbergs died on February 5, 1987, in an accident after falling from the ninth floor of the Soviet Writer's Union building in Dubulti. His death is surrounded with rumours and there is even theory, that he was actually murdered.
