= Zigmunds Skujiņš =

Latvian writer and journalist (1926–2022)

- Born: 25 December 1926 Rīga, Latvia
- Died: 28 March 2022 (aged 95)
- Occupation: Writer, essayist
- Spouse: Valda Skujiņa (1929–2001)

Zigmunds Skujins (25 December 1926 – 29 March 2022) was a Latvian writer. He received numerous national and international literature awards and also Order of the Three Stars.

== Biography ==
Skujins was born in Riga into a relatively poor worker's family and was raised in Iļģuciems neighborhood. He studied in the local Spilve primary school which he graduated in spring 1940. After Latvian occupation by Soviet Union in June 1940 Skujiņš joined the Pioneer movement and together with Latvian youth delegation visited Moscow in the summer of 1940. Since 1941 Skujiņš studied in the building department of Riga State technical school. In August 1944 Skujiņš was drafted into the German army as a Luftwaffenhelfer. He was sent to Germany however he saw no action and in January 1945 was hospitalized in Lower Saxony. Later he was interned in the POW camp together with many Latvian Legion soldiers. Skujiņš was among those Latvian displaced persons who decided to return to soviet occupied Latvia in 1945.

After returning to Latvia he started working as a journalist working in both print and broadcast media. Also, he studied in the Janis Rozentāls Riga art school from 1945 until 1946. In 1946 he started to work in the newspaper Padomju Jaunatne (Soviet Youth) and became member of the Komsomol. He worked there until 1957. Later he worked in the satirical magazine Dadzis and since 1960 worked in the writers union of the Latvian SSR.

In 1980s he was one of the founders of the Latvian cultural foundation. In 1985 he was granted title Peoples writer of the Latvian SSR. He actively participated in the Third National awakening and joined the Latvian Popular Front in 1989.

His first short story appeared in 1948, and he has since published many novels and short story collections as well several collections of essays and memories. His work has often been adapted for stage and screen. He has also been translated in many European languages (English, French, German, Russian, Polish and many more). He was awarded the Order of the Three Stars in 2008 and prize for lifetime contribution in 2007.

He was married to Valda Skujiņa (1929–2001) and has a daughter Inga.

== Selected works ==
- Flesh-Coloured Dominoes (translated by Kaija Straumanis)
- A Man In His Prime
- The Bed with a Golden Leg (Gulta ar zelta kāju)
- Pietá: An Undocumentary Story
