= Imants Ziedonis =

Latvian poet

- Born: 3 May 1933; Sloka, Latvia
- Died: 27 February 2013 (aged 79); Rīga, Latvia
- Occupations: Poet, writer
- Spouse: Ausma Kantāne-Ziedone

Imants Ziedonis (3 May 1933 – 27 February 2013) was a Latvian poet and writer who first rose to fame during the Soviet era in Latvia.

== Early life and education ==
Ziedonis was born in Ragaciems fisherman's family. He was educated at the University of Latvia in Riga where he earned a degree in philology in 1959. He earned an additional degree in advanced literature in Moscow in 1964. As a young man, Ziedonis worked in a wide variety of jobs ranging from librarian to road construction worker and from teacher to literary editor.

== Career and literary works ==
Ziedonis published his first major collection of poetry 'Zemes un sapņu smilts' ('Sand of earth and dreams') in 1961. By the end of the decade, he had established himself as among the preeminent voices of Latvian literature through publishing three more important collections of poetry: 'Sirds dinamīts' (1963, 'Heart's Dynamite'), 'Motocikls' (1965, 'Motorcycle'), and 'Es ieeju sevī' (1968, 'I Enter Myself').

During the same period, Ziedonis began publishing work besides poetry. His 1965 Dzejnieka dienasgrāmata (1965, A Poet's Diary) and two years later his (1967, Along the Foamy Path) established his prose writing reputation as well. His reputation established, Ziedonis rose to become the chairman of the Writers' Union board and chairman of the Latvian Culture Foundation. Ziedonis considered defecting to the West but chose to remain in Latvia to preserve from what he perceived as Russian destruction the best of Latvian literature in the National Library.

In the 1970s Ziedonis became interested in the roots of Latvian folk culture. To this end, he built a house in the countryside outside the town of Murjāņi. The very act of building a house as private property was a defiant act in Latvia during the Soviet occupation, so the choice to do so was in some respects a political statement. Ziedonis, however, emphasized his desire to establish his roots with the countryside. There he wrote his three books of lyrical and ironic miniatures, "Epifānijas" ("Epiphanies", 1971, 1974, 1994), which can be identified as prose poetry. It was during this period that he began to collect and write folk tales and children's books. These included Krāsainās pasakas (1973, Colored Tales), Lāču pasaka (1976, Tales of Bears) and Blēņas un pasakas (1980, Twaddle and Tales). His children's book Kas tas ir — kolhozs? (1984, What is a Kolkhoz?) directly addressed the kolkhoz or Soviet collective farm in an era when the collective system was under increasing scrutiny in Latvia as elsewhere in the USSR.

Ziedonis maintained an odd balance between dissidence and acceptance in the Soviet occupation era. As one of the most open voices in poetry during the Soviet occupation era, he repeatedly risked appearing as a dissident to the Soviet leaders. A leading voice in the perestroika period toward the end of the Soviet occupation era, Ziedonis was an outspoken advocate of freer expression and the growth of the Latvian Cultural Fund. This was particularly evident in his first published collection of essays Garainis, kas veicina vārīšanos (1976, Steam That Promotes Boiling). At the same time, Ziedonis never fully broke with the Soviet authorities. Indeed, in 1977, the year following his inflammatory essays, the Soviet government awarded him the National Poet of Soviet Latvia prize.

Ziedonis was a prominent member of Atmoda, the re-awakening movement in Latvia, he was elected to the Supreme Council of the Republic of Latvia in 1990 and was one of the Supreme Council members who voted for the Declaration on the Restoration of Independence of Latvia.

== Awards and honors ==
Following Latvian independence from the Soviet Union, Ziedonis in 1995 was awarded the Order of the Three Stars, Latvia's highest honor for civic merit to the nation.

He has also been nominated for The Astrid Lindgren Memorial Award – the world's largest prize for children's literature.

He died in 2013. Ziedonis was held in highest esteem, indicated by the fact that the prime minister ordered the formation of a special committee for organization of the funeral. He is buried in Ragaciema Cemetery, Lapmezciema County, Engure Region.

The charity fund Viegli, created in 2010, to aid the realization of the ideas of Imants Ziedonis, has released first an album of songs with words by Ziedonis simply entitled Viegli (Easily). The second album, entitled Vakars (Evening), was released in 2011, and featured a number of different Latvian musicians. The stamp Imants Ziedonis Will Bloom Eternally was the winner in the stamp design contest organized in social networks by Latvijas Pasts and in 2014. It was realised by a graphic designer Andra Petersone, and the portrait of Ziedonis that is depicted on the stamp is based on the poet's photograph by Leonid Tugalev, which took the first place in an international photo contest in Spain in 1982.

== Bibliography ==
=== Poetry ===
- Zemes un sapņu smilts. R.: LVI (1961)
- Sirds dinamīts. R.: LVI (1963)
- Motocikls. R.: Liesma (1965)
- Es ieeju sevī. R.: Liesma (1968)
- Epifānijas/ pirmā grāmata. R.: Liesma (1971)
- Kā svece deg. R.: Liesma (1971)
- Epifānijas/ otrā grāmata. R.: Liesma (1974)
- Caurvējš. R.: Liesma (1975)
- Poēma par pienu. R.: Liesma (1977)
- Epifānijas/ pirmā un otrā grāmata. R.: Liesma (1978)
- Man labvēlīgā tumsā. R.: Liesma (1979)
- "Thoughtfully I Read the Smoke: Selected Poems" (parallel texts in Russian and English), Moscow: Progress Publishers (1980)
- Re, kā. R.: Liesma (1981)
- Viddivvārpa/ poēma grām. "Maize", kopā ar L. Damianu. R.: Liesma (1982)
- Flowers of Ice. Translated by Barry Callahan. Exile editions, Ltd. 1987.
- Taureņu uzbrukums. R.: Liesma (1988)
- Viegli. R.: Preses nams (1993)
- Mirkļi. Foreles. R.: Teātra Anekdotes (1993)
- Epifānijas/ trešā grāmata. R.: Preses nams (1994)
- Ceļa sentiments. R.: Nordik (2000)
- Trioletas. R.: Pētergailis (2003)

=== Folk and Children's Tales ===
- Krāsainās pasakas. R.: Liesma (1973)
- Lāču pasaka. R.: Liesma (1976)
- Blēņas un pasakas. R.: Liesma (1980)
- Kas tas ir — kolhozs? R.: Liesma (1984)
- Sākamgrāmata. R.: Liesma (1985)
- Pasaka par bizi. R.: Jumava (1997)

=== Other Writings ===
- Dzejnieka dienasgrāmata. R.: Liesma (1965)
- Pa putu ceļu. R.: Liesma (1967)
- Kurzemīte: 1. grāmata. R.: Liesma (1970)
- Perpendikulārā karote co-authored with Vitaly Korotiču. R.: Liesma (1972)
- Kurzemīte. Otrā grāmata. R.: Liesma (1974)
- Garainis, kas veicina vārīšanos. Raksti, runas, studijas. R.: Liesma (1976)
- Tik un tā. R.: Liesma (1985)
- Mūžības temperaments. R.: Liesma (1991)
- Tutepatās. R.: Karogs (1992)
- Ne tas kādam jāzina. R.: Pētergailis (2005)

== Citations and references ==
=== Cited sources and other sources ===
- Cedrins, Inara (2014). Butterfly Putsch.
- Ivaska, Astrīde (2001). All Birds Know This: Selected Contemporary Latvian Poetry. Writers' Union of Latvia. pp. 7–8, 217–219. ISBN 9984-720-06-3.
- Skujiņš, Z.; Silenieks, J. (Spring 1998). "Imants Ziedonis Opens Clocks". World Literature Today. 72 (2): 297–300. doi:10.2307/40153764. JSTOR 40153764.
