= Vizma Belševica =

Latvian poet and writer

- Vizma Belševica
- Born: May 30, 1931; Rīga, Latvia
- Died: August 6, 2005 (aged 74); Rīga, Latvia
- Occupations: Writer, poet, translator
- Partner: Zigurds Elsbergs
- Children: Klāvs Elsbergs

Vizma Belševica (May 30, 1931 – August 6, 2005) was a Latvian poet, writer, and translator. She was nominated for the Nobel Prize in Literature.

== Biography ==
Belševica was born in Riga. Her father, Žanis Belševics was a worker, and her mother Vera Belševica (maiden name Cīrule), was a housewife. The family was relatively poor, as only one of the two spouses did paid work. Vizma's father had drinking problems, which aggravated when he lost his job as a baker during the Great Depression. Vizma Belševica was born on May 30, 1931, in pre-war Riga, then the capital of democratic Latvia, where she spent most of her childhood. The city is often featured in her works, especially in her most famous work — the autobiographic trilogy "BILLE"—, but the time spent in Courland, on her relatives' small farm has also an important role in her poetry and writings. Her son Klāvs Elsbergs was a famous Latvian poet in the 1980s, and her second son Jānis is a writer as well.

== Recognition ==
Receiving the Nobel Prize was her childhood dream; she, as a poor but bright girl, spent much of her time reading classical literature. Belševica's work has been recognised: on December 6, 1990, she was elected honorary member of the Latvian Academy of Sciences; she has received the Spīdola Award, which is the highest recognition in Latvian literature twice. Belševica has also received the highest award of the Latvian State, namely the Three Star Order.

== Works ==
Vizma Belševica published her first poems in 1947; her first book of poetry appeared in 1955. Her most notable poetry collections are Jūra deg (The Sea is Burning, 1966), Gadu gredzeni (Rings of the Years, 1969), Madarās (In My Lady's Bedstraw, 1976), Kamola tinēja (The Clew Winder, 1981), Dzeltu laiks (Autumn Time, 1987). Her short stories' collections are Ķikuraga stāsti (Stories from Kikurags, 1965), Nelaime mājās (Misfortune at Home, 1979), Lauztā sirds uz goda dēļa (Broken Heart on the Board of Honour, 1997). During the post-Soviet period, Belševica wrote three semi-autobiographical books – stories about the girl Bille, following her life from the late 1930s, throughout the first year of Soviet occupation of Latvia (1940–41), the Nazi occupation (1941–45), and the first post-war years under Stalin's regime: Bille (Bille, 1992, 95), Bille un karš (initial title: Bille dzīvo tālāk) (Bille and War, 1996), Billes skaistā jaunība (The Wonderful Youth of Bille, 1999). Its first edition was published by the Latvian publisher Mežābele in 1992 in the United States and only in 1995 in Latvia. Now this trilogy has been recognized as one of the most important works of Latvian literature of all times. It has been translated into Swedish, but not in English.

Belševica's poetry and fiction has been translated in about 40 languages. Within the Soviet Union of the 1960s–1980s, several books of her selected poetry were published in Russian, Belarusian and Armenian. Her poems were translated into English by Inara Cedrins for the anthology Contemporary Latvian Poetry published by the University of Iowa Press in 1983. From the 1980s onwards, Belševica has been regularly present on the Swedish literary scene, (translator Juris Kronbergs), books of her poetry and Bille stories have enjoyed immense critical success and wide readership there. Her Selected Poems have been published also in Norway, Denmark and Iceland. Selected Short Stories – in Russia, Georgia, and Germany. The Russian translation of the Bille trilogy has been published in Riga, Latvia, the first two parts in a single volume in 2000, and the last part in 2002.

The first volume of the Bille trilogy was published in 2019 in Finnish.

In her work, she criticized the situation of oppressed nations in Soviet Union; therefore, from 1971 to 1974, she was not allowed to publish her works. Her name could not be mentioned in the media. KGB agents searched her apartment twice, confiscating manuscripts and notes.
