= Astrid Ivask =

Latvian-American poet (1926-2015)

Astrid Ivask

Astrid Ivask (born Astrīde Helēna Hartmane, Latvian Astrīde Ivaska; also; August 7, 1926 – March 24, 2015) was a Latvian-American poet.

== Biography ==
She was born Astrīde Helēna Hartmane in Riga, the daughter of Mārtiņš Hartmanis, a Latvian Army General, and Irma Marija Hartmane. Her brother was computer scientist Juris Hartmanis. Following the 1940 Soviet occupation of Latvia, General Hartmanis was imprisoned by the Soviet Union. He was executed in 1941, but his family would not learn of his fate until after the fall of the USSR in 1991.

Ivask, her mother, and brother left Latvia for displaced persons camps in Germany in 1944. Ivask studied languages at the University of Marburg. She later wrote "In Marburg-on-the-Laan European intellectual life was opened for me. In three years at the university, I worked with seven foreign languages, some living, some dead long ago, and I married into the area of Finno-Ugric culture." She completed her master's degree in 1949. The same year she married Estonian poet Ivar Ivask, who had earned his doctorate in literature and art history there, and they moved to the United States, where Ivar Ivask had been hired as a faculty member at St. Olaf College in Minnesota.

In 1967 they moved to Norman, Oklahoma, where Ivar Ivask became a professor of modern languages and literatures at the University of Oklahoma. She served as an adjunct professor teaching Russian, German and French. Ivar Ivask was editor of the university's literary journal World Literature Today and the couple hosted many authors and critics in their home and participated in readings and literary events.

In 1991, the couple moved to County Cork, Ireland, but Ivark Ivask died in 1992. Astrid Ivask returned to Riga in 2001.

== Work ==
Ivask's first poetry collection was Ezera kristības ("Baptism of the Lake", 1966). Other collections include Ziemas tiesa ("Winter's Judgment", 1968), Solis silos (“A Step in the Forest”, 1973), Līču loki ("Curving Bays", 1981), At the Fallow’s Edge (1981), Gaisma ievainoja ("The Light Wounded", 1982). Most of her work was written in Latvian, but one collection, Oklahoma Poems (1990), was written in English. Her collected poems is Wordings (1987).

Her other works include Pārsteigumi un atklājumi ("Surprises and Discoveries", 1984), children's poems and stories, and book of poetic travel sketches, Līču loki: Ainas un ainavas ("Curving Bays: Views and Landscapes", 1981), illustrated by the photography of Ivar Ivask.

== Awards and honors ==
She was awarded the Zinaida Lazda Prize for Ziemas tiesa and the Culture Foundation of Latvians Prize for Literature for Solis silos. She won the Jānis Jaunsudrabiņš Prose Prize for travel sketches. Pārsteigumi un atklājumi won the Goppers Prize. Her work Licu loki won the Jānis Jaunsudrabiņš Prose Prize. She was awarded Latvia's Order of the Three Stars, Estonia's Order of the White Star, and Latvian Writers Union Annual Award for her contributions to promoting culture and literature.
