= Inga Ābele =

Latvian writer

Inga Ābele (born 1972 in Riga) is a Latvian writer.

Ābele has written three novels and three short story collections, and is active as a playwright, poet and writer of plain prose. She is a member of the Latvian Writers Union. She has been awarded several national literature prizes and the Baltic Assembly Literature Prize in 2008 for her novel High Tide. Apart from High Tide, a collection of poems called The Horses of Atgazene Station as well as poems in various anthologies have been published in English.

The "Latvian Literature" platform describes Inga Ābele as being "one of the most important Latvian writers of her generation due to her unique style, which embraces the richness of language and human psychology, as well as variety of contexts – different historical times and current issues. Her prose builds powerful imagery and atmosphere. Her characters are created through deep psychological research into their souls. Inga Ābele can precisely make them resonate with the setting, be it a typical Latvian household, Latvian rural scenery or a factual historical era in the past."
