= Uldis Bērziņš =

Latvian poet and translator (1944–2021)

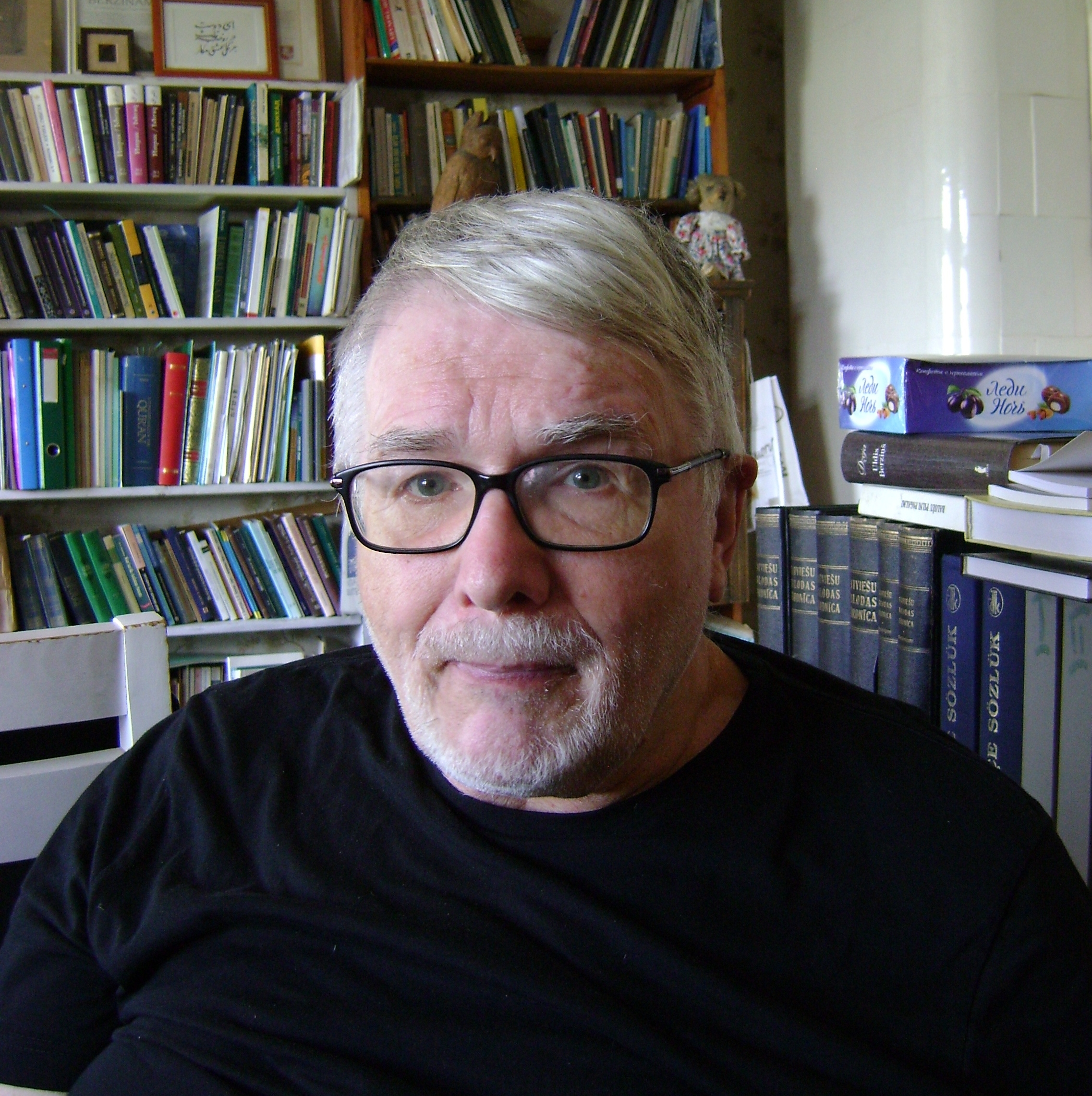
- Bērziņš in August 2017
- Born: 17 May 1944; Riga, Reichskommissariat Ostland (now Latvia)
- Died: 24 March 2021 (aged 76); Riga, Latvia
- Occupations: Poet, translator

Uldis Bērziņš (17 May 1944 – 24 March 2021) was a Latvian poet and translator.

== Biography ==
He studied Latvian philology at the University of Latvia and published his first collection of poetry in 1980. Bērziņš studied Turkish in Leningrad University Oriental Studies Department (from 1968 to 1971), and also studied in the Asian and African Studies section of Moscow State University (concentrating on Persian and Turkish), at Tashkent State University (Uzbek), Reykjavik University (Icelandic), as well as in Czechoslovakia, Sweden and other countries.

Bērziņš took part in the international Bible translation seminar at the Amsterdam Open University and Lund University forum over questions regarding Koran translations. From 2002 on he taught Turkish at the Modern Languages Department of the University of Latvia.

Bērziņš' poetry has been translated into German, Swedish, Estonian and Lithuanian. In 2009, Bērziņš finished the translation of Quran into Latvian, an enormous work that took him fifteen years. He remembered with fondness the half year he spent working in an Istanbul library. During his work, he was also in correspondence with numerous specialists of the Quran and Islam.

Bērziņš received various awards and honours such as the Order of the Three Stars (1995), the Zinaida Lazda award (1994), the Baltic Assembly Prize for Literature, the Arts and Science (1995) and the Spīdola Award (2000).

In 2009 and again in 2010, he was named one of the World's 500 most influential Muslims in survey conducted by the Royal Islamic Strategic Studies Center (though Bērziņš was actually Lutheran).

Bērziņš translated from Polish, Russian, Old Icelandic, Turkish, Azerbaijani, Turkmen, Persian, Ancient Hebrew and Arabic; he also knew Ivrit (Modern Hebrew), Tatar and Chuvash.

== Works ==
=== Poetry ===
- Izšūpojušies. Bibliotēka ostmalā. [Rocked. Library on the Levee]. Riga: Neputns, (2014)
- Saruna ar pastnieku ["Conversation With a Postman"], Rīga: Neputns (2009)
- Dzeja ["Poems"], Rīga: Atēna (2004)
- Maijs debešos ["May in the Heavens"], Riga: Preses Nams (2002)
- Daugavmala ["The Daugava’s Edge"], Riga: Nordik (1999)
- Nozagtie velosipēdi ["Stolen Bicycles"], Riga: Minerva, (1999)
- Dzeja ["Poems"], Rīga: Artava (1995)
- Kukaiņu soļi ["The Footsteps of Insects"], Riga: Rainis and Aspazija Foundation (1994)
- Laiks ["Time"; with Juris Kronbergs], Riga: Zinātne (1994)
- Nenotikušie atentāti ["Assassinations That Never Happened"], Riga: Liesma (1990)
- Poētisms baltkrievs ["Belarusian Poetics"], Riga: Liesma (1984)
- Piemineklis kazai ["Monument to a Goat"], Riga: Liesma (1980)

=== Translations ===
- Translation of the Quran to the Latvian language.

== Awards and honours ==
- 1994, Zinaida Lazda Award
- 1995, Order of the Three Stars
- 1995, the Baltic Assembly Award
- 2000, the Spīdola Award
- 2009, Poetry Days prize for translations
- 2009, the Annual Latvian Literary Prize for his collection of poems Conversation with a Postman
- 2016, The Dzintars Sodums' Award for his translation of the ancient Icelandic Songs of Edda
