= Knuts Skujenieks =

Latvian poet, journalist, and translator (1936–2022)

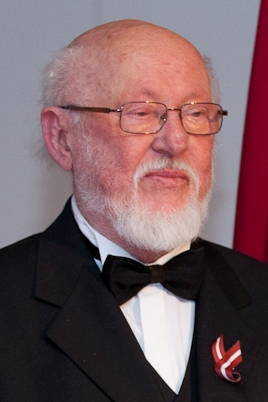
- Skujenieks in 2012
- Born: 5 September 1936; Riga, Latvia
- Died: 25 July 2022 (aged 85)
- Occupation(s): Poet, translator

Knuts Skujenieks (5 September 1936 – 25 July 2022) was a Latvian poet, journalist, and translator from fifteen European languages.

He spent his childhood near Bauska in Zemgale. Skujenieks later studied at University of Latvia in Riga and at the Maxim Gorky Literature Institute in Moscow.

In 1962, he was convicted of anti-Soviet activities, and sentenced to seven years in a prison camp in Mordovia, Russia. Although he was a prolific poet, his first collection was only published in 1978. The poems he wrote during his captivity were published in 1990. Skujenieks' poetry has been translated into many European languages. Books of his poetry have been published in Sweden and Ukraine. In 2008, he was awarded the Baltic Assembly Prize for Literature.

In 2015, film director Ivars Tontegode shot a biographical documentary feature Knutification/Nepareizais about the life of Knuts Skujenieks.

== Bibliography ==
- Lirika un balsis (Lyrics and Voices; Riga, Liesma Publ., 1978)
- Iesien baltā lakatiņā (Tie it into a White Cloth; Riga, Liesma Publ., 1986)
- Sēkla sniegā (Seed in the Snow; Riga, Liesma Publ., 1990)
