= The Pagan King =

2018 film by Aigars Grauba

- Directed by: Aigars Grauba
- Written by: Aigars Grauba; Max Kinnings
- Produced by: Andrejs Ēķis
- Starring: Edvin Endre; James Bloor; Aistė Diržiūtė; Ivo Martinsons; Gints Andžāns; Lauris Dzelzītis; Dainis Grūbe; Andris Keišs; Artūrs Skrastiņš; Egons Dombrovskis; Elīna Vāne
- Cinematography: Valdis Celmiņš
- Edited by: Liga Pipare
- Music by: Rihards Zaļupe
- Production company: Platforma Film
- Distributed by: Latvian Theatrical Distribution (Latvia); Ascot Elite Entertainment Group
- Release date: 17 January 2018
- Running time: 110 minutes
- Country: United Kingdom / Latvia
- Language: English
- Budget: €3 million

The Pagan King (Latvian: Nameja gredzens – 'Namejs Ring', initially The King's Ring) is a 2018 historical action film directed by Aigars Grauba and co-written by Max Kinnings and Grauba. The film stars Edvin Endre, James Bloor, Aistė Diržiūtė and others.

== Plot ==
The legend of the Namejs Ring is a story that takes place in the 13th century in Semigallia, where the young Namejs (Edvin Endre) becomes the new king after the death of Viesturs (Egons Dombrovskis). The film follows Namejs as he attempts to deal with and repel Christian influence in Semigallia.

== Cast ==
- Edvin Endre as Namejs
- James Bloor as Max von Buxhoeveden
- Aistė Diržiūtė as Lauga
- Ivo Martinsons as Valdis
- Andris Keišs as Ulup
- Artūrs Skrastiņš as Pope
- Dainis Grūbe as Pihto, prince of Saaremaa
- Egons Dombrovskis as Viesturs
- Elīna Vāne as Queen Rama
- Gints Andžāns as Saken
- Lauris Dzelzītis as Lemme
- Jānis Āmanis as Fulke
- Kaspars Kārkliņš as Arko
- Toms Auniņš as Daugulis
- Kaspars Zāle as Birre
- Anete Berķe as Gilla
- Maija Arvena Ozoliņa as Sigi

== Production ==
On 23 March 2014 Grauba and Ēķis presented the idea of a historical fiction movie about freedom fights of Semigallia in 13th century and its leader Namejs. The principal photography of the film began in December 2014 in Cinevilla backlot.

== Release ==
The film's premier took place on 17 January 2018.
