= The Playlist (TV series) =

2022 Swedish TV series

- Genre: Drama
- Inspired by: Spotify Untold by Sven Carlsson and Jonas Leijonhufvud
- Developed by: Christian Spurrier; Luke Franklin
- Written by: Christian Spurrier; Sofie Forsman; Tove Forsman
- Screenplay by: Christian Spurrier
- Directed by: Per-Olav Sørensen; Hallgrim Haug
- Starring: Edvin Endre; Ulf Stenberg; Gizem Erdogan; Joel Lützow; Christian Hillborg
- Composer: Kristian Eidnes Andersen
- Countries of origin: Sweden; United Kingdom
- Original language: Swedish
- No. of seasons: 1
- No. of episodes: 6

Production
- Executive producers: Per-Olav Sørensen; Christian Spurrier; Berna Levin; Luke Franklin; Stefan Baron
- Producers: Peter Onsmark; Eiffel Mattsson
- Production locations: Stockholm, Sweden
- Cinematography: Jonas Alarik; Ulf Brantås
- Editors: Katie Hetland; Simen Gengenbach; Håkan Wärn
- Running time: 45 minutes
- Production company: Yellow Bird UK

Original release
- Network: Netflix
- Release: 13 October 2022

The Playlist is a docu-drama miniseries created for Netflix. It was inspired by the book Spotify Untold written by Sven Carlsson and Jonas Leijonhufvud. Directed by Per-Olav Sørensen, the series tells a "fictionalized" story of the birth of the Swedish music streaming company Spotify, along with its early challenges.

The Playlist premiered on Netflix on 13 October 2022.

== Premise ==
An aspiring entrepreneur, Daniel Ek, finds an opportunity among the battle between music industries' heavy-hitters and music piracy. Ek sees a solution, never seen before in a turbulent music industry. He then decides to build a free and legalized music streaming service along with his business partner, Martin Lorentzon. Little did he know, that service would "revolutionize" global music industry and face unforeseen challenges along with its foundations.

== Cast and characters ==
=== Starring ===
- Edvin Endre as Daniel Ek, co-founder and CEO of Spotify who previously worked as a software engineer for Tradera.
- Christian Hillborg as Martin Lorentzon, co-founder and primary investor of Spotify, owner & Co-founder of Tradedoubler.
- Joel Lützow as Andreas Ehn, a gifted programmer, Spotify's first employee and CTO is who Ek recruits to build the Spotify application.
- Gizem Erdogan as Petra Hansson, top-performing lawyer who was offered a position as a music licensing negotiator in Spotify.
- Ulf Stenberg as Per Sundin, one of the executives of Sony Music Sweden who had struggled with the advent of The Pirate Bay.
- Janice Kamya Kavander as Bobbi Thomasson, an aspiring musician who is a former classmate of Daniel Ek.

=== Recurring co-stars ===
- Valter Skarsgård as Peter Sunde, one of the founders of The Pirate Bay and a political activist.
- Krister Kern as Felix Hagnö, co-founder of Tradedoubler.
- Sofia Karemyr as Stephanie Dahlgren, secretary of Per Sundin who Daniel encounters.
- Severija Janušauskaitė as Maxine Silverson, Sony Music executive who is acquainted with Per Sundin.
- Sam Hazeldine as Ken Parks, formidable lawyer who works for Sony Music.
- Ella Rappich as Sophia Bendz, head of global marketing of Spotify who previously organized party events through Facebook.
- Erik Norén as Niklas Ivarsson, the only person who initially in charge of music acquisition of Spotify.
- Rufus Glaser as Ludvig Strigeus, one of the programmers of Spotify who had experience with P2P caching.
- Jonatan Bökman as Gunnar Kreitz, Andreas' friend from college who Andreas considers to be the best programmer in the world.
- Karl Sanner as Fredrik Niemelä, Andreas' friend who Andreas considers to be able to rival Gunnar.
- Lucas Serby as Mattias Arrelid, Andreas' acquaintance who he recruits to build Spotify's program.
- Alexander Gustavsson as Andreas Mattsson, Andreas' acquaintance who he recruits to build Spotify's program.
- Vincent Pellegini as Rasmus Andersson, Andreas' acquaintance user interface designer of the first version of Spotify.
- Joel Almroth as Johann Brenner, Andreas' acquaintance who he recruits to build Spotify's program.
- Felice Jankell as Sofia Levander, Daniel Ek's wife.
- Frida K Eriksson as Daniel's mother.

=== Guest stars ===
- Benjamin Löfquist as Fredrik Neij, co-founder of The Pirate Bay and a fellow political activist.
- Thore Biselli as Gottfrid Svartholm, co-founder of The Pirate Bay.
- Orlando Wells as Peter Thiel, venture capitalist who invests in Spotify.
- Samuel Fröler as Henrik Pontén, chief investigator of Swedish police who handles The Pirate Bay raid.
- Lisette Pagler as Karin Sundin, Per's wife who is also a mother of Billy Sundin.
- David Bredh as William Sundin, Per's son who is indifferent towards music piracy.
- Hanna Ardéhn as Lisa, medical student who works part-time in a bar Andreas regularly visits.
- Malin Barr as Aven, Petra's colleague who works at Smith-Ardehn Law Firm.
- Christoffer Willén as Carl, Petra's superior of Smith-Ardehn Law Firm.
- Dan Lilja as Mattias Mischke, the chief executive officer of Stardoll's game development company.
- Christel Elsayah as Felicia, radio host of Summer Talk Show who interviews Martin.
- Paul Albertson as Stanley Barret, representative of a popular artist, Taylor Swift.
- John Carew as Anton, one of the early investors of Spotify from Arctic Equity Partners.
- Sandra Redlaff as Esther Ren, one of the early investors of Spotify from Serendipity Capitals.
- Fredrik Wagner as Mats Lundholm, Greta's husband who is a lawyer.
- Janna Granström as Greta Lundholm, Karin's friend who becomes acquainted with Sundin family.
- Agnes Kittelsen as Ann Almquist, one of Spotify's executives who previously worked in politics.
- Patrick Baladi as Jim Anderson, one of Spotify's executives who tests its upcoming features of the service.
- Amy Deasismont as Nadya Johanssen, former musician who is a protester.
- Tim Ahern as Senator Grayson West, One of the U.S. senators present during Spotify's accusation hearing.
- Dionne Audain as Senator Madison Landy, One of the U.S. senators who issues Spotify's accusation hearing.
- Reuben Sallmander as Tom Holgersson

== Episodes ==
No.	Title	Directed by	Written by	Original release date
1	"The Vision"	Per Olav Sørensen	Christian Spurrier	13 October 2022
In Rågsved 2004, Daniel Ek applies for a job at Google after feeling dissatisfied with his job at Tradera to his mother's objection. After being rejected by Google, he becomes frustrated and decides to hack Google's server to optimize Tradera's search results, leading to his resignation and decision to start his own business instead. He eventually chooses to form Advertigo, ad-revenue based service. Seeing opportunity in Tradedoubler's search for new business idea, Ek decides to have an appointment with co-CEOs of Tradedoubler, Martin Lorentzon and Felix Hagnö. The former decides to buy Advertigo, making Ek a millionaire. Meeting his high school friend, Bobbi Thomasson, after his success, in addition to The Pirate Bay founder's arrest, inspires him to create a "better and legalized" music streaming service which he later shares with Martin with the latter become invested in the idea. Both Ek and Lorentzon form Spotify based on this idea and successfully form a highly optimal team for it. The team later find issues in acquiring music licence after successfully built the software until they found a struggling music executive on Sony, Per Sundin, and successfully "coerced" him to give the music licence, much to the latter's disagreement saying that's not what really happened to the audience.
2	"The Industry"	Per Olav Sørensen and Hallgrim Haug	Christian Spurrier	13 October 2022
Couple of years before the formation of Spotify, Per Sundin had been pressured by the higher-ups at Sony Music HQ to fire most of his staff on Swedish branch due to the advent of music digitization and piracy. Feeling stressed and frustrated due to The Pirate Bay's activism, he calls Henrik Pontén, the lead investigator of The Pirate Bay case, persuaded him to execute a raid on The Pirate Bay servers, albeit unsuccessfully due to Peter Sunde's escape prior to the raid and increased usage of The Pirate Bay website, much to Sundin's frustration. After being persuaded by his family, he decides to negotiate with Peter Sunde, seeing the need of change in the music industry. The negotiation went south when the latter expresses more interests with his ideals than the welfare of music industry workers. Years later, he meets Daniel Ek when he visits Bobbi T's concert with the former proposing Spotify, with Sundin mildly rejects the proposal. Per later expresses the interest in Spotify during Ek's visit in the recording studio after testing the service. He goes to the Sony Music HQ afterwards to ask support from the chairman, only to be rejected. Sundin ended up quitting Sony to work for Universal Music after one of the Universal's executive expressed interest in Spotify. With Spotify successfully acquiring music licence through Sundin's help, the company officially launches with Sundin thanking Ek and his associates, alongside an unknown woman, who later explains to the audience that there is more behind the story of Spotify's launch, introducing herself as Petra Hansson, Spotify's head of music acquisition.
3	"The Law"	Per Olav Sørensen	Sofie Forsman and Tove Forsman	13 October 2022
Petra Hansson have worked as litigator for Smith-Ardehn Law Firm. She is considered as competent in her job with the prospect of being senior partner of the law firm. Before her promotion, she meets Martin Lorentzon, primary investor of Spotify after the former declines appointment with him. Martin tries to recruit her as the head of music acquisition, inviting her to Spotify office, but Petra declines regardless. She later attended the party in Smith-Ardehn building and finds out that she is being promoted as junior partner. She grows disappointed with her superior, Carl, after the latter refuses to include her in a certain music acquisition case, fostering her interest in Spotify. She eventually take Martin's offer as the head of music acquisition of Spotify. However, Hansson finds her job becoming increasingly difficult as she had to deal with Daniel Ek's unrealistic expectations while dealing with much stricter demands from various music companies, with Ken Parks being one of the latter litigators. Petra is offered a senior partner position at her old firm soon after Lorentzon was unable to pay her, which she takes after showing her dissatisfaction with Daniel. During her first day as senior partner, she breaks her bracelet, accidentally giving her an idea on how to save Spotify. Being passionate on the idea of saving Spotify, she abruptly quits her position and presents the idea, which involves adding a premium plan to the service, to the Spotify team, eventually gaining approval from the group. She first presents the idea to Sony Music, only to be refused by the latter under the suggestion of Carl from Smith-Ardehn. Feeling unsatisfied, she uses the information of Ken Parks working as a free agent to locate him. Flying all the way to Las Vegas, she successfully recruited him to help on Spotify's music acquisition under the exchange of 15 percent of Spotify's share. With Parks' help, Petra secures music licensing from various music companies, leading to a successful launch of Spotify, much to Andreas Ehn's chagrin, telling Hansson that she had "ruined" Spotify. Andreas later tells the audience that her story is not what really happened.
4	"The Coder"	Per Olav Sørensen	Christian Spurrier	13 October 2022
Andreas Ehn, gifted software engineer of Stardoll AB had become completely disillusioned on start-ups once Mattias Miksche showed little to no interest on a new Stardoll game he had been working on. However, Daniel Ek, then the technical consultant for Stardoll AB, notices the new game Andreas had been working on, complimenting his skill. Daniel then suggests that Andreas should work for himself, just like he did, which in turn picked up Ehn's interest in him. Andreas then accepts the invitation by Daniel to go to the cafe with him, having a couple of intellectual conversations with each other before Ek presents the idea of Spotify to him, explaining how it would be a "far superior" music streaming service compared to The Pirate Bay. Eventually, Andreas decides to join Spotify under the condition that he is able to build his own team to build the software and decides the workflow of the team, in addition to having a percentage of the company. Andreas then recruits his friends and colleagues, among them are Fredik Niemela and Gunnar Kreitz. Ehn and his development team soon encountered multiple problems with the software, with Ek demanding extremely fast response from the software, in addition to funding shortage of the company servers. The team eventually succeeds in building the software under the cost of Andreas' personal life. Andreas' problem with Spotify rose once Daniel and Martin Lorentzon recruits Ludvig Strigeus and Petra Hansson under the reasons of software development and music licensing respectively, with Ehn slowly realizing that his vision of Spotify drastically differs from Ek's vision of it. Andreas ultimately resigns from the company long after the Spotify's official launch once Martin reveals he no longer had the majority control of Spotify, with Ehn departing to Singapore along with Lisa, whom Martin had introduced to him long before the company's launch. Martin who had been at the same airport as Andreas, later tells the audience that's not what really happened.
5	"The Partner"	Per Olav Sørensen and Hallgrim Haug	Sofie Forsman and Tove Forsman	13 October 2022
Couple of years after the Spotify launch, Martin Lorentzon is seen entering a radio station, meeting the host of the Summer Talk Show, Felicia. Martin had agreed to be interviewed for her show about his overall journey. He first tells her about Daniel Ek's wedding on Lake Como, 2016, where he had made an inappropriate joke while giving Daniel a salute. He then divulges his childhood in 1970s, explaining that he had always been considered as eccentric all the way to adulthood. Martin then revealed that while he had become a successful entrepreneur, he also had struggled with assumptions of being irresponsible because of it, with Lorentzon being blocked out from Tradedoubler's day-to-day operations as a result. He then tells her regarding his encounters with Daniel and how he had persuaded him to build Spotify and eventually became Ek's business partner. Lorentzon then tells Felicia the first steps he had taken with Spotify, along with its successes and struggles, among them are hiring Niklas Ivarsson and Sophia Bendz, as head of music acquisition and head of global marketing respectively; getting more investors to fund the company and changing Spotify's stock currency, while dealing with Ek's objections. Eventually, Felicia stops recording, telling Martin that he lacks perceived struggle in his story. Martin then convinces her to keep recording as he wasn't finished. He further explains his eccentric behavior, first by telling her about Peter Thiel's diagnosis of his behavior, assuming that Lorentzon had ADHD. Martin then tells her about the Taylor Swift's controversy and how his behavior had caused a rift between Daniel and him. Lorentzon eventually tells her that he is dismissed as the co-CEO of Spotify some time after Ek's wedding. The two then conclude the show while Bobbi Thomasson shows up, asking the audience whether they had been wondering about her.
6	"The Artist"	Per Olav Sørensen	Christian Spurrier	13 October 2022
In 2024, Bobbi Thomasson is a struggling musician and a single mother, and her contract with Per Sundin has expired. Meanwhile, Daniel Ek, who had been facing multiple controversies surrounding Spotify, including "Scratch The Record" activism, plans to launch a Spotify feature that boosts shareholder's earnings at the expense of artists' compensation. Feeling distant with Daniel for several years, Bobbi publishes a post, questioning his actions regarding artists' compensation and requesting a conversation with him. The post inadvertently goes viral, causing Daniel to unfollow her on Instagram. Noticing Daniel's action, Bobbi becomes involved as an activist in the "Scratch The Record" campaign, further causing trouble for Spotify. Refusing to sell the company to ease shareholders, Ek visits Sundin to chide him for the record companies paying such low royalties to artists. Daniel visits a bar Bobbi is performing at, trying to sway her to abandon her activism, but she refuses. The conflict escalates to the point that the U.S. Senate holds a hearing at which Daniel and Bobbi testify. The hearing does not seem to be going in Spotify's favor, but Daniel is pleased to learn they have secured a $1 billion loan to sustain the company. Bobbi and Daniel meet at Lincoln Memorial Reflecting Pool one final time where Daniel says he would have been better off never having listened to anyone. The scene then glitches away to reveal a film crew shooting Daniel in front of a blue screen, indicating the events of the episode never happened.

== Production ==
=== Development ===
On 11 December 2019, Netflix announced a yet to be named limited series about the founding of music streaming company, Spotify. The series was inspired by a non-fiction book, Spotify Untold, written by Sven Carlsson and Jonas Leijonhufvud, business reporters at Swedish Dagens Industri. Berna Levin of Yellow Bird UK would serve as the executive producer of the series and Per-Olav Sørensen will direct the series. On 14 June 2021, further announcements were made, revealing that the series will consist of six 45-minute episodes. In addition, Eiffel Mattsson and Luke Franklin would be producing along with Levin; meanwhile, Christian Spurrier was hired as the screenwriter for the series. On 13 September 2022, Sofie Forsman and Tove Forsman were revealed as series co-writers.

=== Casting ===
Casting for the series leads were revealed on 14 June 2021. Edvin Endre and Christian Hillborg were cast as the co-founders of Spotify. Ulf Stenberg, Gizem Erdogan, and Joel Lützow also took leading roles.

=== Filming ===
The filming of the series happened starting in 2021. It was revealed that part of the principal photography took place in Stockholm, Sweden in June 2021. Some of the filming took place in Croatia and Lithuania. The post-production process was in November 2021. In August 2022, the production wrapped filming.

== Release ==
The Playlist premiered globally on Netflix on 13 October 2022, and consists of six episodes.

=== Marketing ===
First trailer of the limited series was released on YouTube on 13 September 2022. The second trailer was released on 27 September 2022.

== Reception ==
The Playlist overall received positive reviews from critics. On the review aggregator website Rotten Tomatoes, 100% of 6 critics' reviews are positive, with an average rating of 6.30/10. Tom Goodwyn of TechRadar gave the series 5/5 stars, praising its writing, directing, and cast performances, with the story being told from six different perspectives noted as its biggest strength. Joel Keller of Decider similarly gave the series praise on its cast performances, particularly on Janice Kamya Kavander's acting, while noting the repetitiveness of its storytelling. Stuart Heritage of The Guardian gave the series 3/5 stars, also praised the multiple perspective of the storytelling while finding some episodes "a frustratingly bitty watch". Conversely, Mike McCahill of Variety criticized the series, comparing it to David Fincher's movie about Facebook, The Social Network, and saying The Playlist lacked "anything like the electric thrill of the Fincher film".
