= Edvin Endre =

Swedish actor

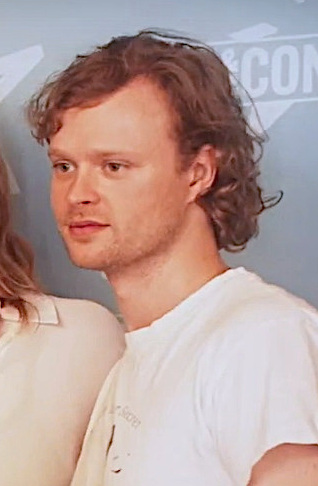
- Endre - GFCC Babelsberg 2024
- Born: Edvin Leonard Hugo Endre; 1 July 1994 (age 32); Stockholm, Sweden
- Occupation: Actor

Edvin Leonard Hugo Endre (born 1 July 1994) is a Swedish actor, best known for his role as 'Mister' in the 2013 Swedish comedy film Studentfesten. From 2014 to 2016, he portrayed the recurring character Erlendur, son of King Horik, in the historical drama television series Vikings.

In 2016, Endre portrayed Matti Nykänen, a former world champion Finnish ski jumper in the British biographical sports film Eddie the Eagle. In 2018, he played the role of Semigallian Duke Namejs in the historical fiction action film The Pagan King.

== Background ==
Endre is the son of Swedish actress Lena Endre and actor and former footballer Thomas Hanzon.

== Filmography ==
=== Film ===
- The Hidden Child (2013), young Axel
- Eddie the Eagle (2016), Matti Nykänen
- The Pagan King (2018), Nameisis
- Hammarskjöld (2023)

=== Television ===
- Vikings (2014–2016), Prince Erlendur
- Fortitude (2017-2018), Rune Lennox
- Idaten (2019), Daniel
- Blinded (2019), Carl Rehnskiöld
- A Class Apart (2021), Philip Carnebo
- The Playlist (2022), Daniel Ek

=== Animation ===
- Moominvalley (2019), Snufkin
