= LLU Sporta klubs =

Latvian rugby club

Latvijas Lauksaimniecības universitāte Sporta klubs
- Location: Jelgava, Latvia
- Ground(s): Daugavas stadions
Team kit

LLU Sporta klubs is a Latvian rugby club based in Jelgava. The team is the official rugby team of the Latvia University of Agriculture (Latvijas Lauksaimniecības universitāte).
