= Blizzard of Souls =

Blizzard of Souls can be:

- Blizzard of Souls (novel), 1934 novel by Aleksandrs Grīns
- Blizzard of Souls (film), 2019 film directed by Dzintars Dreibergs
