= Tērvete Municipality =

Former municipality of Latvia

Coordinates: 56°28′46″N 23°23′23″E

Tērvete Municipality Tērvetes novads
- Municipality
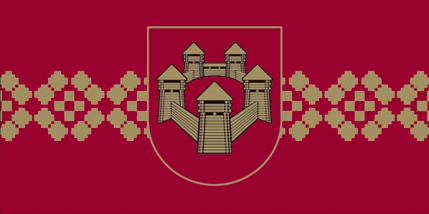
- Flag Coat of arms

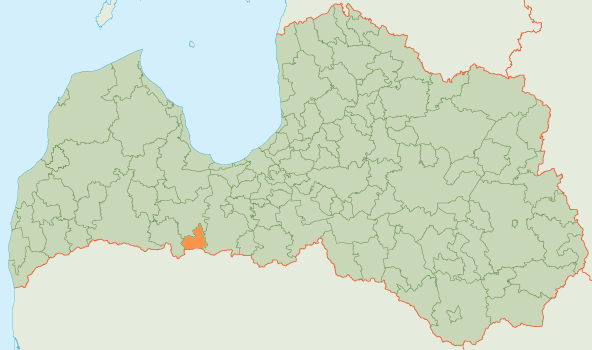
- Country: Latvia
- Formed: 2002
- Dissolved: 2021
- Centre: Zelmeņi

Government
  - Council Chair (last): Dace Reinika (Our Home Is Here/LZS)

Area
  - Total: 223.79 km^{2} (86.41 sq mi)
  - Land: 219.46 km^{2} (84.73 sq mi)
  - Water: 4.33 km^{2} (1.67 sq mi)

Population (2021)
  - Total: 3,273
  - Density: 14.91/km^{2} (38.63/sq mi)
- Website: www.tervetesnov.lv

Tērvete Municipality (Latvian: Tērvetes novads) is a former municipality in Semigallia, Latvia. The municipality was formed in 2002 by merging Augstkalne parish, Bukaiši parish and Tērvete parish, the administrative centre being Zelmeņi. The population in 2020 was 3,302.

On 1 July 2021, Tērvete Municipality ceased to exist and its territory was merged into Dobele Municipality.

== Geography ==
The largest rivers are Auce, Ālave, Govaine, Krievaine, Reņģe, Skujaine, Svēpaine, Svētaine, Svete, Tērvete.

== History ==
The county of Tērvete is located in the territory of the ancient Semigallian Territory, which was first mentioned in the Livonian Chronicle of Henry in the XXIII, section 4, in the context of the events of 1219, as the "province called Tervete" (Latin: provincia, que Thervetene vocatur ).

== See also ==
- Administrative divisions of Latvia
