= Daniel Ek =

Swedish businessman (born 1983)

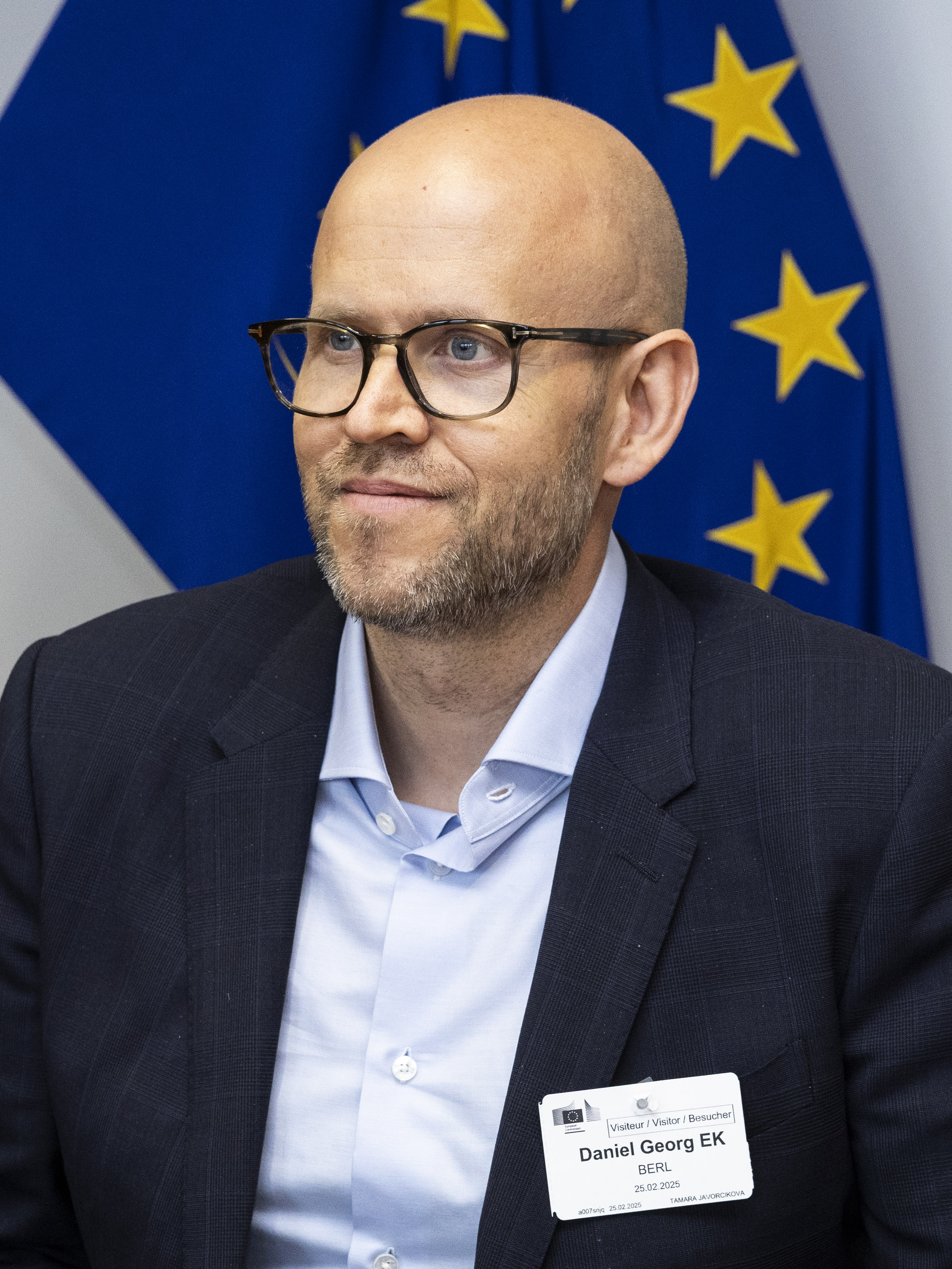
- Ek in 2025
- Born: Daniel Georg Ek; 21 February 1983 (age 43); Stockholm, Sweden
- Occupation: Businessman
- Years active: 2006–present
- Title: Founder, Executive Chairman and former CEO of Spotify; Co-founder and chairman of Neko Health; Co-founder of Prima Materia; Chairman of Helsing
- Spouse: Sofia Levander (m. 2016)
- Children: 2

Signature
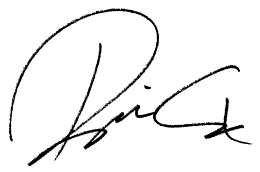

Daniel Georg Ek (Swedish pronunciation: [ˈdɑ̂ːnɪɛl ˈjěːɔrj ěːk]; born 21 February 1983) is a Swedish businessman and technologist. He is the founder, executive chairman and former CEO of Spotify. As of August 2026, his net worth was estimated at $12.5 billion by Forbes.

== Early life and education ==
Ek grew up in the Rågsved district of Stockholm, Sweden. He graduated from high school in IT-Gymnasiet in Sundbyberg Municipality in 2002 and then studied engineering at the KTH Royal Institute of Technology for 8 weeks before dropping out to focus on his IT career.

== Career ==
=== Early career ===
Ek began making websites and open-source technologies as early as fourteen years old. Shortly after graduating high school he worked at Jajja, a search engine optimization firm. Ek had a senior role at Nordic auction company Tradera, which was acquired by eBay in 2006. He was also the CTO of the browser-based game and fashion community Stardoll and later started Advertigo, an online advertising company. Advertigo was sold to TradeDoubler in 2006, after which Ek briefly became the CEO of μTorrent, working with μTorrent founder Ludvig Strigeus until μTorrent was sold to BitTorrent in December 2006. Strigeus would later join Ek as a Spotify developer.

=== Spotify ===
The sale of Advertigo as well as his previous work made Ek wealthy enough that he decided to retire. However, after a few months, he realized he wanted a new project, leading to him founding Spotify. Ek first had the idea for Spotify around 2002 when peer-to-peer music service Napster shut down and another illegal site Kazaa took over. Ek said he "realized that you can never legislate away from piracy. Laws can definitely help, but it doesn't take away the problem. The only way to solve the problem was to create a service that was better than piracy and at the same time compensates the music industry – that gave us Spotify."

Ek incorporated Spotify AB with Martin Lorentzon in Stockholm, Sweden in 2006. Lorentzon had previously worked at and co-founded TradeDoubler, which acquired Ek's previous company Advertigo. In October 2008, the company launched its legal music streaming service Spotify. Initially, Spotify ran on a peer-to-peer distribution model, similar to μTorrent, but switched to a server-client model in 2014. In October 2016, Spotify co-founder Martin Lorentzon announced he would be stepping down as chairman and Ek would be taking over alongside his role as CEO. As of April 2019, Spotify has 217 million active users and as of June 2017 had raised over $2.5 billion in venture funding.

In 2011, 2012 and 2013, Ek was selected for the Forbes 30 under 30 list in the Technology, Consumer Technology and Music categories, followed by the Forbes 30 under 30 Hall of Fame in 2022.

In 2017, Ek was named the most powerful person in the music industry by Billboard.

In May 2022, Ek invested an additional $50 million to acquire more Spotify shares, citing an optimistic future outlook for the streaming giant. Spotify at that time had 182 million paying subscribers and was growing at 15% year on year. On 30 September 2025, Ek announced that he would step down as CEO of Spotify at the end of the year, while remaining as executive chairman. In the role, his succeeding co-CEOs will continue to report to him, while he focuses on capital allocation, long-term strategy, and regulatory efforts.

=== Neko Health ===
Ek co-founded the medical technology company Neko Health in 2018, along with engineer Hjalmar Nilsonne. The company provides full-body scans and blood tests, and uses sensors and artificial intelligence to collect and analyze health data. Initially self-funded with €30 million from Ek through his investment vehicle, the company has since received backing from outside investors. Ek chairs the company but is not involved in daily operations. As of 2026, the company has locations in Stockholm and London.

=== Prima Materia ===
Ek established Prima Materia, an investment company, along with Spotify investor Shakil Khan in February 2021, pledging to invest $1 billion into European "moonshots." Prima Materia was an early investor in German defense technology company Helsing, of which Ek is chairman. In 2025, the Financial Times reported Prima Materia led a €600 million (£446 million) investment in Helsing.

== Views ==
=== Political positions ===
In 2016, Ek and fellow Spotify co-founder Martin Lorentzon wrote an open letter on the blogging platform Medium to the Swedish government saying that if certain changes to Swedish law regarding housing, taxation, and education are not made, Spotify will be forced to relocate from the country. More specifically, Ek claims that the high taxes in Sweden on stock options makes it difficult to incentivize programmers to work at startups when startups have trouble competing with larger companies on salary. Moreover, Ek claims the Swedish permitting policy is overly restrictive, limiting the supply of affordable housing.

=== Music and streaming ===
In an interview with Music Ally in 2020, Ek stated, "There is a narrative fallacy here, combined with the fact that, obviously, some artists that used to do well in the past may not do well in this future landscape, where you can't record music once every three to four years and think thats going to be enough." Ek added that "the artists today that are making it realise that it's about creating a continuous engagement with their fans. It is about putting the work in, about the storytelling around the album, and about keeping a continuous dialogue with your fans."

== Personal life ==
In 2016, Ek married Sofia Levander, his longtime partner, at Lake Como. At Ek's wedding, Bruno Mars performed and Chris Rock officiated; he invited numerous guests, including Mark Zuckerberg. Ek and his wife have two daughters together.

Ek is a lifelong supporter of Premier League club Arsenal, and, in April 2021, expressed an interest in purchasing the football club if it were put up for sale. In May 2021, Ek made an offer to buy the club for approximately £1.8 billion, which was rejected by the owners.

== In popular culture ==
In the 2022 Netflix miniseries The Playlist, Ek is portrayed by Edvin Endre.

== Criticism ==
Following his 2020 interview with Music Ally, Ek received strong criticism from artists and producers alike. Mike Mills of R.E.M. said: "Music=product, and must be churned out regularly, says billionaire Daniel Ek. Go fuck yourself." Producer Jacknife Lee was also critical of Ek, stating "They need content, and it needs to be cheap so therefore it needs to be mass produced. Quality doesn't matter really, it's reliability they're looking for".

Tweeting in May 2024, Ek stated that he sees minimal cost to producing music with recent technological advances. He goes on to discuss the shelf life of music and the obsolescence of older works. He also mentions Stoicism in relation to Marcus Aurelius's thoughts resonating broadly with the populace. He also thinks that some products may be unintuitive. After receiving criticism for his comments from some members of the music industry, Ek said he was initially too vague in his wording. He says he was reductive of works but that he didn't intend for this statement to be received how it was. He goes on to say that works of a "world-changing" scale shouldn't get lost in the noise and states the importance he sees of low-cost creative computer peripherals. Matt Tong, former drummer of Bloc Party, as well as Rob Harris, the guitarist of Jamiroquai, both responded with tweets critical of Ek and Spotify.

In 2023, Spotify began releasing annual artist remuneration reports as part of their Loud & Clear initiative.

Prima Materia's investment in the defence technology company Helsing was criticised by various artists on Spotify, with some sharing sentiments that having their music on Spotify was helping Helsing implement artificial intelligence and create drones for military operations. Bands such as Deerhoof, Xiu Xiu, King Gizzard and the Lizard Wizard, Godspeed You! Black Emperor, Sylvan Esso and Massive Attack have responded by pulling their music from Spotify in protest.
