= Latvia University of Life Sciences and Technologies =

University in Jelgava, Latvia

Coordinates: 56°40′01″N 23°45′37″E

- Latvijas Biozinātņu un tehnoloģiju universitāte
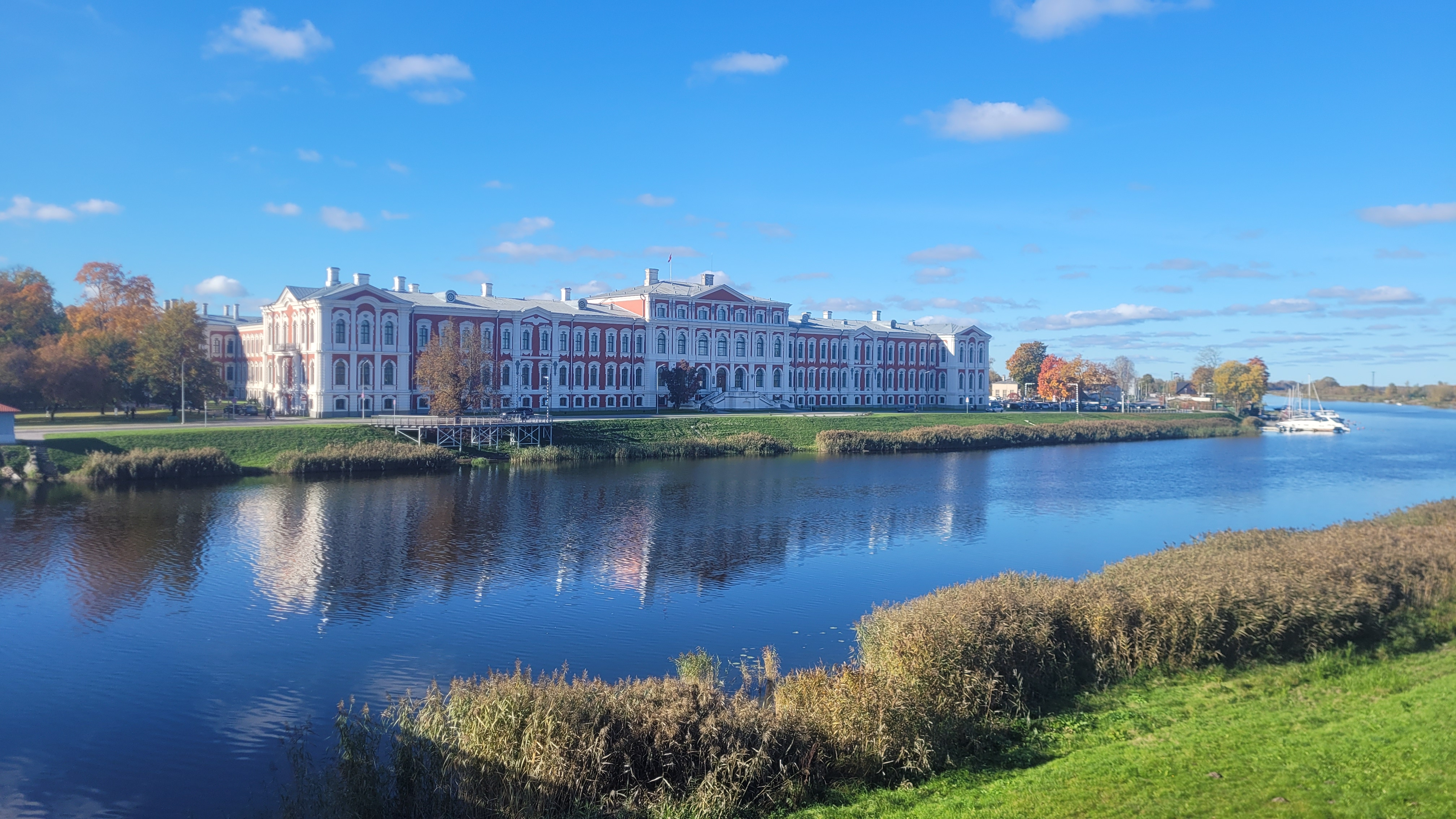
- Main campus in Jelgava
- Former names: Jelgava Academy of Agriculture (1936–1944), Latvia Academy of Agriculture (1944–1990); Latvia University of Agriculture (1990–2018)
- Motto: Proventus pro patria
- Motto in English: For the Growth of the Fatherland
- Type: Public
- Established: 1938; 88 years ago
- Rector: Irina Arhipova
- Administrative staff: 354
- Students: 3756 (2023)
- Doctoral students: 104 (2023)
- Location: Jelgava, Latvia
- Colours: green
- Website: https://www.lbtu.lv/en

University rankings

Regional – Overall
- QS Emerging Europe and Central Asia: 241-250 (2022)

The Latvia University of Life Sciences and Technologies (LBTU; Latvian: Latvijas Biozinātņu un tehnoloģiju universitāte), previously Latvia University of Agriculture (LLU; Latvijas Lauksaimniecības universitāte), is a university in Jelgava, Latvia, specializing in agricultural science, forestry, food technology and related areas.

== History ==
- The university originated as the Agricultural Department at the Riga Polytechnical Institute in 1863, which in 1919 became the Faculty of Agriculture at the University of Latvia. It became an independent institution in 1939, when it was established as the Academy of Agriculture in the Jelgava Palace, which had been renovated for that purpose. It was renamed to the Latvia University of Agriculture in 1990 and Latvia University of Life Sciences and Technologies in 2018.

== Organisation ==
From September 1, 2023, there is structural changes in the faculties at the Latvia University of Life Sciences and Technologies. LBTU transitioned from eight faculties to five:
- Faculty of Economics and Social Development
  - Study programmes:
    - Economics,
    - Business Studies,
    - Entrepreneurship and Business Management,
    - Business Management,
    - Financial Management
- Faculty of Engineering and Information Technologies
  - Study programmes:
    - Agricultural Engineering,
    - Machine Design and Manufacturing,
    - Applied Energetics,
    - Machine Design and Manufacturing,
    - Computer Control and Computer Science,
    - Programming,
    - Information Technologies
- Faculty of Agriculture and Food technology
  - Study programmes:
    - Food Science,
    - Nutrition Science,
    - Catering and Hotel Management,
    - Food Technology
- Faculty of Forest and Environmental Sciences
  - Study programmes:
    - Forestry Science,
    - Wood Materials and Technology,
    - Wood Processing Technology,
    - Sustainable Forestry,
    - Forest Engineering,
    - Civil Engineering and Constructions,
    - Land Surveying and Management,
    - Environmental Science,
    - Landscape Architecture and Planning,
    - Water Management,
    - Environment and Water Management,
    - Environmental Engineering
- Faculty of Veterinary Medicine
  - Study programmes:
    - Veterinary Medicine EQF7 (Bachelor+Masters)

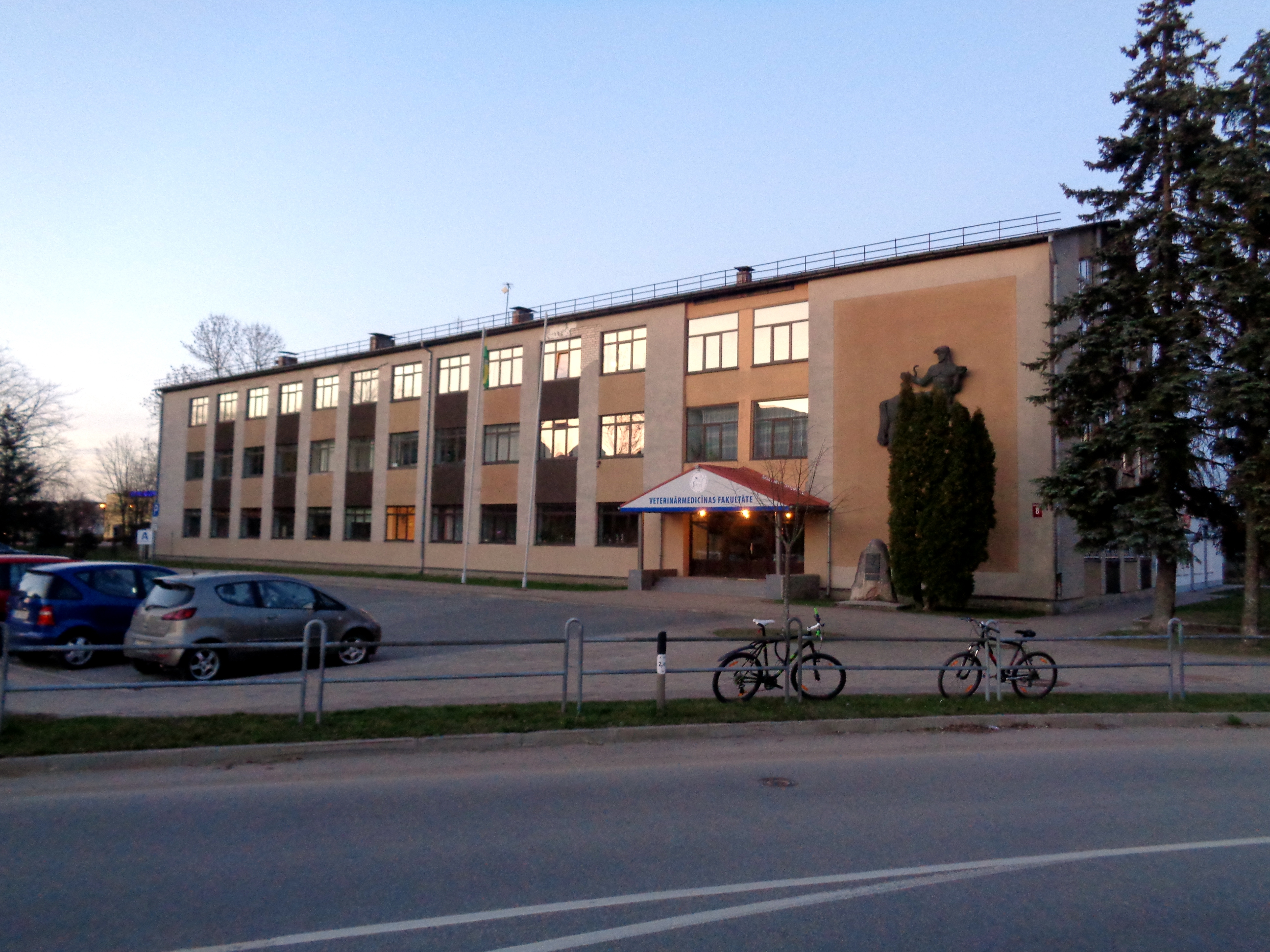
Faculty of Veterinary Medicine

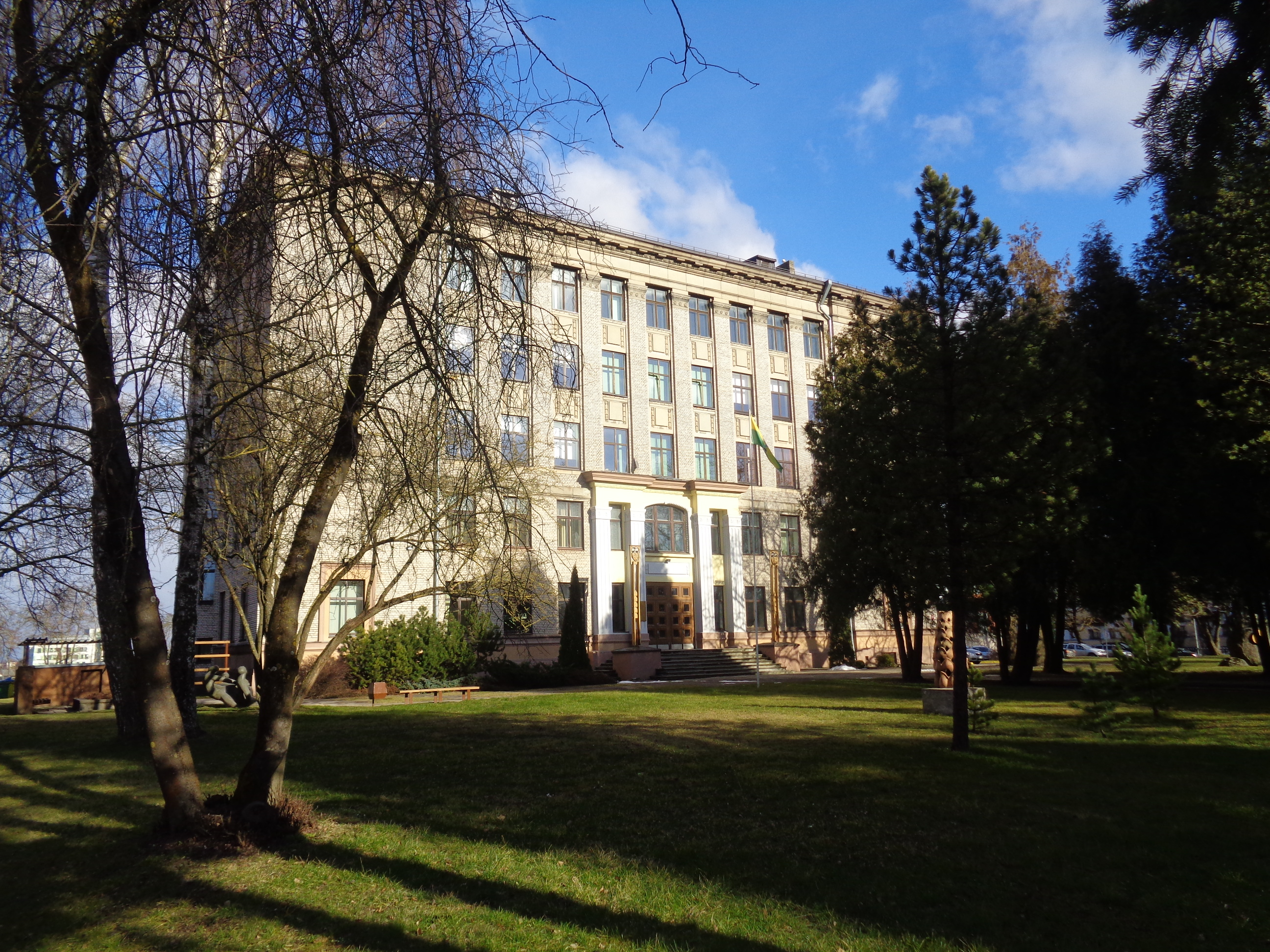
Faculty of Forest and Environmental Sciences

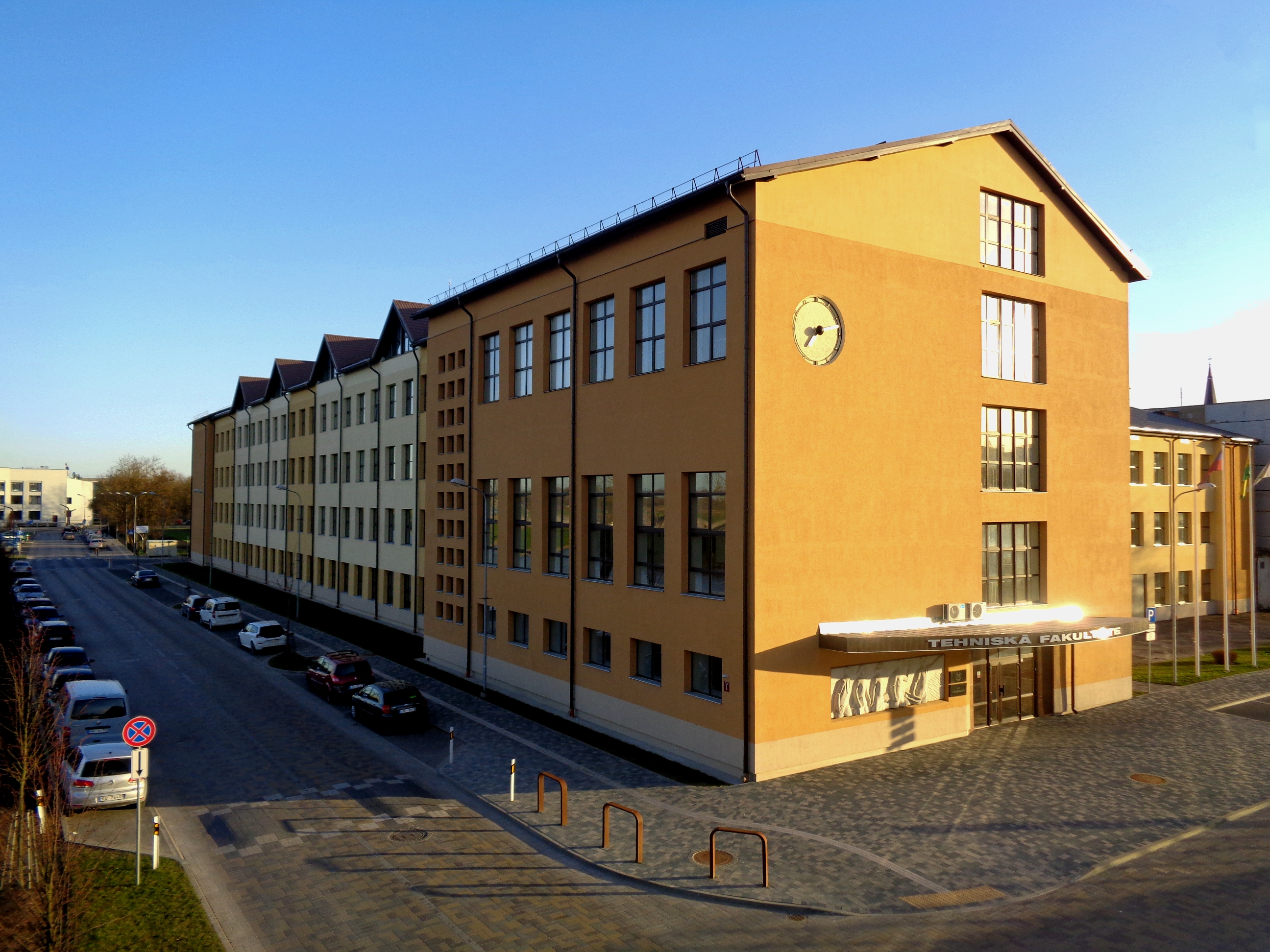
Faculty of Engineering and Information Technologies

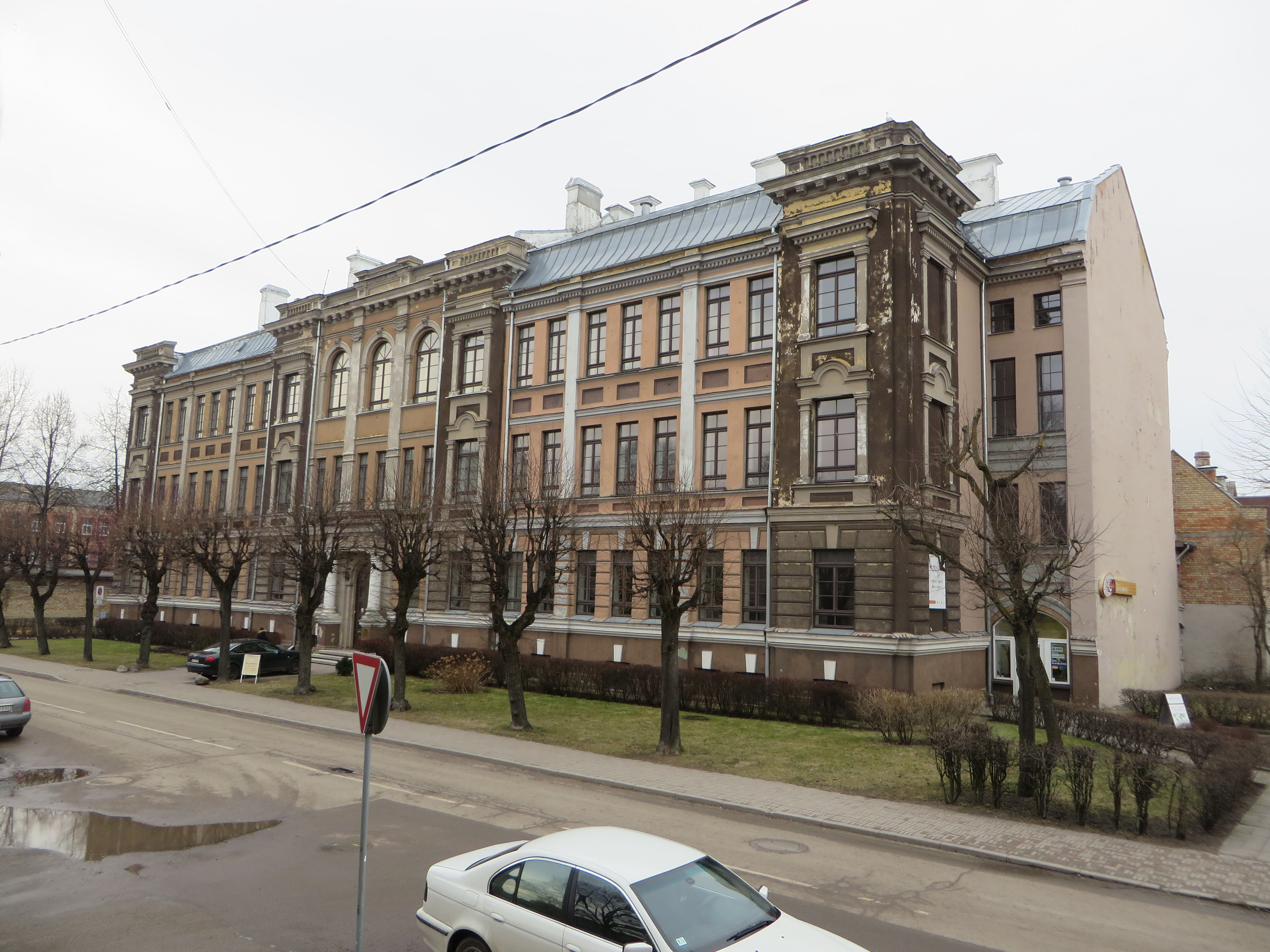
Faculty of Economics and Social Development

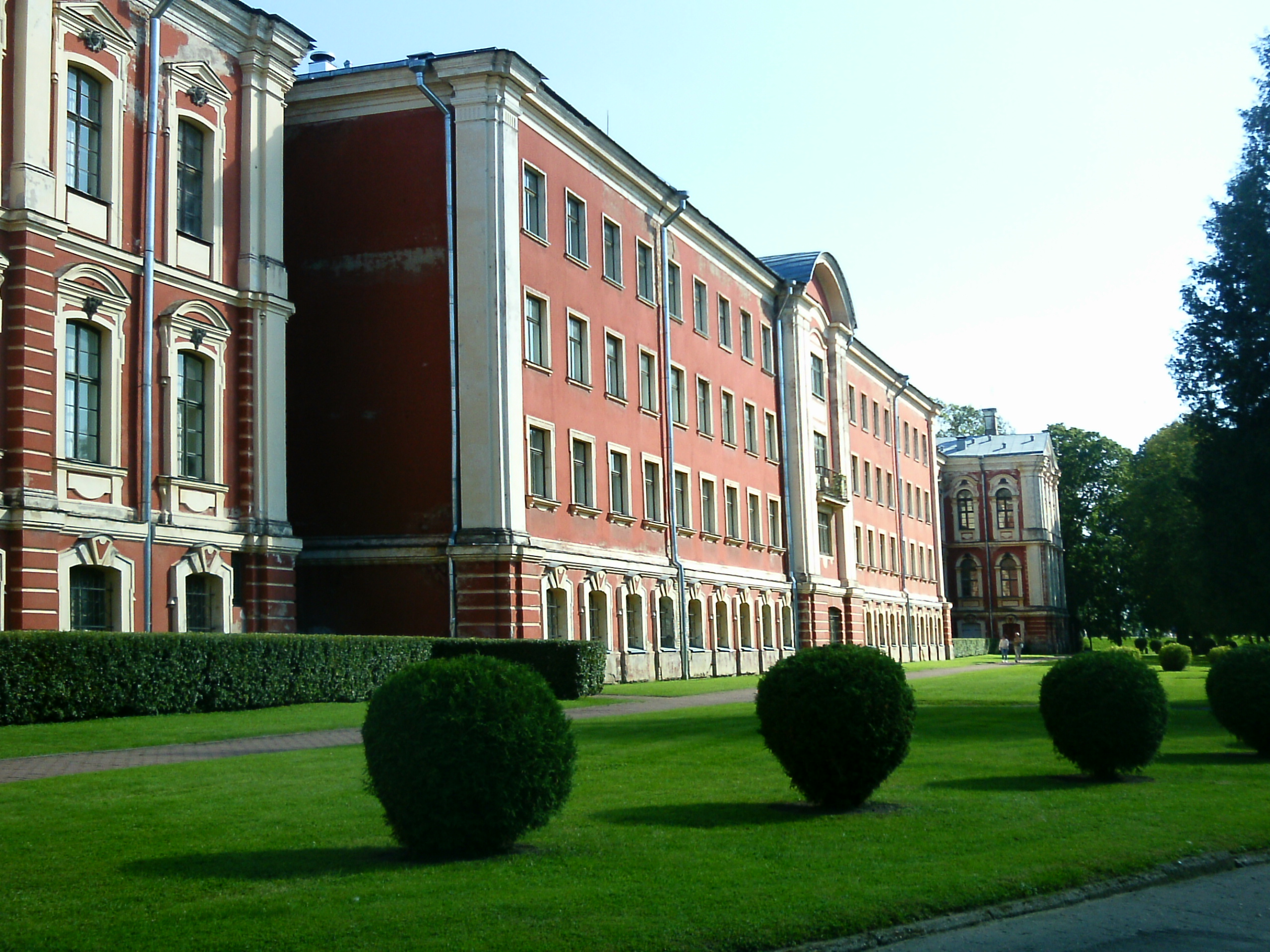
Faculty of Agriculture and Food technology and Faculty of Engineering and Information Technologies

== Rankings ==
Latvia University of Life Sciences (LLU) is ranked in the 1001+ bracket in Times Higher Education World University Rankings 2020. LLU has been ranked 174th among EECA (Eastern Europe and Central Asia) universities.

In the 2025 results, LBTU was placed in the 1501+ group overall, with its strongest performance in the Industry category (25.4 points) and International Outlook (25 points). It also showed improvement in Teaching, scoring 20.3 points—an increase of 4 points from 2024—and in Research Quality (16.6 points) and Research Environment (16.2 points).

This is the second year the ranking has used a revised methodology, under which LBTU has maintained a stable and gradually improving position. Overall, the university's general index score improved to a range between 10.5 and 24.1 points, up from 9.7 to 22.7 in 2024.

== Rectors ==
- Pāvils Kvelde (1939–1940, 1941–1944)
- Pauls Galenieks (1940–1941)
- Jānis Ostrovs (1941)
- Maksis Eglītis (1944)
- Jānis Peive (1944–1950)
- Amālija Cekuliņa (1950–1954)
- Jānis Vanags (1954–1961)
- Pāvils Zariņš (1961–1966)
- Olģerts Ozols (1966–1976)
- Kazimirs Špoģis (1976–1980)
- Viktors Timofejevs (1980–1986)
- Imants Gronskis (1986–1992)
- Voldemārs Strīķis (1992–2002)
- Pēteris Bušmanis (2002–2004)
- Juris Skujāns (2004–2014)
- Irina Pilvere (2014–2024)
- Irina Arhipova (2024–present)

== Notable alumni ==
- Andris Šķēle – Prime Minister of Latvia and industrialist
- Aigars Kalvītis – Prime Minister of Latvia and CEO of Latvijas Gāze
- Roberts Zīle – Member of the European Parliament and co-chairman of the National Alliance
- Atis Slakteris – Minister of Defence of Latvia
- Andris Ārgalis – Mayor of Riga
- Uldis Sesks – Mayor of Liepāja and chairman of the Liepāja Special Economic Zone
- Jānis Urbanovičs – Member of the Saeima and chairman of the Harmony party
- Vilnis Edvīns Bresis – Last Chairman of the Council of Ministers of the Latvian SSR
- Jānis Dūklavs – Minister of Agriculture of Latvia
- Dzintars Jaundžeikars – Minister of the Interior of Latvia
- Dace Reinika – Member of the Saeima and Mayor of Tērvete
