= Marquart von Burbach =

German knight

Marquart or Marquard of Burbach (died 1236) was a knight of the Livonian Brothers of the Sword (from 1210). He came from a noble family in Burbach, a few kilometers east of Marburg in western Germany.

Marquart was commander of Aizkraukle Castle between 1211 and 1231, and ruled Aizkraukle County from his seat. In 1229, he repelled the invasion of the Semigallians and was wounded in a duel with the ruler Viestards. Last mentioned in 1234, it is believed that he, together with many other warlords of the order, fell in the Battle of Saule in 1236.

== Bibliography ==
- Fenske, Lutz; Militzer, Klaus (1993). Ritterbrüder im livländischen Zweig des Deutschen Ordens (in German). OCLC 469897685.
- Benninghoven, Friedrich (1965). Der Orden der Schwertbrüder. Fratres Milicie Christi de Livonia (in German). OCLC 1547012.
