= Namejs Ring =

Traditional Latvian ring

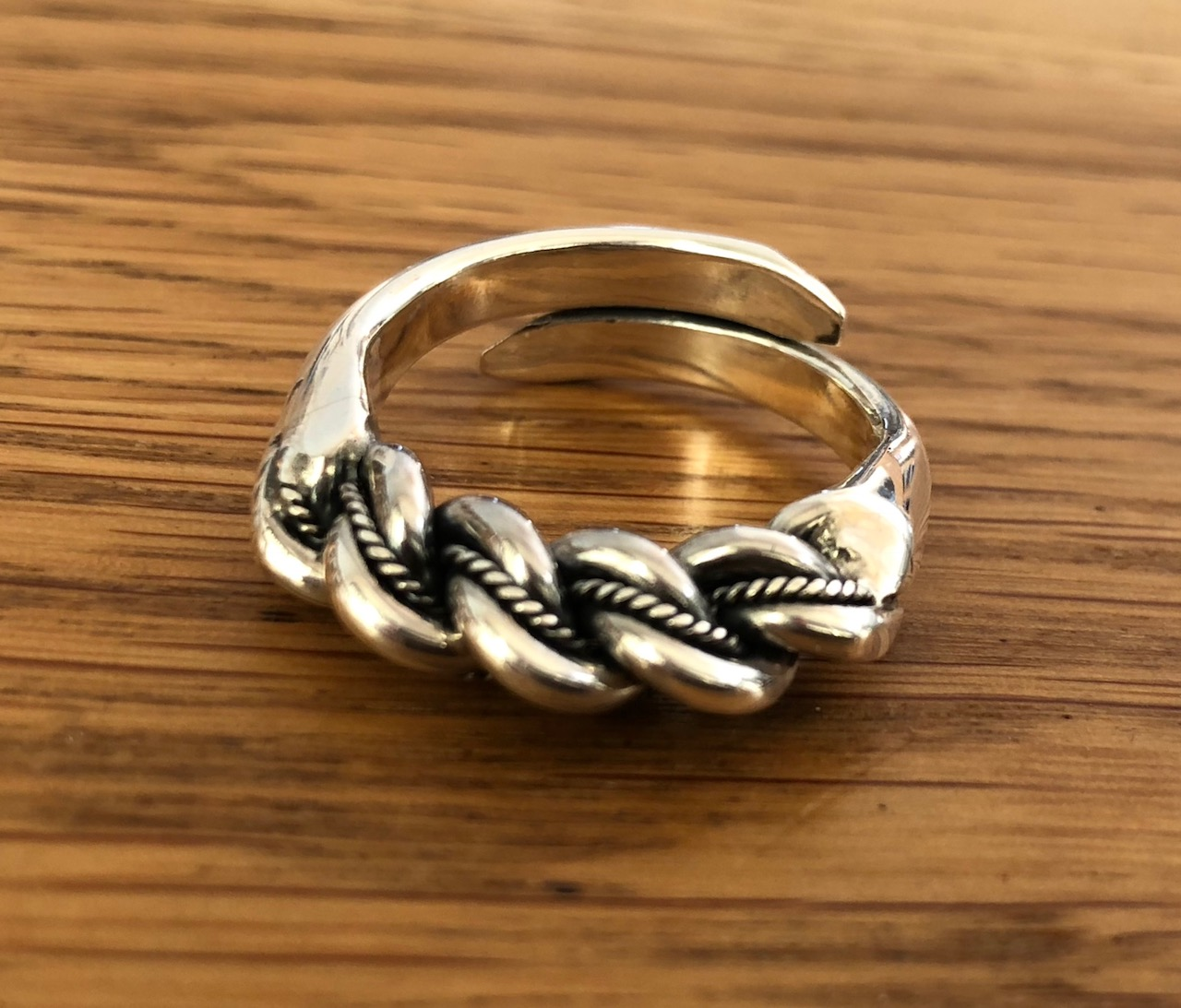
Silver Namejs Ring

The Namejs ring (Latvian: Nameja gredzens) is a traditional Latvian ring which represents Latvian independence, friendship, and trust. It symbolizes the unity of three ancient Latvian lands – Kurzeme, Latgale, and Vidzeme.

The design and customs associated with it originated in ancient Latgalian lands, which is the easternmost of the four historical regions of Latvia. The ring, as currently known, was first produced in the 12th century. The Namejs ring is a common symbol in Latvian culture. In 1928, Aleksandrs Grīns wrote a novel titled Nameja gredzens (“Ring of Namejs”), which popularized the ring and its symbolism. In 2018, Aigars Grauba produced a film called The Pagan King (Latvian: Nameja gredzens), which depicts an alternate version of the ring's legend.

== Description ==
The Namejs ring has become a central figure in Latvian jewelry, due to its design and mythological significance.

In the 20th century, there was an explosion of interest in the Namejs ring in Baltics, both as jewelry and as an icon of Latvian identity. It is mostly worn by men, but in modern times there are also women who wear it. The material of the ring is mostly silver, but it can also be made out of gold or bronze. The classic Namejs ring consists of three main bands woven around each other, but in recent years, more intricate ones have many embellishments, such as smaller twists of silver woven in with the larger bands.

== Origins ==
The ring was first found in ancient Latgalian lands. The name “Namejs” derives from the Semigallian legend about the political and military leader Namejs in the late 13th century. Although this legend has become popular, in reality, these rings date from the late 12th to early 13th century.

It has been discovered that Namejs wasn’t alive when the first rings were made in the 12th century; archeologists found the rings mostly in ancient Latgalian lands, proving that Namejs could not have any connection to the ring. The name "Namejs ring" was not used before the 1920s, when two originals were found in ancient graves of Latgale and they become a popular kind of jewelry to imitate. The Namejs ring is a rare archeologist’s find. It has been determined that it would have been a very expensive item to own in the 12th century, as it is mostly made from silver and the manufacturing process was long and complex.

== Folk legends ==
There are many legends about the origins of the Namejs ring, particularly concerning Namejs, the leader of the Semigallians in the 13th century, who is said to have invented the Namejs design as it is popularly known. According to the legend, Namejs was one of the last warriors to fight against the invasion of the German crusaders into the territory of Latvia. He fled into exile in Lithuania, but as a parting gift, he gave his son a twisted metal ring so that the boy would be recognizable by his father upon return. Namejs’ son was imperiled when the Germans discovered the secret of the ring. The Germans went out in a search of Namejs’ son in order to Christianize him and force him to surrender. It is said that almost all of the Semigallian boys and men made similar rings and wore them in order to protect the boy’s identity.

According to another legend, German crusaders were slowly moving into Latvian territory in the middle ages, taking over tribe after tribe. After a battle lost against German knights, Namejs was forced to retreat to Lithuania together with his family and tribe. There he ordered the rings to be made and gave them to his closest people as a symbol of friendship and trust. The close braids express the solidarity of the Latvian nation.

== Popularization ==
The ring’s popularity has been encouraged by various factors. Latvian writer Aleksandrs Grīns wrote a novel titled Nameja gredzens (“Ring of Namejs”) in 1928. The ring described in the novel is different, but society understood the idea of the Grīns story when it was presented on stage. The unique ring was given the identity and the name that made it an embodiment of the power of the Latvian leader Namejs. In 1936, painter Ludolfs Liberts painted the archeological ring on a finger of his fantasy portrait of Namejs.

Namejs ring was presented to the president Kārlis Ulmanis by his ideologues, developing myths in order to legitimize the leader using pseudo-historic analogies, including positioning Ulmanis as "heir of Namejs".

== Usage and symbolism ==
In the 1930s, the Namejs ring symbolized boys going into manhood. Fathers presented this ring to their sons on the day of their coming of age, and that was the only way to get it. The close bonds symbolized the family and the importance of being united.

Each ring is handmade by a jeweler, individually twisted, and symbolizes an idea about being unique, but in close relationships with others, similar to the individual. It also connected with the possible motto of Namejs, “One for all and everyone for one.”

The Namejs ring has become a central icon of Latvian jewelry. The three twisted silver parts symbolize the unity of three ancient Latvian lands - Kurzeme, Latgale and Vidzeme, that these days constitute the territory of Latvia. The ring is a sign of Latvian identity.

== In culture ==
=== Latvian lats ===
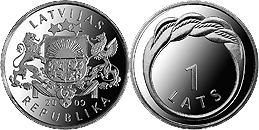
1 Latvian lats with Namejs ring

On June 8, 2009, the Bank of Latvia issued a new coin of 1 Latvian lats with the Namejs ring, which encloses the numeral 1, on the reverse. It was legal tender in the Republic of Latvia until the adoption of the Euro currency in 2014.

The graphic design was made by Ilze Lībiete, and the plaster model by Baiba Šime.

=== Novel ===
Nameja gredzens (Ring of Namejs) is a novel by Aleksandrs Grīns published in 1928 about ancient Semigallian leader Namejs.

In the novel, Namejs fights for independence of Semigallia. It is fictional rather than historical, and is not based on specific facts of Latvian history.

=== Film ===
The Pagan King (Nameja gredzens) is a historical fiction film directed by Latvian film director and producer Aigars Grauba. The story takes place in the 13th century in Semigallia and is about a Semigallian leader Namejs, who, after the death of King Viesturs, receives the Namejs ring (ring of power) and the right to rule, and his fight against the invasion of the German crusaders into the territory of Latvia.

The film was shot from 2014 to 2017 with a total budget of 3 million euros, making it one of the most expensive Latvian films. On January 17, 2018, attendees of the premiere included the President of Latvia Raimonds Vējonis, state officials, politicians, entrepreneurs and film crew.
