= Aleksandrs Grīns =

Latvian author, officer and journalist (1895–1941)

- Born: 15 August 1895; Birži parish, Courland Governorate, Russian Empire (now Latvia)
- Died: 25 December 1941 (aged 46); Astrakhan, Soviet Union
- Occupations: writer, translator, officer
- Spouse: Alīde Grīna
- Writing career
- Genres: Prose, translation

Aleksandrs Grīns (15 August 1895 – 25 December 1941) was a Latvian writer, translator and army officer. He has written many novels and stories, many of them historic. Most of his works were banned in the Soviet Union from 1945 until 1991. He was awarded the Order of the Three Stars (IV and V class) and Order of Viesturs (III class).

== Biography ==
Aleksandrs Grīns was born as Jēkabs Grīns on 15 August 1895 in Birži parish, Courland Governorate. He has studied in a local parish school and later also in Jēkabpils Merchant school and Rūjiena Gymnasium. In 1914 he graduated Realschule in Cēsis. He wanted to study medicine at the University of Tartu but due to the start of First World War he went to Moscow to study at Alekseyevskoye military school. After a few months, he was sent to the front with the rank of praporschik. In 1916 Grīns managed to get permission to join a Latvian Riflemen unit. He was first deployed to a Reserve battalion in Tartu, but was later sent to the front lines near Olaine. During this period, he changed his name from Jēkabs to Aleksandrs.

In 1917 Grīns was seriously wounded during the Battle of Jugla in the first days of September, and he was evacuated to St. Petersburg. After treatment, he was demobilized in April 1918 and returned to his native homestead in Latvia. Later he went to study medicine at the University of Tartu. While in Tartu, he was mobilized into the Soviet Red Army in the beginning of 1919. When the Red Army was retreating from Courland, Grīns deserted in Bauska and joined a Latvian brigade under Colonel Jānis Balodis. After the liberation of Riga, Grīns resumed his medicine studies at the newly established University of Latvia in autumn 1919. In 1924 Grīns was demobilized from the Latvian army with the rank of captain.

After 1920 Grīns worked as a journalist, first in the military newspaper Latvijas Kareivis, and later in Latvis and Brīvā Zeme. In addition, Grīns started to write historical novels and stories. In autumn 1939 Grīns returned to active military service. After the Soviet occupation of Latvia in June 1940, Grīns was sent to a military camp in Litene parish. In June 1941 several hundred Latvian officers from this camp, including Grīns, were arrested by NKVD. Grīns was imprisoned in Riga and interrogated. After Operation Barbarossa started, Grīns was sent to Russia and imprisoned in an Astrakhan prison. In October, he was sentenced to death, and on 25 December he was shot dead in prison.

== Literature ==
Aleksandrs Grīns is known for several successful historical novels. Most notable is the novel "Blizzard of Souls" (Dvēseļu Putenis), where the main protagonist is a young Latvian schoolboy who enlists in a Latvian Riflemen battalion and participates in battles in Latvia and, later, the Russian Civil War. In this novel, he used his own experiences and memories during the First World War. Other notable works are Nameja Gredzens (Ring of Namejs), about ancient Semigallian duke Nameisis, and Tobago, about Courlander colonists of the island in the 17th century. Besides novels, he also translated Erich Maria Remarque's All Quiet on the Western Front and Ludwig Renn's War [de] into Latvian.
