= Zelmeņi =

Village in Latvia

- Village
- Zelmeņi's location in Latvia
- Coordinates: 56°27′3.53″N 23°20′58.03″E
- Country: Latvia
- Municipality: Dobele
- Parish: Tērvete

Population (2015)
  - Total: 338

Zelmeņi is a village in the Tērvete Parish of Dobele Municipality in the Semigallia region of Latvia. It is located on the banks of the Tērvete and Svepaine rivers.
