= Tērvete =

Village in Latvia

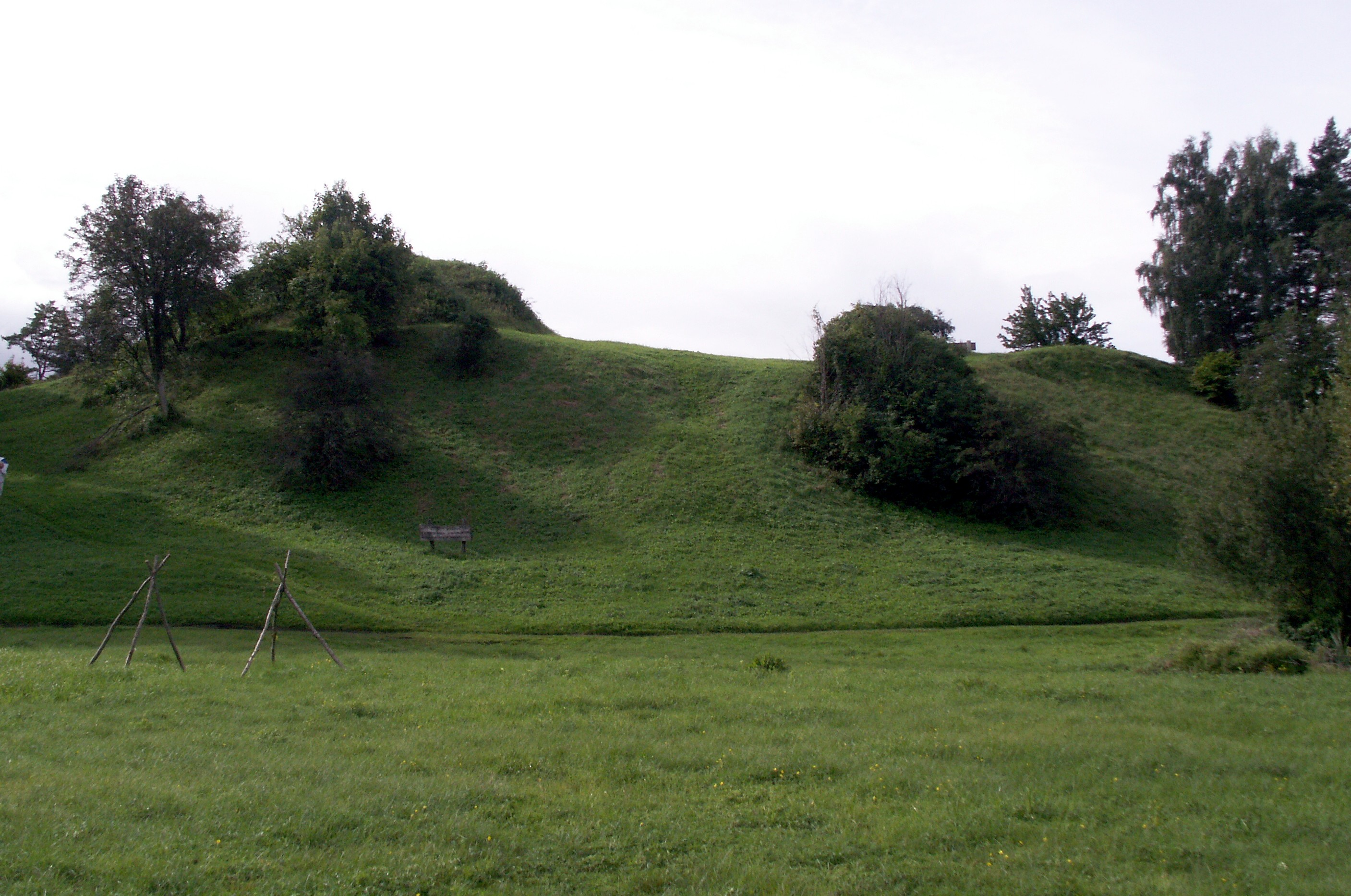
Hillfort of Semigallian dukes Viestards and Nameisis (13th century)

Tērvete (liv. Terwenden, German: Hofzumberge) is a village in Tērvete Parish, Dobele Municipality in the Semigallia region of Latvia. It is famous for the historic hillfort built for the kings of Western Semigallia (Zemgale) in the Middle Ages.

== History ==
According to popular legend the Semigallian king Nameisis made a ring called the "namejs" so he could be identified by his family. But his enemies got hold of this information and sought the ring to kill the king (during a war) to have victories. The villagers also created these rings in order to protect the King. And for this reason Namejs is a popular ring for Latvians. In 1287, the Semigallian castle was destroyed by the Livonian Order. In 1335, the wooden castle Hof zum Berg Kalnamuiža was built by the Order of Livonia near to the site of the former Semigallian fortifications, destroyed by the Lithuanian forces in 1345.

A second legend describes the story of the German crusaders slowly moving into Latvian territory in the Middle Ages, taking over tribe after tribe. Namejs, the Semigallian king, was the last to subdue to the crusaders' power. Namejs and his people left their land and went south into Lithuanian territory. Namejs didn't want his people to forget their heritage and their origins and had the Namejs Ring designed for all of his people so that they could identify each other and have a common bond. Now it is a popular ring amongst Latvians that live outside of Latvia because it shows their love for Latvia and recognition of their heritage.

=== Archaeological excavations ===
In 1819, K. F. Watson declared the hillfort on right bank of Tērvete river to be the site of the legendary Tērvete castle described in chronicles from the Middle Ages. The hillfort was excavated by August Bielenstein between 1866 and 1892. The expedition of the Latvian Museum of History led by E. Brīvkalne carried out excavations in 1952–53 and 1954–59.

== Tērvete Air Base ==
Tērvete Air Base
- IATA: none; ICAO: none

Summary
- Airport type: Military
- Operator: abandoned
- Location: Tērvete / Kalnamuiža
- Elevation AMSL: 151 ft / 46 m
- Coordinates: 56°29′N 023°25′E
- Interactive map of Tērvete Air Base

Runways
| Direction | Length | | Surface |
| Direction | m | ft | Surface |
|---|---|---|---|
| | 2,000 | 6,562 |

Tērvete is also the site of an airfield, located 2 km (1 mi) east of Kalnamuiža. It is a minor airfield, probably used during World War II. It appears on American Department of Defense Operational Navigation Charts from the 1980s, it was an even field suitable for plane landing/takeoff in case of eventual war.
