= Max Kinnings =

English novelist and screenwriter

Max Kinnings is an English novelist and screenwriter.

== Career ==
Prior to writing full-time, Kinnings worked in the music and entertainment industries for twelve years devising advertising and marketing campaigns for music festivals, tours, comedy shows and West End theatre productions. His first novel, Hitman, was published in 2000. A comedy thriller about a drug-crazed private detective who is hired as a contract killer by an eccentric old woman with paranoid delusions, it was described by The Times as "a highly accomplished, confident first novel". It was read by Kenneth Cranham on BBC Radio 4. Alongside the British and commonwealth edition, it was also published in the US, Bulgaria and Russia.

The Fixer was published in 2002. A more ambitious novel than its predecessor, it tells the story of a showbusiness agent and publicist and his efforts to turn a notorious serial killer into a celebrity. Described by the Daily Mirror as "fascinatingly off the wall...a funny and stylish thriller" it was subsequently published in the US in 2003. Having started to develop screenplays a couple of years previously, a collaboration with actor/comedian, Rik Mayall, began in 2004 and resulted in Max co-writing, as an uncredited ghost-writer, Rik's spoof autobiography, Bigger than Hitler – Better than Christ which spent six weeks in the Sunday Times bestseller chart in 2005.

A number of screenwriting projects followed with commissions from various television and film producers including Granada Television. In 2009, Max co-wrote the musical, Hooked, which had a short London theatre run prior to transferring to the Edinburgh Fringe. In the same year, he started lecturing at Brunel University where is now Head of Subject in Creative Writing.

In June 2011, Max was commissioned by Quercus Publishing, to write two thriller novels featuring the hostage negotiator, Ed Mallory. The first novel, Baptism, was published in July 2012 and was followed by "Sacrifice" in 2013. The feature film, Act of Grace, co-written with Alan Field and Max's long-time collaborator and friend, Marc Pye, was released on DVD in May 2012. Other feature films in development include, Alleycats, written by Max with Ian Bonhôte of Pulse Films due to direct, and an adaptation of Baptism with producer/director, Phil Hawkins.

== Biography ==
Max Kinnings was born in Boningale in Shropshire in 1966. He attended Shrewsbury School before moving to London at the age of 18 to study criminology as part of a Social Science degree at the Polytechnic of Central London where he also pursued his childhood ambition to write fiction. Having lived in London for twenty-five years, in 2009, Max moved with his family to Oxford.

Kinnings holds a PhD in Creative Writing from Brunel University. As of 2026 he is Reader in Creative Writing at Brunel.

== Books ==
- Sacrifice, Quercus, 2013
- Baptism, Quercus, 2012
- Bigger than Hitler – Better than Christ, HarperCollins, 2005, with Rik Mayall
- The Fixer, Hodder & Stoughton, 2001
- Hitman, Hodder & Stoughton, 2000
- claustrofobia

== Film ==
- The Pagan King, Platforma Film, 2018, with Aigars Grauba
- Baptism, Philm Company, 2014
- Alleycats, Elephant Gun Films/Pulse Films, 2013
- Act of Grace, Embrace Productions/High Fliers Films 2012, with Marc Pye and Alan Field

== Drama ==
- Hooked, Polly Coco Productions, 2009, with Nick Hale and Matthew James
