= Baptism (novel) =

2012 novel by Max Kinnings

- First edition
- Author: Max Kinnings
- Language: English
- Set in: London
- Published: London
- Publisher: Quercus
- Publication date: 2012
- Publication place: United Kingdom
- Pages: 488
- ISBN: 9781780871813
- Dewey Decimal: 823.92

Baptism is a 2012 crime novel by British author Max Kinnings. A movie based on the book has also been commissioned.

== Synopsis ==
The novel is mostly set on London Underground and follows radical religious extremists, led by Tommy Denning a psychopathic former soldier, who are seeking to "baptise" the train passengers by flooding the train. Denning, armed with a gun, hijacks the train between Leicester Square tube station and Tottenham Court Road tube station. Blind DCI Ed Mallory is the lead hostage negotiator and has to deal with the situation along with a rogue MI5 operative.

== Reception ==
In The Times the book was praised as "a tense blockbuster with worryingly credible characters" while in the Peterborough Evening Telegraph the book was described as having "more twists than a bagful of snakes – and as much bite...A must read." In Publishers Weekly the reviewer wrote that the book was "not for the faint of heart...Kinnings's thriller propels readers into the murk of London's Underground", while in Eurocrime the book received a mixed review with the author writing: "for me the characters...are thinly realised and almost caricatured. These factors together with the book's casual but graphic violence kept me at a distance. If you are a fan of suspense, extreme events and extreme characters and you don't mind vividly described bloody action, Baptism could be your kind of thriller. But sadly – it's not mine."
