= Bigger than Hitler – Better than Christ =

Semi-autobiographical book by Rik Mayall

- Author: Rik Mayall
- Publication date: September 2005
- Pages: 352
- ISBN: 978-0-007-20728-2

Bigger than Hitler – Better than Christ (sometimes prefixed The Rik Mayall) is a 2005 semi-autobiographical book by Rik Mayall (and partially ghostwritten by Max Kinnings) written in exaggerated character. The title humorously refers to his career being longer than Adolf Hitler's (who was dictator of Germany for 12 years), and to him being in a coma for 5 days after his 1998 quad bike accident (compared to Jesus, who rose from the dead after 3 days).

== Description ==
The book is written in character, and in the book Rik claims that he invented alternative comedy with The Young Ones, saved Rock and Roll with the song Living Doll, brought down the Thatcher administration with The New Statesman, and rescued the British film industry with the "vast revenues" generated by Drop Dead Fred.

== Reception ==
It received mostly positive reviews on release, with a reviewer noting the highlight as being the letters written by Mayall to various celebrities, producers, and politicians.

On the 1 June 2024, "Rik Mayall, Panglobal Phenomenon" was broadcast on BBC Radio 4, primarily focusing on the book. Mayall's former comedy partner Adrian Edmondson and actor Benedict Cumberbatch would go on to read Mayall's 1984 letter to Bob Geldof included in the book for the Letters of Note: Music audiobook and a Letters Live fundraiser event, respectively.
