= Piczo =

Social network and blogging website

Piczo.com
- Company type: Blog company
- Industry: Social networking
- Founded: 2003
- Founder: Jim Conning
- Defunct: November 2012
- Headquarters: San Francisco, California
- Key people: Christofer Båge (CEO of current Piczo owner PMGcom Publishing AB), Mattias Miksche (board member, PMGcom Publishing AB), Daniel Lövquist (board member, PMGcom Publishing AB)
- Website: piczo.com

Piczo was a social networking and blogging website for teens. It was founded in 2003 by Jim Conning in San Francisco, California. Early investors included Catamount, Sierra Ventures, U.S. Venture Partners, and Mangrove Capital Partners.

In March 2009, Piczo was acquired by Stardoll (Stardoll AB with CEO Mattias Miksche). After the acquisition Piczo was led by Stardoll's CEO Mattias Miksche and his Stardoll team.

In September 2012, Piczo.com was acquired by Posh Media Group (PMGcom Publishing AB with CEO Christofer Båge).

In November 2012, Piczo.com shut down.

Their eponymous service, also called Piczo (Piczo.com), was an online photo website builder and community, which was for the generation of free advertising-supported websites. Launched in 2005 Piczo allowed users to add images, text, guestbooks, message boxes, videos, music and other content to their site using plain text and HTML. Partners included YouTube, VideoEgg, Photobucket, Flock, Yahoo & PollDaddy. When it began, the company's focus was individual web-page design, and blogs were not included as a feature. In addition to the website development aspect of the site, Piczo once had a User Generated Content repository (the Piczo Zone) where users can browse, post, and consume content that they or others have used on their site. Later on, Piczo remodelled the entire site, and this along with many other features were no longer available. One of the features that stayed is "The Board" where Piczo informs users about HTML and Internet safety, though most pages are designed for the old Piczo. In August 2010 Piczo announced "Piczo Plus", a feature that allowed users to buy an "ad-free" site.

As of 2026, a new Piczo website was launched, hinting at a possible revival of the service. The current home page allows to request access via email, and to enter an access code for entry.

== Popularity ==
Piczo saw around 10 million unique visitors a month. While primarily offering services in English and German, Piczo was also available in French, Spanish, Romanian, Russian, Japanese, and Korean BETA versions.

The service was very popular with a teenage audience in Britain, much like Bebo. Its popularity waned as social networking services such as Facebook, with the ability to create a profile, began to grow more popular than those where one would create a full-blown website.
