= Dace Reinika =

Latvian politician

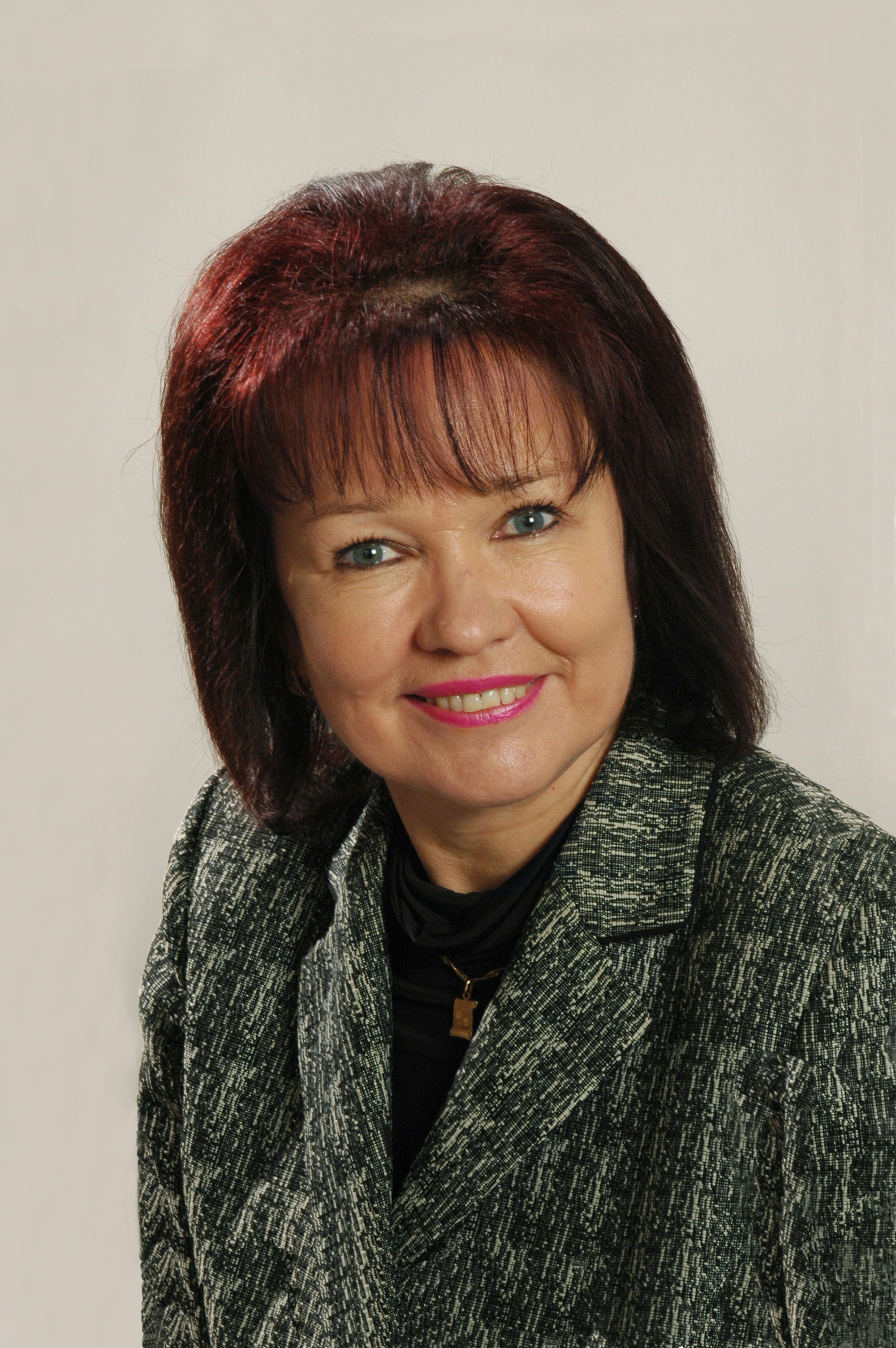
Dace Reinika

Dace Reinika (born September 23, 1958) is a Latvian politician who was a deputy of the 10th Saeima and who was the last Chair of the Council of Tērvete Municipality from 2013 to 2021, when the municipality was merged into Dobele Municipality.

She was elected as a member of the Mūsu mājas ir te ('Our Home Is Here") electoral list, but is a member of the Latvian Farmers' Union.

In 2021, she was elected to the Dobele Municipality Council.
