= Tērvete Parish =

Parish of Latvia

- parish of Latvia
- Coat of arms

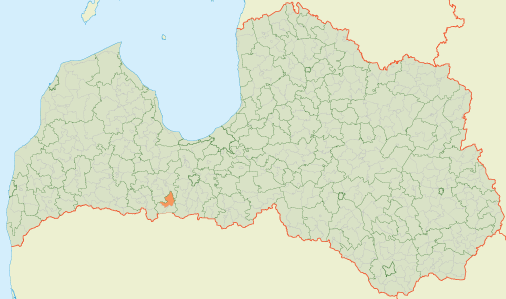
- 56°28′36″N 23°20′28″E
- Country: Latvia

Area
  - Total: 92.52 km^{2} (35.72 sq mi)
  - Land: 90.3 km^{2} (34.9 sq mi)
  - Water: 2.22 km^{2} (0.86 sq mi)

Population (1 January 2024)
  - Total: 1,811
  - Density: 20/km^{2} (51/sq mi)

Tērvete Parish (Latvian: Tērvetes pagasts) is an administrative unit of Dobele Municipality in the Semigallia region of Latvia. At the beginning of 2014, the population of the parish was 2009. The administrative center is Zelmeņi village.

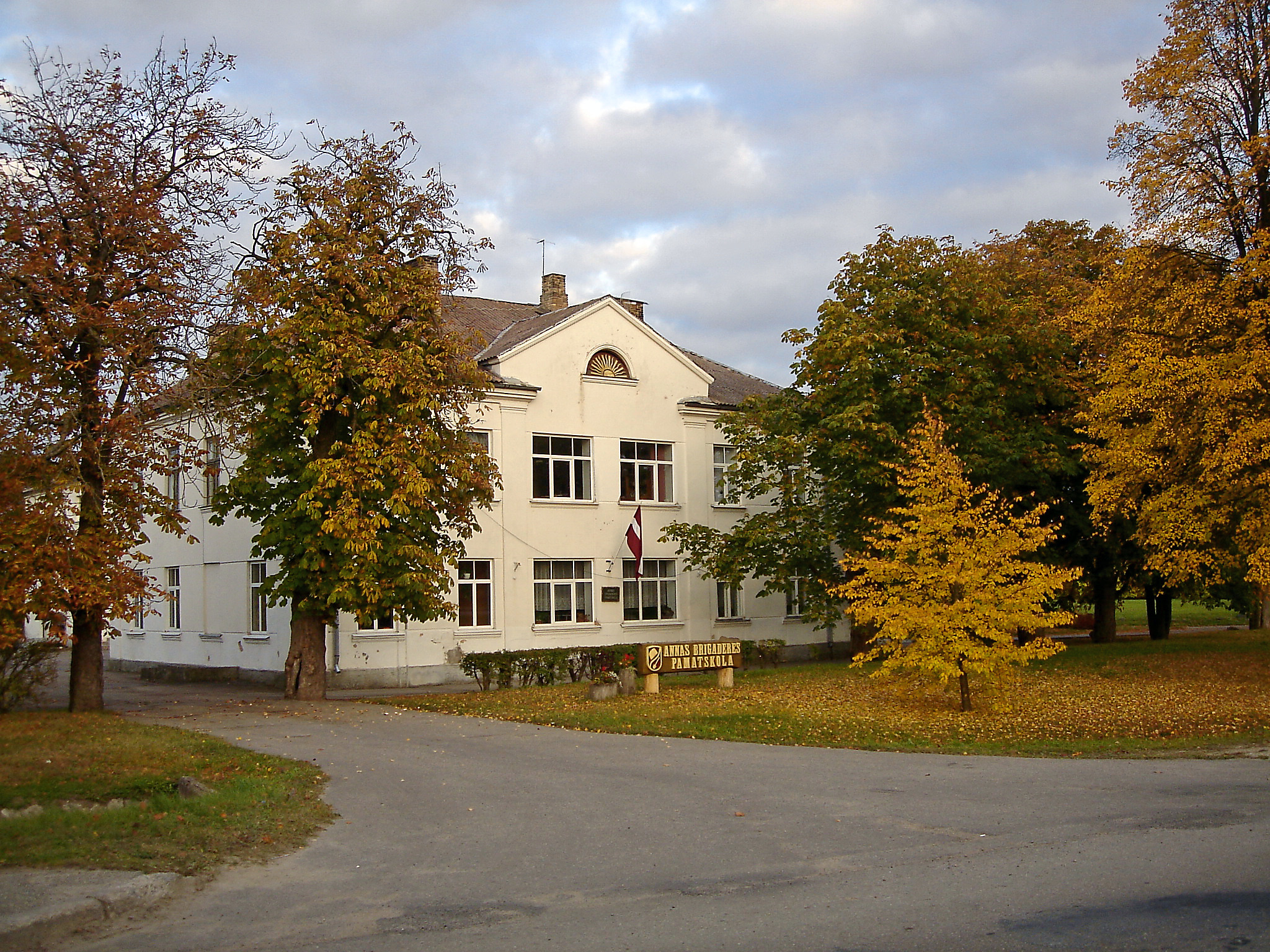
Kroņauce primary school

== Towns, villages and settlements of Tērvete Parish ==
- Klūnas
- Kroņauce
- Mežmalieši
- Tērvete
- Zelmeņi

== See also ==
- Alberts Kviesis
