= Stardoll =

- Developer: Glorious Games Group AB
- Platform: OS Independent browser game
- Release: 2004
- Genres: Fashion, Style, Social
- Mode: Free Account Superstar Account (Membership) Royalty Account (Premium membership)

Stardoll is a browser-based dress-up game from Glorious Games. One of the world's largest online fashion communities, Stardoll had reached over 400 million users as of January 2016.

Focusing on an audience that is often overlooked by the gaming industry, Stardoll is open to everyone but focuses on providing a place for teens and young women to express their creativity and manage their own virtual fashion world, engage in creative social activities with other players around the world, and participate in mini games and challenges.

== History ==
Stardoll first appeared as a personal website featuring paper dolls from Finnish creator and enthusiast, Liisa Wrang. Inspired by a childhood passion for paper dolls, Wrang started drawing dolls and accompanying wardrobes and taught herself web design. Her personal homepage rapidly became a popular destination for teens. In 2004, with the help of her son, she upgraded the site and called it Paperdoll Heaven.

In 2005, Stardoll was launched as a browser game under the guidance of CEO Mattias Miksche. The game was incredibly successful and served as a starting place for some of Sweden's top tech industry performers, such as Spotify founder Daniel Ek and Lifesum co-founder Marcus Gners and Henrik Torstensson.

Stardoll merged with the publishing site Piczo in March 2009, when the latter was acquired by Stardoll. Both sites continued to operate as separate social networking sites, however, they formed (in part) the larger Stardoll brand.

In May 2016, Stardoll celebrated its ten-year anniversary. Also in 2016, Mattias Miksche bought out his partner investors and placed Stardoll in the hands of gaming industry veteran, Thomas Lindgren. "He knows everything about the gaming industry and was the first person to help me understand that Stardoll is a gaming company," said Mattias Miksche of Thomas Lindgren. Miksche now serves the company as acting chairman of the board.

Under new management, Stardoll AB changed its name to Glorious Games Group AB and has expanded its offerings to include Stardoll, mobile app Stardoll Stylista, and fashion retail and social networking app and website Clique.

With Flash support ending in 2020, many browser-based games died with it. Stardoll's response to this was a downloadable launcher, allowing users to continue playing the game. It is also playable through other browsers that continue to support Flash, but in most browsers is missing vital features due to the lack of Flash support. As of 2026, Stardoll is still putting out regular releases.

== Concept ==
On Stardoll, players can create their own virtual doll ("MeDoll") or choose from a collection of celebrity dolls to dress up in various styles of makeup and clothing. Players can customise the appearance of their "MeDoll", changing elements such as skin tone and facial features.

Players use in-game currency to purchase additional clothing, beauty, and decor items from Starplaza, the game's virtual shopping plaza. The Stardoll membership is free, and most of the game's core features are entirely free of charge. All members can earn Starpoints (experience points) and Starcoins (one of two in-game currencies) by doing different activities, competing in competitions, and completing challenges in the game.

While the base game is free-to-play, there are two tiers of membership available for purchase in the game. The first is Superstar, and is only available for purchase with real money. Superstar membership allows (among other things) users to access unlocked "MeDoll" customisation options, stores in the Starplaza, and the ability to sell items in the Starbazaar. Superstar players also receive Stardollars (the premium in-game currency) with their membership purchase. Similarly, the second membership tier, Royalty, is only able to be obtained with real money. Previously, members were required to maintain Superstar status for 12 months before being automatically upgraded to Royalty, however, an "Instant Royalty Pack" was later made available for purchase. The "Instant Royalty Pack" allows players to immediately obtain Royalty status, access to the Royalty Club discussion board, and unlock Royalty-only stores.

Stardoll appeals to a wide cross section of users, but their core membership consists of boys and girls from the ages of 13 and upwards. Stardoll was developed with an emphasis on self-expression through fantasy and fashion.

=== Competitions ===
Users are able to participate in a range of in-game competitions, the primary being the daily Covergirl competition. Every day, the new winner is the "MeDoll" who obtains the most votes by other users who visit their suite.

Other competitions include National Covergirl (the highest number of votes for a "MeDoll" per country), Best Album, Best Scenery, and design awards.

== Real-life collaborations ==
Throughout the game's lifespan, Stardoll has collaborated with several fashion and beauty brands, translating real clothing, homewares and beauty into virtual items.

Some of the earlier collaborations included Donna Karan New York (DKNY) and Sephora, launched on the site in September 2007. Miksche cited a "craving for real brands on the site", stating "we've been getting mail from our users from day one."

Some of these collaborations also involved partnering with popular celebrities. In August 2011, as part of the Rebecca Bonbon promotional campaign run on Stardoll, Jennette McCurdy hosted a live video event on the site.

In November 2011, Stardoll teamed up with Mattel to release a Stardoll line of Barbie dolls. The "Stardoll by Barbie" collection featured eight fashion dolls, based on four of the most popular virtual Stardoll stores in Starplaza: "Fallen Angel", "Bonjour Bizou", and "Pretty 'n Love". The fourth store, "Doll Space" was a brand-new store, launched specifically to complement the "Stardoll by Barbie" line. Inspired by Stardoll avatars, "Stardoll by Barbie" dolls came packaged mirroring the signature Stardoll poses, and contained a gift card for in-game membership and Stardollars.

In October 2012, Stardoll launched a virtual Harrods store. The store contained items from youth collections of brands including Chloe, John Galliano, and Sonia Rykiel. The collaboration was integrated with the Harrods website and brand, including mood books that linked to the external store's site and social media touchpoints. The head of childrenswear at Harrods, Torly Grimshaw, was quoted saying “This is a wonderful opportunity to raise our profile in the virtual fashion world, at the same time as enabling our younger customers to interact with their favourite brands in a completely new way.”

Other collaborations have included Mawi, a London-based luxury jewellery brand in April 2012, and JCPenney, who launched a range of offline Stardoll clothing and accessories for girls.

=== Novels and tie-ins ===
Several novels aimed at young readers have been platformed on Stardoll. In September 2010, Stardoll and Random House Children's Books launched Mortal Kiss, a paranormal mystery novel complimented by an interactive story on the website. It delivered new reading material daily, and users were able to access a map of Winter Hill, shop items from the story (including virtual clothing) from the Mortal Kiss store, and dress up characters.

A series of Stardoll-inspired graphic novels were also published. Authored and illustrated by JayJay Jackson and published by Papercutz in 2013, Secrets & Dreams follows five best friends navigating the fashion world. The cover features art from a Stardoll suite. The subsequent graphics novels in the series were The Secret of the Star Jewel and Project Runaway.

== Glorious Games ==
Glorious Games Group AB started in 2005 when the company was known as "Stardoll AB" and focused on one single product: Stardoll.com. Glorious Games is focused on creating games for young women, an audience usually overlooked by the gaming industry.

Led by CEO Thomas Lindgren, Glorious Games expanded its offerings by creating three mobile apps: Stardoll Stylista, Fashion Inc., and Clique, a social marketplace. Two mobile and tablet versions of Stardoll were previously available on Apple iOS and Android: Stardoll Access, and Stardoll - Fame Fashion & Friends. Support for the apps has since ended.

=== Stardoll Stylista ===
Launched in 2016, Stardoll Stylista was a mobile app available for both iOS and Android. The game allowed users to create and customize an avatar using beauty and fashion options. The avatar then followed a career track to become a world-famous stylist by styling friends' and other players' avatars for various social and career events. Users also voted on various beauty and fashion looks by submitting their avatar to a daily competition.

The game was free to play but offered in-app purchases. Support for the game has since ended.

=== Fashion Inc. ===
Fashion Inc. was a mobile app available for both iOS. Players created and operated their own fashion house, making important decisions regarding design, tailor, and marketing. Support for the game has since ended.

=== Clique ===
Clique was an app and website offering social fashion resale released by Glorious Games.

Clique connected users with similar fashion interests and allowed them to create cliques, member groups for buyers and sellers interested in similar styles or fashions. Users could create and lead a Clique group and receive a percentage of items sold within their group. The system was designed to offer sales incentives and the potential for micro business development to active users. Support for the game has since ended.
