= Viestards =

- Duke of Semigallia
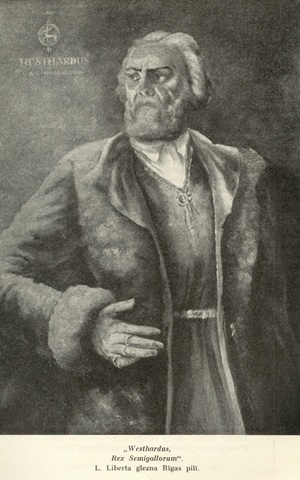
- Painting of Viestards by Ludolfs Liberts in Riga Castle, 1936
- Reign: until 1230
- Born: 12th century
- Died: 1230

Viestards (also Viesthard, Vesthardus, Viesturs; Died 1230) was a Semigallian duke in the 13th century, referred to as King Vester (Old High German: konic Vesters).

== Life ==
His capital was Tērvete hillfort. During the first decades of the 13th century he was allied with the Livonian Brothers of the Sword against Lithuanians, who looted Semigallia on several occasions.

In 1205, joint forces of Semigallians and crusaders defeated Lithuanians and killed duke Žvelgaitis. In 1208 Viestards led a united Semigallian and crusader army into Lithuania but was heavily defeated.

In 1219 Viestards came into conflict with German bishop Albert when German crusaders placed their garrison in Semigallian castle of Mežotne. Viestards unsuccessfully attacked Mežotne but managed to defeat the reinforcement of crusaders coming on Lielupe river after that crusaders left Mežotne. Viestards became an enemy of the Livonian Brothers of the Sword and made an alliance with his neighbors, the Samogitians. Together they fought against the crusaders.

In 1225 Viestards allowed William of Modena to preach in Semigallia however he refused to accept Christianity. In 1228 Semigallian forces under Viestards joined the Curonians in their attack against main crusader stronghold- Riga. However they were unsuccessful in storming the city. In 1229 Viestards led semigallian revenge raid in crusader lands around Aizkraukle where he had a duel with komtur of Aizkraukle Marquart von Burbach.

Viestards died in 1230, but the Semigallians still were not conquered until the end of the 13th century. Viestards never accepted Christianity and accepted only one monk in Semigallia as a preacher.

Although in Rhymed Chronicle Viestards is referred as king of Semigallia today it is believed that he reigned only in western part of Semigallia with a centre in Tērvete. Eastern part of Semigallia with a centre in Mežotne hillfort most likely was not under Viestards rule until 1219. After Viestards death in 1230 area around Mežotne fell in the hands of German crusaders.

== Legacy ==
The Order of Viesturs (Vesthardus Rex) was founded in 1938 to commemorate the spirit of independence of the people of ancient Latvia.
