= Tradera =

Tradera online-marketplace company

Tradera Marketplace AB
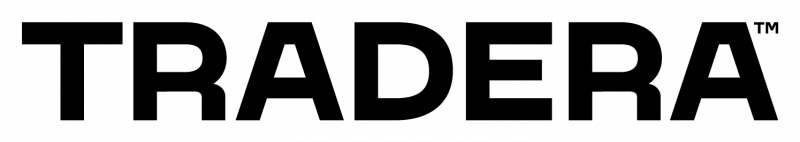
- Type: Private
- Industry: E-commerce, Recommerce
- Founded: 1999; 27 years ago
- Headquarters: Stockholm, Sweden
- Area served: Worldwide
- Key people: Erik Grohman (CEO)
- Products: Second-hand goods and collectibles
- Revenue: ▲€56.7 million (2025)
- Net income: ▲€7.5 million (2025)
- Number of employees: 60
- Website: Official website

Tradera.com is an online marketplace based in Stockholm, Sweden. With its 3,6 million members, 6 million weekly visits and more than 3 million listings at any given point (2024), it's the largest marketplace in the Nordics for sustainable shopping. Items are sold from both private consumers and businesses and are ranging from fashion and interior design to tech and collectibles. Although Tradera welcomes members from all over the world, most are from within the EU and Sweden. Tradera was originally based completely on auctions, but today visitors can purchase both new and second hand items through auctions as well as fixed price listings. Tradera was founded in 1999 but was acquired by eBay Inc. in 2006, which already owned the financial tech company PayPal. When eBay and PayPal were separated in 2015, Tradera became part of PayPal. Since PayPal's sale of Tradera in 2021, Tradera has once again become a Swedish company.

== History ==
Tradera was founded in 1999 with Daniel Kaplan as CEO. The objective was to create a service to decrease the distance between collectors in Europe who wanted to trade various types of exclusive jewelry. It was originally intended to be a small project but investors became interested and invested in the company, which led to rapidly increasing expansion plans. However, after about a year in a luxurious office at Norrmalmstorg in Stockholm the company ran out of money as a result of the IT bubble bursting.

In 2003, the company had regained its strong position and in 2004 it had about 400 000 members. In April 2006 the company was acquired by eBay Inc. for 365 million SEK, and in 2011 the member count was up to 2,5 million. When eBay and PayPal split in 2015, Tradera became a part of PayPal. Since PayPal's sale of Tradera in 2021, Tradera has once again become a Swedish company.

== Items ==
Millions of items are listed on Tradera, in categories such as collectibles, clothing, music, electronics and art. From having previously focused on private consumer-to-consumer auctions, the service now accommodates both private and commercial sellers. Although the service is commonly referred to as an online auction service, it is also possible to buy and sell items for fixed prices. The company has previously collaborated with various organisations, such as Röda korset, Wateraid, Musikhjälpen and Cancerfonden. In 2021 an initiative named "Donera med Tradera" was started in order to raise money for charities. Since 2017 members have collectively raised more than 35 million Swedish crowns to charities.

As opposed to the major competing service in the Swedish market, the majority of items sold are delivered to the buyer through postal or delivery services, and both freight and payment solutions are integrated in the platform.

== Security ==
To enhance security, a system is used where buyers and sellers rate each other on a scale from one to five in various categories associated with the transaction. There is also the option to leave personal comments about the deal. Tradera recommends that buyers check the seller's previous ratings before making a purchase. In 2016, Tradera introduced the option to perform identity verification to ensure that the account is being used by the person who registered it.

A popular way for buyers to ensure a secure transaction is through Tradera's included Buyer Protection, which automatically provides support if something goes wrong. For example, if an item does not match its description or is lost in transit, Tradera will assist you.

Tradera also offers the service Tradera Authenticated, where luxury items are reviewed by a security team and verified as authentic before sale.
