= Nameisis =

- Duke of Semigallia
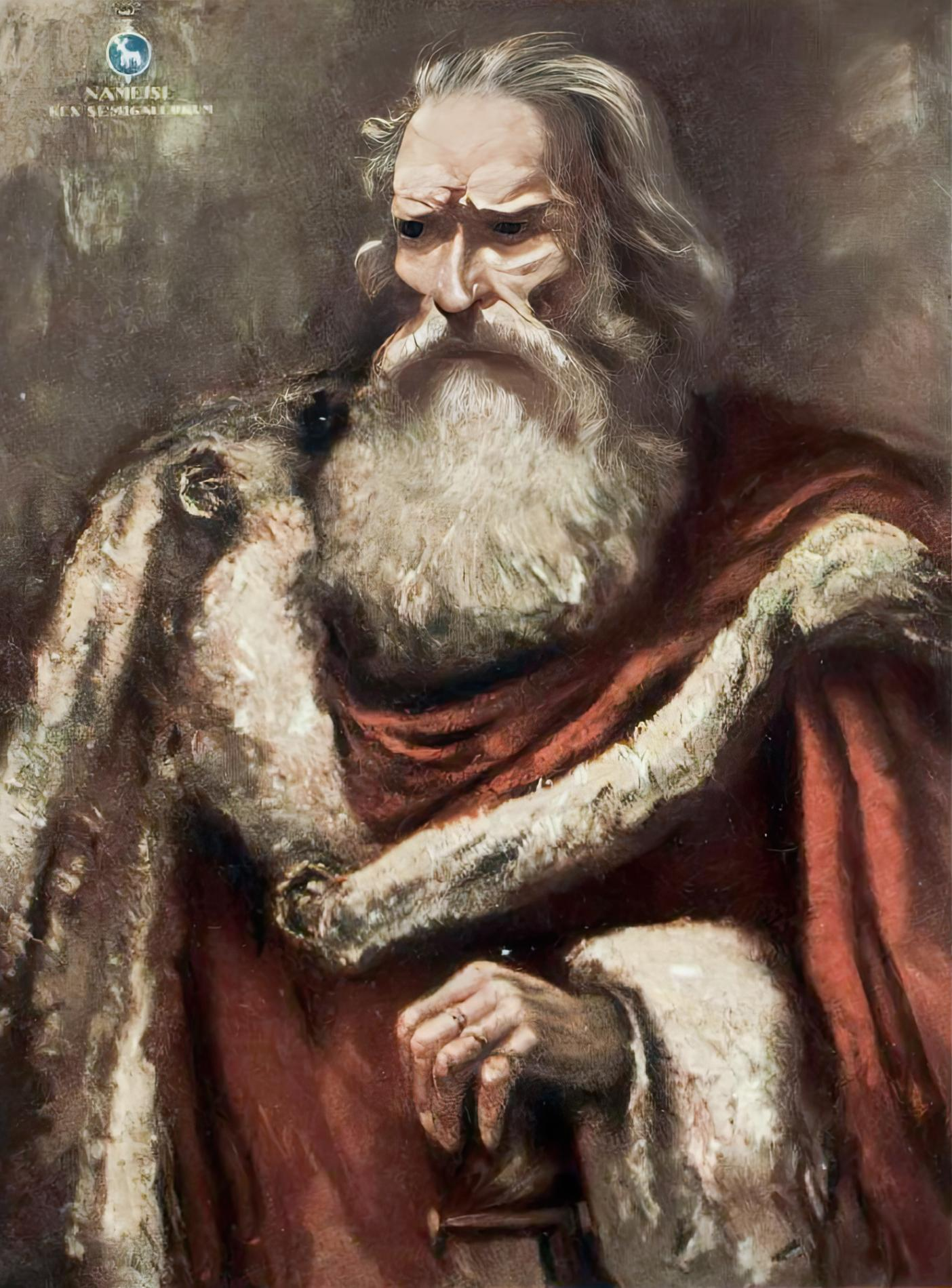
- Painting of Nameisis by Ludofs Liberts in the Riga Castle, 1936.
- Reign: 1270s – 1281
- Born: 13th century
- Died: After 1281

Nameisis or Namejs (also Nameise, Nameyxe) was a Semigallian duke in the second half of the 13th century. He ruled in the western part of Semigallia, with his capital at Tērvete (present-day Latvia). In 1279–81, he led a Semigallian uprising against the Livonian Order, a crusading military order. Very little is known about his life. He is mentioned only in the Livonian Rhymed Chronicle and in some documents from the 14th century. For this reason he is sometimes referred as semi legendary ruler in Latvian historiography.

Nameisis was mentioned for the first time in 1272 when he was one of Semigallian nobles who signed a peace treaty with the Livonian Order and the Archbishop of Riga.

In 1279, after the crusader defeat in the Battle of Aizkraukle, Nameisis led a Semigallian revolt against the crusaders. Nameisis made an alliance with Traidenis, Grand Duke of Lithuania, recognizing him as his suzerain, and managed to defeat the Livonian garrison in the Tērvete castle. In short time, Semigallians captured other castles and the crusaders were forced to leave Semigallia, except the Mežotne hillfort.

In summer 1279, the crusaders made several attempts to conquer back their lost positions. They pillaged lands around Dobele and Tērvete but were unable to conquer the castles. In autumn 1280, Nameisis attacked Riga, the main crusader stronghold. The attack failed because the crusaders managed to summon a great force of their Latgalian allies and set up defensive positions in front of the city. However, the Semigallians managed to capture several prisoners, including order's marshal who was sent to duke Traidenis and eventually killed in Kernave.

In 1281, the Livonian army again attacked the Dobele Castle but, with the help of the Lithuanians, were defeated. In the autumn, a united crusader army (about 14,000 men) attacked Tērvete with war machines. The Semigallians were unable to resist such a force and Nameisis signed a new peace treaty with the Livonian Order. According to the treaty, the Semigallians were forced to pay a tribute and accept German judges but kept their castles and lands.

After the treaty, Nameisis with the majority of Semigalians en-masse emigrated to Lithuania and was fighting crusaders in Christburg, East Prussia together with duke Traidenis. Since there is no mention of Nameisis after that, it is presumed that he was killed there. Gediminas 4 decades later in the 1320s titled himself "the king of Semigalians" and was inviting pastors, who know Semigallian language to Vilnius in his letters.

== See also ==
- Namejs Ring

== Sources ==
- Atskaņu chronika. Ditleba Alnpeķes “Rīmju chronika” / Atdzejojis Jēkabs Saiva. R. Klaustiņa ievads un piezīmes. - R., 1936
- Das Zeugenverhör des Franciscus de Moliano (1312) / Bearbeitet von A.Seraphim. - Königsberg i. Pr., 1912.
- Dunsdorfs E. Latvijas vēsture. - Lincoln (Nebraska), 1980
