= Jammes Luckett =

Musician, composer, songwriter, writer, Visual Artist

- Also known as: Jaye Barnes Luckett, Poperratic, Alien Tempo Experiment 13, Merkcurie
- Born: Columbus, OH, United States
- Genres: Rock, pop, electronic, classical, dance, alternative, soul, jazz
- Occupations: Musician, composer, songwriter, music producer, writer, visual artist, actor, voice over artist, music video director
- Instruments: Vocals, guitar, bass guitar, keyboards, violin, saxophone, drums, percussion
- Years active: 1994–present
- Labels: Art Mechanix, Go Little Records, Glimmerfed Records, La-La Land Records
- Website: www.artmechanix.com

Jammes Luckett, also formerly credited as Jaye Barnes Luckett is an American musician, writer, visual artist, and voice actor. She is a member of the rock / electronic band Poperratic – as singer, songwriter, multi-instrumentalist, music arranger, music video director and record producer. Luckett is also a film and television composer and songwriter, composing film scores and original songs.

== Art Mechanix ==
Luckett has released recordings, artwork, zines, stories and other projects via her imprint, Art Mechanix. Art Mechanix was formerly known as Go Little Records, and was initially founded in 1998.

== Music ==
In addition to her own name, Luckett has also worked under various pseudonyms: Alien Tempo Experiment 13 (or ATE 13), Merkcurie and Poperratic.

=== Poperratic (1994–Present) ===
Jammes' one-woman music group, Poperratic, first began as Alien Tempo Experiment 13, also known as ATE 13. With Go Little Records, she self-released a number of cassette albums. In 1998, she saw her first 7" Vinyl E.P., "Live! From The Roller Derby" commercially released on the now-defunct New York-based indie label Glimmerfed Records. The E.P. was co-produced by Luckett, with A.J. Lambert, then-future film director Lucky McKee, and also Don Fleming (musician) the noted music producer who has worked with (Hole, Sonic Youth, Shonen Knife).

Poperratic's music is mostly noted for its catchy melodies, elaborate harmony arrangements, crunchy guitars and unusual structures, all written and performed by Luckett, herself. Due to the unconventional structures Luckett often uses, as well as storytelling techniques, Luckett's music tends to have a cinematic quality to it. When asked who his favorite film directors of previous generations who piqued his interest in horror were, Lucky McKee alluded to the fact that he considers Luckett a peer in this regard, by listing Poperratic as a favorite. Comic book illustrator Jordan Crane, of NON-existence Comics once described one of Luckett's early rock releases as "hitting around PJ Harvey meets the Pixies... with some Beatles."

In early 2007, Poperratic's first studio album, 'Vagus (the wandering nerve.)' was released. A review at Perrero said of the 'Vagus', "The album overall has a really bluesy old school rock feel, by way of the grrl band movement of the early 90s."

=== Jammes Luckett ===
In 2009, Luckett returned to primarily using Jammes Luckett as the credited name for projects, regardless of genre or medium.

=== Merkcurie ===
Jammes Luckett has also written and performed electronic music under the project name "Merkcurie". Merkcurie sometimes features a character called "Merk Shaneley" (voiced by Luckett).

== Writing ==
Jammes' portfolio has shown a long history as a writer of screenplays, stage plays, and short stories, including some ghostwritten for others. In 2012, her newsletter stated that she was working on a science fiction novel, entitled "The Perfect Kind" and various other writing projects. Luckett has written across a variety of genres including science fiction, contemporary fantasy, paranormal, children's literature, and technical writing.

== Acting and Directing ==
Starting from a young age, Luckett began acting in the theatre, in dramatic and musical productions. At times, she served as assistant director and sometimes director of small stage productions. Among other subjects, Jammes studied animation and filmmaking in college, including at the University of Southern California, where she met frequent collaborator Lucky McKee. McKee has cited Jammes Luckett and Poperratic when asked about the directors who has been most influential on him.

Luckett carried her experience across multiple mediums into her film and voice acting work, often on the same film and television projects she composed and performed original music for. Some of her most extensive contributions were frequently uncredited.

In 2007, she served as voice talent on an animated pilot called "The Twincesses". Luckett has also scored and acted in a number of films for writer/director Kevin Ford of Mo-Freek Filmworks.

Luckett has also has directed music videos. The music video for her original song "Android in Love" was selected to feature on the website for the 2012 Protoclip Festival International Du Clip Musical (Music Video Festival), in Paris, France. She directed, edited and animated the video, as well as wrote, produced and performed the track.

== Art and Design ==
As a professional designer and visual artist, Luckett has done album artwork, paintings, interior and furniture design, animation, posters and other art for production companies and studios.

In 2008, McKee recruited Luckett to create the poster art for his film Blue Like You (2008), which was created for Xbox 360 Live's "Horror Meets Comedy" episodes which debuted on New Xbox Experience. Luckett's poster for the film was printed and distributed at that year's San Diego ComiCon, during an appearance by Lucky McKee and cast. It was also featured as the broadcast art for the episode, which viewers watched via the Xbox 360 console.

Luckett also directed music videos for several of her own songs for YouTube. In addition to directing them, other roles served on the project include as an editor, animator and actor.

== Collaborative works ==
=== Film and Television Soundtracks ===
Luckett's scores earned a reputation for their "haunting melodies and textured atmosphere". Both Ain't It Cool News and The Los Angeles Times cited Luckett as a "composer to watch". . Most of her early scoring work for Lucky McKee was written, performed and recorded herself; with modest equipment, lending itself to the unconventional nature of her writing.

In honor of her unusual approach to horror music, Luckett was asked to appear at the first "Maestros of Horror" Composer Panel at the 2007 Weekend of Horrors. She appeared beside fellow composers Harry Manfredini, John Harrison, John Murphy, Nathan Barr, and Richard Band, on the same day that soundtrack label La-La Land Records released an early retrospective of her film scoring work, entitled "May and Other Selected Works of Jaye Barnes Luckett" (LLLCD 1056). She also appeared on a Weekend of Horrors panel in 2002, with Lucky McKee, Angela Bettis, Anna Faris, and Nichole Hiltz, while promoting May.

Luckett's collaborations with screenwriter/film director McKee, stemmed from their years as students at the University of Southern California, in Los Angeles. Both also have stated that it was Luckett who originated the role of "May", in a series of short films from the USC-era. Having played in several bands together, McKee asked her years later to write the score for their first feature, May, which was an expansion of his student films.

In many of Luckett and McKee's collaborative works, Angela Bettis appeared as an actor. However, for 2007's Roman, which also featured original score and songs by Luckett (as Poperratic), McKee starred in the title role, with Bettis directing.

Luckett scored and/or provided original songs for the following McKee-related films:

- 'May' (2002) – her first orchestral score for a feature film. She also provided numerous original songs under the name Alien Tempo Experiment 13, and served as Music Supervisor.
- The Woods (2006) – original songs and additional score
- Masters of Horror: Sick Girl (2006) – her first television score. Also featured original Poperratic songs. This was the tenth episode of the first season of the popular Showtime TV series Masters of Horror
- Roman (2007) – her personal favorite of her own scores. Also features original Poperratic songs, and Luckett was co-music supervisor, along with director Angela Bettis.
- Blue Like You (2009) – co-wrote and performed the title theme song, for the Xbox 360 Live episode, directed by McKee.

=== DEUXO ===
Luckett briefly was one-half of the Electronic Pop / Dance collaboration called DEUXO with fellow musician / producer Schpilkas. The project released a digital E.P. that year called "Tres Deuxo," which shows another side of Luckett's versatility as a synth player, vocalist and co-songwriter. In early 2007, DEUXO's song "MoreSumthin (Fais Do Do)" was featured in the third episode of the FX (TV Network) show Dirt, starring Courteney Cox.

== Selected awards and nominations ==
- Sitges Film Festival
  Nominated for Best Soundtrack: 'May' (2002)
