= Poperratic =

- Origin: Los Angeles, California, U.S.
- Genres: Alternative rock, pop, indie rock, electronic, soundtracks, film music
- Years active: 1993–Present
- Labels: Art Mechanix; Go Little Records; Glimmerfed Records; La-La Land Records
- Past members: Jammes Luckett
- Website: www.artmechanix.com

Poperratic is a solo music project/band from Los Angeles, California. Its sole member is the songwriter, composer, and multi-instrumentalist Jammes Luckett. Its music traverses a number of alternative music genres, but is mostly distinguished by Luckett's heavy rhythm guitar work, layers of harmonies, catchy melodies, and storytelling lyrics.

Jammes Luckett came to some international attention via her film and television soundtrack work with writer/film director Lucky McKee. It feature films, such as the cult favorite "May", The Woods, Masters of Horror: "Sick Girl", and Roman (the latter written by and starring McKee, and directed by fellow frequent collaborator Angela Bettis).

== History ==
Poperratic was founded in 1993, initially under the name Alien Tempo Experiment 13, and was renamed in 2004. Early years saw Luckett releasing lo-fi homemade albums on her label imprint Go Little Records, and in 1998, she released a 7" vinyl E.P. with Glimmerfed Records. The E.P. was co-produced by Luckett, with A.J. Lambert, then-future film director Lucky McKee, and also Don Fleming (musician) [noted music producer who has worked with (Hole (band), Sonic Youth, and Shonen Knife)].

In 2006, Poperratic performed at the International Pop Overthrow Music Festival in Los Angeles.

In early 2007, Poperratic's first studio album, 'Vagus (the wandering nerve.)' was released. A review at Perrero said of the 'Vagus', "The album overall has a really bluesy old school rock feel, by way of the grrl band movement of the early 1990s."

In addition to Poperratic, Luckett also wrote and performed as one-half of the electronic pop project DEUXO, with composer/musician/producer Schpilkas.

== Soundtrack work ==
Luckett's first feature film soundtrack work was for "May (film)," requested by longtime collaborator Lucky McKee. Luckett eventually wrote and performed various soundtracks for McKee; credited under various names including "Jaye Barnes Luckett" and "Alien Tempo Experiment 13". Luckett's scores earned a reputation for their "haunting melodies and textured atmosphere". Both Ain't It Cool News and The Los Angeles Times cited Jammes Luckett as a "composer to watch". . Most of her early scoring work for Lucky McKee was written, performed and recorded herself, with modest equipment, lending itself to the unconventional nature of her writing.

In 2007, Luckett's soundtrack work was recognized with a limited edition CD release containing an early career retrospective of Jammes Luckett and Poperratic's soundtrack work, "May and Other Selected Works of Jaye Barnes Luckett" was released by La-La Land Records, and also a place on the first-ever Composer Panel at the Fangoria Weekend of Horrors.

Though mostly known for her horror soundtracks, Luckett primarily worked in other genres. She also frequently worked with other directors such as Angela Bettis and writer/director Kevin Ford of Mo-Freek Filmworks.

== Personnel ==
=== Members ===
- Jammes Luckett – vocals, guitar, bass, keyboards, drums

== Selected discography ==
- ATE 13: Live! From The Roller Derby 7" vinyl/EP (1998)
- Quel Horror! The Impossibly Misleading Film Music of JBL and ATE 13 CD/LP (2006)
- Vagus the Wandering Nerve) CD/LP (2006)
- MAY and Other Selected Works of Jaye Barnes Luckett CD/LP (2007)
