= Strasbourg European Fantastic Film Festival =

Annual film festival in France

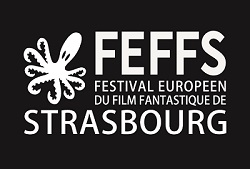

- Logo and official poster of the 18th edition
- Location: Strasbourg, France
- Founded: 2007
- Awards: Golden Octopus
- Hosted by: Les Films du Spectre
- Artistic director: Daniel Cohen
- No. of films: 130
- Festival date: Opening: September 26, 2025; Closing: October 5, 2025
- Language: International
- Website: strasbourgfestival.com

Current: 18th
- 19th 17th

The Strasbourg European Fantastic Film Festival (SEFFF) (French: Festival Européen du Film Fantastique de Strasbourg), is an annual film festival held in Strasbourg, France, focused on fantasy, science fiction and horror films. The festival takes place annually in September since 2008, it derives from the Spectre Film Festival that was created in 2005 by the organization Les Films du Spectre.

Notable past guests of the festival include Tobe Hooper, Lamberto Bava, Catherine Breillat, Marina De Van, Ruggero Deodato, Lucky McKee, Agnès Merlet, Caroline Munro, Philippe Nahon, Brian Yuzna, Roger Corman, Mick Garris and George A. Romero.

Moreover, since 2009 the festival starts with the Great Strasbourg Zombie Walk, it has become one of the largest in Europe with around 4000 participants in 2014.

== History ==
=== Hammer Film Festival ===
In 2006, the organization Les Films du Spectre decided to organize the Hammer Film Festival which revolved around the work of the British film production company Hammer Film Productions. For this occasion the cinemas STAR in Strasbourg screened some of Hammer original 35mm prints such as The Curse of Frankenstein, Brides of Dracula, The Gorgon, The Reptile, Dracula, Quatermass and the Pit and The Mummy. Furthermore, Hammer screenwriter Jimmy Sangster was invited to present some of the movies.

=== Spectre Film Festival ===
With the Hammer Film Festival being a success the organization decided to renew the experience in 2007 with the Spectre Film Festival. This time around the festival focused on science fiction films from the 1950s to the 1980s with the screening of space operas, Japanese science fiction films, Jack Arnold's movies and Social science fiction features. Moreover, some of the screenings were available in 3D such as the Creature from the Black Lagoon.

The festival program included features like Forbidden planet, Plan 9 from Outer Space, Starcrash, Planet of the Apes, Invasion of Astro-Monster and The War in Space. More guests were invited during this edition with the presence of François Schuiten, Benoît Peeters, Luigi Cozzi, Jean Pierre Berthome and Jean Alessandrini.

=== Creation of the Strasbourg European Fantastic Film Festival ===
In 2008 the festival joined the European Fantastic Film Festivals Federation (EFFFF) as an adherent member and changed its name to Strasbourg European Fantastic Film Festival. In addition to its usual screenings the festival added two competitions, respectively between European short films and European feature films. The SEFFF invited Lamberto Bava, Caroline Munro, Philippe Nahon and Jean-François Rauger to become the festival's first jury. Finally during this edition the festival paid tribute to the work of Ray Harryhausen through multiple screenings.

In 2009 the festival kept a similar format to the previous year. During this edition the jury was composed of Ruggero Deodato, Jean-Jacques Bernard, Marina de Van and its president Roger Corman. Moreover, for this second edition the SEFFF organized a retrospective of George Frangu work and celebrated the 20th anniversary of Ridley Scott's Alien.

=== Affiliation with the European Fantastic Film Festivals Federation ===
==== Third Edition ====
In 2010 the SEFFF moved up to affiliated membership in the European Fantastic Film Festivals Federation enabling them to hold a Méliès d’Argent competition. This award nominate a feature film and a short film to the Méliès d'or competition that is held during Sitges Film Festival. This year jury was made of Brian Yuzna, Manlio Gomarasca, Axelle Carolyn and Alexandre O. Philippe. The theme of this third edition revolved around Val Lewton work, the Italian pop cinema of the 1960s and the 30th anniversary of Star Wars Episode 2. The movie Buried which won Strasbourg's first Méliès d’Argent went on winning this year Méliès d'or.

==== Fourth Edition ====
The fourth edition of the festival was marked by the presence of George A. Romero as the president of this year's jury. Romero's work as well as Tod Browning's and Edgar Wallace's were celebrated during the festival with the screenings of their major features. Furthermore Ben Templesmith and Jean-Baptiste Thoret joined Romero to form the jury and directors such as Lucky McKee, Keith Wright and Matti Bye were invited as special guests.

==== Fifth Edition ====
In 2012 the festival kept on growing with an even greater number of days, screenings and guests. This year theme was Post-apocalypse world as well as Michael Powell's and Emeric Pressburger's work. The jury was composed of Mick Garris, Pierre Bordage, Alan Jones and Agnès Merlet (the 2011 Méliès d’Argent winner).

Moreover, many film crews were invited such as Colin Trevorrow, Johannes Roberts, Juan Carlos Medina, Zack Parker, Alexandre O. Philippe, Boris Rodriguez, Robin Entreinger, Justin Benson, Aaron S. Moorhead, Juan Martinez Moreno and Ryan Andrews.

==== Sixth Edition ====
In 2013, the festival's size increased once again, with the addition of more special screenings, more crossovers movies, a new documentaries section, etc. Furthermore, during this 6th edition, the festival managed to get one international premiere, three European premieres (Proxy of Zach Parker, All Cheerleaders Die of Lucky McKee and Machete Kills of Robert Rodriguez) and numerous French premieres. This year's retrospective revolved around King Kong and El Santo. The feature films' jury was composed of Lucky McKee (2011 Golden Octopus winner) as president, Travis Stevens, Carlos Areces, Julien Gester and Tomas Lemarquis.

Other notable guests included Xan Cassavetes, Marina de Van, Sianoa Smit-McPhee, Anna Mouglalis, Zach Parker and Bobby Boermans.

A new independent video game contest, called Indium Game Contest, was also held during the 2013 SEFFF.

==== Seventh Edition ====
For the seventh edition Tobe Hooper presided over the SEFFF jury on the occasion of the 40th anniversary of The Texas Chainsaw Massacre. Other members of the feature film jury were Juan Martinez Moreno and Xavier Palud. As usual a part of the festival was devoted to past movies with a first retrospective on the theme of "Sympathy for the Devil" and second one focusing on Tobe Hooper's work.

This edition's notable guests were Ana Lily Amirpour, Leigh Janiak, Till Kleinert, Pau Esteve Birba, Xavier Palud, Fabrice du Welz, Steve Oram and Helena Noguerra.

Other events included an outdoor screening of Ghostbusters which was held in front of 2000 people at the foot of the Strasbourg Cathedral for the 30th anniversary of the movie, a silent film concert of Faust, a master class held by Tobe Hooper, etc.

The Indium Game Contest came back for a second edition during this seventh edition of SEFFF with a selection of 18 independent video games.

== Awards ==
=== 2008 ===
Feature films

- Golden Octopus for the best European fantastic film: Vinyan of Fabrice Du Welz (France)
- Jury Special Mention: Shiver of Isidro Ortiz (Espagne)
- Audience Award for the best European fantastic film: The Substitute of Ole Bornedal (Denmark)

Short films

- Golden Octopus for the best European short fantastic film: Scary of Martijn Hullegie (Netherlands)
- Jury Special Mention: L'insomniaque de Mathieu Mazzoni (France)
- Audience Award for the best European fantastic short film: Scary of Martijn Hullegie (Netherlands)
- Student Jury Prize for the best European short fantastic film: Cold And Dry of Kristoffer Joner (Norway)

=== 2009 ===
Feature films

- Golden Octopus for the best European fantastic film: Moon of Duncan Jones (UK)
- Jury Special Mention: The Children of Tom Shankland (UK)
- Audience Award for the best European fantastic film: Dead Snow of Tommy Wirkola (Norway)

Short films

- The Méliès d’Argent for the best European short fantastic film: Full Employment of Thomas Oberlies and Matthias Vogel (Germany)
- Audience Award for the best European fantastic short film: Full Employment of Thomas Oberlies and Matthias Vogel (Germany)
- Student Jury Prize for the best European short fantastic film: The Knot of Kjersti Steinsbø (Norway)

=== 2010 ===
Feature films

- The Méliès d’Argent for the best European fantastic film: Buried of Rodrigo Cortes (Spain)
- Jury Special Mention: Zwart Water of Elbert van Strien (Netherlands)
- Audience Award for the best European fantastic film: Buried of Rodrigo Cortes (Spain)

Short films

- The Méliès d’Argent for the best European short fantastic film: Mr Foley of D.A.D.D.Y (Ireland)
- Audience Award for the best European fantastic short film: Mr Foley of D.A.D.D.Y (Ireland)
- Student Jury Prize for the best European short fantastic film: Fard of David Alapont and Luis Briceno (France)

=== 2011 ===
Feature films

- Golden Octopus for the best international fantastic film: The Woman of Lucky McKee (USA)
- The Méliès d’Argent for the best European fantastic film: Hideaways of Agnès Merlet (Ireland)
- Jury Special Mention: Vampire of Shunji Iwai (USA, Japan)
- Audience Award for the best European fantastic film: The Woman of Lucky McKee (Spain)

Short films

- Golden Octopus for the best international short fantastic film: Bear of Nash Edgerton (Australia)
- The Méliès d’Argent for the best European short fantastic film: La Femme à Cordes of Vladimir Mavounia-Kouka (France, Belgium)
- Audience Award for the best European fantastic short film: Legend of the Beaver Dam of Jérome Sable (Canada)
- Student Jury Prize for the best European short fantastic film: Legend of the Beaver Dam de Jérome Sable (Canada)

Short films made in France

- Seppia price: L'Attaque du Monstre Géant Suceur de Cerveaux de l'Espace of Guillaume Rieu (France)

=== 2012 ===
Feature films

- The Golden Octopus for the best international fantastic film: Sound of My Voice of Zal Batmanglij
- The Méliès d’Argent for the best European fantastic film: Painless of Juan Carlos Medina
- The Jury Special Mention: Excision of Richard Bates Jr.
- The Audience Award for the best international fantastic film: Grabbers of Jon Wright

Short films

- The Golden Octopus for the best international short fantastic film: The Last Bus of Ivana Laucikova and Martin Snopek
- The Méliès d’Argent for the best European short fantastic film: The Bird Spider (La Migala) of Jaime Dezcallar
- The Student Jury Prize for the best international short fantastic film: The Last Bus of Ivana Laucikova and Martin Snopek
- The Audience Award for the best international short fantastic film: The Bird Spider (La Migala) of Jaime Dezcallar
- The Special Mention for the best international short fantastic film: A Curious Conjunction Of Coincidences of Jost Reijmers

Short films made in France

- The Jury Prize for the best French fantastic short film: Le Vivier of Sylvia Guillet
- The Special Mention for the French fantastic short film: The Island Keeper of Aude Cabannes, Julien Malot and Charlotte Pipet

=== 2013 ===
Feature films

- The Golden Octopus for the best international fantastic film: Kiss of the Damned of Xan Cassavetes
- The Méliès d’Argent for the best European fantastic film: Borgman of Alex van Warmerdam
- The Jury Special Mention: Dark Touch of Marina de Van
- The Audience Award for the best international fantastic film: Uma História de Amor e Fúria of Luiz Bolognesi

Short films

- The Golden Octopus for the best international short fantastic film: Yardbird of Michael Spiccia
- The Méliès d’Argent for the best European short fantastic film: No tiene gracia (Not Funny) of Carlos Violadé
- The Student Jury Prize for the best international short fantastic film: No tiene gracia (Not Funny) of Carlos Violadé
- The Audience Award for the best international short fantastic film: Yardbird of Michael Spiccia
- The Special Mention for the best international short fantastic film: The Hunt of Spencer Estabrooks

Short films made in France

- The Jury Prize for the best French fantastic short film: The Things they Left Behind of Guillaume Heulard and Stépahen Valette
- The Jury Prize for the best animated short film: Prgy-Skok of Leonid Shmelkov

Indium Game Contest

- The Octopix for the best completed game: Elemental4l of i-illusions
- The Octopix for the best work in progress: Pathogen of Zach Bonn

=== 2014 ===
Feature films

- The Golden Octopus for the best international fantastic film: White God of Kornél Mundruczó
- The Méliès d’Argent for the best European fantastic film: Cannibal of Manuel Martín Cuenca
- The Jury Special Mention: Alleluia of Fabrice du Welz
- The Audience Award for the best international fantastic film: Housebound of Gerard Johnstone

Short films

- The Golden Octopus for the best international short fantastic film: The Landing of Josh Tanner
- The Méliès d’Argent for the best European short fantastic film: Robotics of Jasper Bazuin
- The Student Jury Prize for the best international short fantastic film: Ceremony for a Friend of Kaveh Ebrahimpour
- The Audience Award for the best international short fantastic film: Robotics of Jasper Bazuin
- The Special Mention for the best international short fantastic film: Ceremony for a Friend of Kaveh Ebrahimpour
- The Jury Prize for the best animated short film: Imposteur of Elie Chapuis
- The Special Mention for the best animated short film: La Bête of Vladimir Mavounia-Kouka

Short films made in France

- The Jury Prize for the best French fantastic short film: Shadow of Lorenzo Recio

Indium Game Contest

- The Octopix for the best game: The Coral Cave
- The Jury Special Mention: Savage - The Shard of Gozen

=== 2015 ===
Feature films

- The Golden Octopus for the best international fantastic film: The Invitation of Karyn Kusama
- The Méliès d’Argent for the best European fantastic film: The Hallow of Corin Hardy
- The Jury Special Mention: The Survivalist of Stephen Fingleton
- The Audience Award for the best international fantastic film: The Lobster of Yorgos Lanthimos

Short films

- The Golden Octopus for the best international short fantastic film: Barrow of Wade K. Savage
- The Méliès d’Argent for the best European short fantastic film: Detector of Floris Kingma
- The Student Jury Prize for the best international short fantastic film: Detector of Floris Kingma
- The Audience Award for the best international short fantastic film: Detector of Floris Kingma
- The Special Mention for the best international short fantastic film: Clones of Rafael Bolliger
- The Jury Prize for the best animated short film: World of Tomorrow of Don Hertzfeldt
- The Special Mention for the best animated short film: Le Repas Dominical of Céline Deveaux

Short films made in France

- The Jury Prize for the best French fantastic short film: Aquabike of Jean-Baptiste Saurel
- The Special Mention for the best French fantastic short film: Garçonne of Nicolas Sarkissian

Indium Game Contest

- The Octopix for the best game: Apocalypse Cow of Monsters are here
- The Jury Prize for the best game: Zombie Night Terror of NoClip

=== 2016 ===
Feature films

- The Golden Octopus for the best international fantastic film: Raw of Julia Ducournau
- The Méliès d’Argent for the best European fantastic film: I Am Not a Serial Killer of Billy O'Brien
- The Audience Award for the best international fantastic film: Raw of Julia Ducournau
- The Jury Prize for the best crossover film: Psycho Raman of Anurag Kashyap

Short films

- The Golden Octopus for the best international short fantastic film: The Disappearance of Willie Bingham of Matt Richards
- The Méliès d’Argent for the best European short fantastic film: The Tunnel (Tunnelen) of André Øvredal
- The Special Mention for the best short film: Subotika, Land of Wonders of Peter Volkart
- The Audience Award for the best international short fantastic film: Madam Black of Ivan Barge
- The Student Jury Prize for the best international short fantastic film: The Disappearance of Willie Bingham of Matt Richards
- The Jury Prize for the best animated short film: Teeth of Daniel Gray and Tom Brown

Short films made in France

- The Jury Prize for the best French fantastic short film: Quenottes of Pascal Thiebaux and Gil Pinheiro

Indium Game Contest

- The Octopix for the best game: Mars Underground of Matthew Sanderson
- The Jury Prize for the best game: Machiavillain of Wild Factor

=== 2017 ===
Feature films

- The Golden Octopus for the best international fantastic film: Double Date of Benjamin Barfoot
- The Méliès d’Argent for the best European fantastic film: Let the Corpses Tan of Hélène Cattet and Bruno Forzani
- The Audience Award for the best international fantastic film: Dave Made a Maze of Bill Watterson
- The Jury Special Mention: Earth and Light (Terra e Luz) of Renné França
- The Jury Prize for the best crossover film: Bitch of Marianna Palka

Short films

- The Golden Octopus for the best international short fantastic film: Fucking Bunnies (Saatanan Kanit) of Teemu Niukkanen
- The Méliès d’Argent for the best European short fantastic film: The Absence of Eddy Table of Rune Spaans
- The Student Jury Prize for the best international short fantastic film: Expire of Magali Magistry
- The Audience Award for the best international short fantastic film: The Robbery of Jim Cummings
- The Jury Special Mention for the best short film: Mouse of Celine Held and Logan George
- The Jury Prize for the best animated short film: The Absence of Eddy Table of Rune Spaans
- The Jury Special Mention for the best animated short film: Pussy (Cipka) of Renata Gąsiorowska

Short films made in France

- The Jury Prize for the best French fantastic short film: Animal of Jules Janaud and Fabrice Le Nézet

Indium Game Contest

- The Octopix for the best game: Do Not Feed the Monkeys of Fictiorama Studios
- The Jury Prize for the best student game: Abadi of Beetle Games (ETPA Toulouse)
- The Arte Creative prize: oQo of Lance and 3-50

=== 2018 ===
Feature films

- The Golden Octopus for the best international fantastic film: Exit (Cutterhead) of Rasmus Kloster Bro
- The Méliès d’Argent for the best European fantastic film: The House that Jack Built of Lars von Trier
- The Audience Award for the best international fantastic film: Exit (Cutterhead) of Rasmus Kloster Bro
- The Jury Special Mention: Prospect of Chris Caldwell and Zeek Earl
- The Jury Prize for the best animated film (ex aequo): Mirai (Mirai no Mirai) of Mamoru Hosoda
- The Jury Prize for the best crossover film: Xiao Mei of Maren Hwang
- The Special Mention for the best crossover film: Pig (Khook) of Mani Haghighi

Short films

- The Golden Octopus for the best international short fantastic film: Babs of Celine Held and Logan George
- The Méliès d’Argent for the best European short fantastic film: À l'aube of Julien Trauman
- The Student Jury Prize for the best international short fantastic film: Deer Boy of Katarzyna Gondek
- The Audience Award for the best international short fantastic film: The Girl in the Snow (Das Mädchen im schnee) of Dennis Ledergerber
- The Jury Prize for the best animated short film: Lola, une patate vivante of Leonid Shmelkov
- The Jury Special Mention for the best animated short film: Mr. Deer of Mojtaba Mousavi

Short films made in France

- The Jury Prize for the best French fantastic short film: Chose mentale of William Laboury

Indium Game Contest

- The Octopix for the best game: Nine Witches : Family Disruption of One Man Game
- The Audience Award for the best game: The Textorcist of Morbidware

=== 2019 ===
Feature films

- The Golden Octopus for the best international fantastic film: In Fabric of Peter Strickland
- The Méliès d’Argent for the best European fantastic film: In Fabric of Peter Strickland
- The Audience Award for the best international fantastic film: The Room of Christian Volckman
- The Jury Special Mention: Little Joe of Jessica Hausner
- The Cigogne d'Or for the best animated film (ex aequo): I Lost My Body of Jérémy Clapin and Away of Gints Zilbalodis
- The Jury Special Mention for the best animated film: Marona's Fantastic Tale of Anca Damian
- The Jury Prize for the best crossover film: Dogs Don't Wear Pants (Koirat eivät käytä housuja) of Jukka-Pekka Valkeapää

Short films

- The Golden Octopus for the best international short fantastic film: Fauve of Jérémy Comte
- The Méliès d’Argent for the best European short fantastic film: Yandere of William Laboury
- The Student Jury Prize for the best international short fantastic film: The Burden (Het Juk) of Nico Dan Ben Brink
- The Student Jury Prize for the best animated short film: Pulsion of Pedro Casavecchia
- The Audience Award for the best international short fantastic film: The Burden (Het Juk) of Nico Dan Ben Brink
- The Jury Prize for the best animated short film: L'heure de l'ours of Agnès Patron

Short films made in France

- The Jury Prize for the best French fantastic short film: Animal of Jules Janaud and Fabrice Le Nézet

Indium Game Contest

- The Octopix for the best game: Backbone of EggNut
- The Audience Award for the best game: Scourgebringer of Flying Oak Games

=== 2021 ===
Feature films

- The Golden Octopus for the best international fantastic film: The Innocents by Eskil Vogt
- The Audience Award for the best international fantastic film: The Innocents by Eskil Vogt
- The Jury Special Mention: Lamb by Valdimar Jóhannsson
- The Méliès d’Argent for the best European fantastic film: Name Above the Title by Carlos Conceição
- The Cigogne d'Or for the best animated film: Junk Head by Takahide Hori
- The Jury Special Mention for the best animated film: Mad God by Phil Tippett
- The Jury Prize for the best crossover film: John and the Hole by Pascual Sisto

Short films

- The Golden Octopus for the best international short fantastic film: Such Small Hands by Maria Martinez Bayona
- The Méliès d’Argent for the best European short fantastic film: White Noises by Thomas Soulignac
- The Student Jury Prize for the best short fantastic film: T'es morte Hélène by Michiel Blanchart
- The Jury Prize for the best animated short film: Un Coeur D'Or by Simon Filliot

Short films made in France

- The Jury Prize for the best French animated short film: T'es morte Hélène by Michiel Blanchart

Indium Game Contest

- The Audience Award for the best game: Mind Scanners by The Outer Zone

=== 2025 ===
The 18th of the festival was held from 26 September to 5 October 2025. It opened with the 2025 French - Belgian science fiction film The Incredible Shrinking Man (L'Homme qui rétrécit) by Jan Kounen, and closed with the 2025 satirical absurdist science fiction black comedy film Bugonia by Yorgos Lanthimos.

Feature films

- The Golden Octopus for the best international fantastic film: Good Boy by Ben Leonberg
- The Audience Award for the best international fantastic film: The Holy Boy by Paolo Strippoli
- The Jury Special Mention: New Group by Yûta Shimotsu
- The Méliès d’Argent for the best European fantastic film: The Holy Boy by Paolo Strippoli
- The Cigogne d'Or for the best animated film: Arco by Ugo Bienvenu
- The Jury Special Mention for the best animated film: Heart of Darkness by Rogério Nunes
- Crossovers Grand Prix: Luger by Bruno Martín
- The Jury Special Mention for the best crossover film: Forbidden City by Gabriele Mainetti

Short films

- The Golden Octopus for the best international short fantastic film: Gynoid by Celia Galán
- The Méliès d’Argent for the best European short fantastic film: Nervous Ellie by David Yorke
- The Student Jury Prize for the best short fantastic film: Don Quichotte contre les Forces du Mal by Guillaume Rieu
- Best Animated Short Film: Double or Nothing by Tokay Sirin
- Short Film Audience Award: The Leader Will Come by Michiel Geluykens, Manuel Janssens

Short films made in France

- Best Short Film Made in France: Même la lune saignera by Stef Meyer, Rémy Barbe

== Opening and closing ceremonies ==
Since 2008 the festival schedule an opening and closing ceremony, which usually consist in a European movie premiere. Those movies were :

- 2008: Hellboy 2 of Guillermo del Toro and Death Race of Paul W. S. Anderson
- 2009: Esther of Jaume Collet-Serra and Trick 'r Treat of Michael Dougherty
- 2010: The Last Exorcism of Daniel Stamm and Kaboom of Gregg Araki
- 2011: Super of James Gunn and Tucker & Dale vs. Evil of Eli Craig
- 2012: Robot & Frank of Jake Schreier and Safety Not Guaranteed of Colin Trevorrow
- 2013: We Are What We Are of Jim Mickle and Machete Kills of Robert Rodriguez
- 2014: These Final Hours of Zak Hilditch and Predestination of the Spierig brothers

== Other activities around the festival ==
Since its beginning, the festival celebrate some of the most famous fantastic films directors and sagas such as Aliens, King Kong and Romero's "of the Dead Series", through exhibits, retrospectives, lectures and workshops.

In 2009 the first Great Strasbourg Zombie Walk was organized which marked the start of the festival. The walk brought together a few hundreds people for its first year but quickly grew bigger with more than 3500 people in 2012 and around 4000 people in 2014, making it one of the biggest zombie walk in Europe. Usually the walk is followed by the Bal des Zombies during which bands such as Daemonia and Mine Power Cosmic perform.

Since the 5th Edition of the festival a "Nuit des Nanars" (English: Night of the Z Movies) is organized. During this event 3 to 4 old Z movies are screened from midnight to the morning after. Some of the "Nanars" shown included: King Kong vs. Godzilla, Yeti: Giant of the 20th Century, The Mighty Peking Man, Rats: Night of Terror, Atomic Cyborg, etc. During the seventh edition of the festival, the "Nuit des Nanars" was exceptionally replaced by the "Cannon TestosteroneFest" during which three action movies of the late independent production company The Cannon Group were screened.

Moreover, a few exhibitors as well as a bar form the Village Fantastique where visitors can meet other fans as well as film crews, members of the jury and some of the festival organizers.

== See also ==
- List of fantastic and horror film festivals
- Melies International Festivals Federation
