= Charlie Shotwell =

American actor

- Born: July 17, 2007 (age 19); Madison, Wisconsin U.S.
- Occupation: Actor
- Years active: 2013–present

Charlie Shotwell (born July 17, 2007) is an American actor. He started acting professionally at the age of six. His first notable role was the young Nai Cash in the 2016 comedy-drama film Captain Fantastic for which he received nominations for SAG Awards and Young Artist Awards. He was lead of the Netflix horror film Eli and the coming-of-age psychological thriller John and the Hole, and appeared in the comedy film Troop Zero.

== Life and career ==
Shotwell was born on July 17, 2007 in Madison, Wisconsin. In 2015, Shotwell made his acting debut with the war-drama Man Down, playing the son of Shia LaBeouf and Kate Mara's character; Dito Montiel directed the film. He then starred as the youngest member of a survivalist left-wing philosophers' family in the Matt Ross directed comedy-drama Captain Fantastic. In 2017, Shotwell played the young Brian Walls in the Destin Daniel Cretton drama The Glass Castle. Later, he appeared in the Tali Shalom Ezer romance-drama My Days of Mercy. Soon after, Shotwell guest-starred in the episode "Lily's Law" of the TV-series Chicago Justice. Shotwell soon gained further recognition as a young John Paul Getty III in the 2017 Ridley Scott thriller All the Money in the World. Then in 2018, he performed as an English convict in the drama-thriller The Nightingale.

In 2019, Shotwell starred in the title role of the Netflix horror film Eli, directed by Ciarán Foy. Also that year, he played Joseph in the Amazon Studios comedy film Troop Zero, about 1970s girl scouts. In 2020 appears in family-thriller The Nest, playing Benjamin O'Hara, directed by Sean Durkin. Also in 2020, Shotwell appears on the horror podcast Borrasca by QCODE, and in the pilot episode Staged Dad on YouTube.

In 2021 he played John, in the coming-of-age psychological thriller John and the Hole, directed by Pascual Sisto and written by Nicolás Giacobone. Commenting on Charlie Shotwell's performance in Variety, Peter Debruge said that "child actor (...) goes deep in creepy family portrait [a] remarkable new talent Pascual Sisto's feature debut offers an unsettling look at a kid with something missing where his conscience should be." Also in 2021, he plays Hurley, in the horror film The Manson Brothers Midnight Zombie Massacre, by Max Martini.

In February 2022, a short film "Whiskey Pete" was released on YouTube, directed by Stefan Colson, in which Shotwell plays the kid. Also in 2022, Shotwell played the young Michael Morbius in the superhero film Morbius, and Jules Brennen in Chorus, short by Daniel J. Egbert.

== Personal life ==
Charlie Shotwell has three siblings, who are also actors: Jimmy and Henry Shotwell, and a step sister, Shree Crooks, who is Greg Crooks' daughter. They worked acting together in the pilot episode of Staged Dad and the short film Whiskey Pete.

== Filmography ==
=== Film ===
Key
†	Denotes works that have not yet been released

Year	Title	Role	Notes	Ref.
2015	Man Down	Johnathan Drummer		
2016	Captain Fantastic	Nai Cash		
2017	The Glass Castle	Young Brian Walls		
2017	My Days of Mercy	Benjamin		
2017	All the Money in the World	Young John Paul Getty III		
2018	The Nightingale	Eddie		
2019	Troop Zero	Joseph		
2019	Eli	Eli		
2020	The Nest	Benjamin O’Hara		
2021	John and the Hole	John Shay		
2021	The Manson Brothers Midnight Zombie Massacre	Hurley		
2022	Morbius	Young Michael Morbius		
2022	Chorus	Jules Brennen	Short	
2023	Bagged	Josh	Short	
2024	M.I.A.	Mr. Arnolds	Short	

=== Television ===
Year	Title	Role	Notes	Ref.
2014	The United Colors of Amani	Daniel	1 episode	
2015	The Comedians	Son	1 episode	
2016	Still Single	Viking Boy	Telefilm	
2016	Dr. Del	Stinger Roper	Telefilm	
2017	Chicago Justice	Sam Clark	1 episode	
2020	Staged Dad	Charlie	pilot episode (also credited as musician)	

=== Web ===
Year	Title	Role	Notes	Ref.
2020	The IMDb Studio at Sundance	Self	1 episode	
2020	Borrasca	Young Sam Walker	2 episodes, podcast	
2022	Whiskey Pete	The Kid	Short (also credited as musician)	

== Awards and nominations ==
Year	Award	Category	Work	Result
2017	Screen Actors Guild Awards (SAG Awards)	Outstanding Performance by a Cast in a Motion Picture	Captain Fantastic	Nominated
2017	Young Artist Awards	Best Performance in a Feature Film -Supporting Young Actor	Captain Fantastic	Nominated
