= All Cheerleaders Die (2001 film) =

2001 film by Lucky McKee, Chris Sivertson

- Directed by: Lucky McKee; Chris Sivertson
- Written by: Lucky McKee; Chris Sivertson
- Produced by: Lucky McKee; Chris Sivertson
- Starring: Julia Carpenter; Jesse Hlubik
- Music by: David DiIorio
- Release date: January 27, 2001
- Running time: 80 minutes
- Country: United States
- Language: English

All Cheerleaders Die is a 2001 American low-budget horror film written and directed by Lucky McKee and Chris Sivertson. The film was released on January 27, 2001, and was later remade into a 2013 major film studio budgeted film by the same name. It stars Chris Heinrich, who served as second unit director of photography in the remake.

Of the film, the directors stated that they chose to eventually remake it because they wanted a "fresh start", as they had shot the 2001 video immediately after graduating from college.

== Plot ==
A group of high school football players gets into an argument with their cheerleader girlfriends over the difficulty of their respective sports. The cheerleaders insist that forming a human pyramid is difficult, while the players insist that their boot camp is more strenuous. As a result, the players decide to set up a camping weekend with the idea of putting the girls through football training. This turns out to be a bad idea, as one of the cheerleaders ends up beating one of the footballers in a scrimmage game, who then ends up severely beating her. The girls try to escape, only to fall off a cliff and die. Panicked, the players assume that the girls are either dead or dying, and run off in the hopes that nobody will discover what has happened. Unbeknownst to them, one of the girls has survived and later returns at a high-school reunion to seek revenge. She summons the zombified remains of her dead friends, and one by one, picks off the football players.

== Cast ==
- Julia Carpenter as Hanna Popkin
- Drama as Tracey Beezley
- Dirty Ernie as Bartender
- Jennifer Grant as Martha Apple
- Chris Heinrich as George Shank
- Jesse Hlubik as Terry Stankus
- Bonnie McKee as Marquita Fector
- Mike McKee as Coach Wolf
- Quincy McKee as Sammy Fector
- Shelli Merrill a Maho
- Zach Passero as Vik Dario
- Matthew Shebesta as Manchester Manny Mankiewitz
- Marni Sparks as Simone Gavina
- Melinda Sparks as Tasha Kindle
- Eric Van Bebber as Ben Factor

== Reception ==
Joe Bob Briggs gave the film two stars and summed it up as "Return of the Living Dead meets Cheerleader Camp meets Stoner".
