= May (film) =

2002 film by Lucky McKee

- Theatrical release poster
- Directed by: Lucky McKee
- Written by: Lucky McKee
- Produced by: Marius Balchunas; Scott Sturgeon
- Starring: Angela Bettis; Jeremy Sisto; James Duval; Merle Kennedy; Kevin Gage; Anna Faris
- Cinematography: Steve Yedlin
- Edited by: Debra Goldfield; Rian Johnson; Chris Sivertson
- Music by: Jaye Barnes Luckett
- Production company: 2 Loop Films
- Distributed by: Lions Gate Films
- Release dates: January 13, 2002 (Sundance); February 7, 2003 (United States)
- Running time: 93 minutes
- Country: United States
- Language: English
- Budget: $1.7 million
- Box office: $634,803

May is a 2002 American psychological horror film written and directed by Lucky McKee in his directorial debut, and starring Angela Bettis, Jeremy Sisto, James Duval, Merle Kennedy, Kevin Gage, and Anna Faris. The film follows a lonely young woman (Bettis) traumatized by a difficult childhood, and her increasingly desperate attempts to connect with the people around her.

May was unsuccessful at the box office, but received favorable reviews from critics, and is now considered a cult classic.

== Plot ==
May Canady is a young woman working as a veterinary assistant. As a child, she endured bullying and ostracism due to her lazy eye; although her optometrist has fixed it via glasses and corrective lenses, May still struggles to connect with others socially in her adulthood. When May was a child, her mother made and gifted her a glass-encased doll named Suzie, giving her the advice "if you can't find a friend, make one" and instructing her to never remove Suzie from the case. As an adult, May maintains that Suzie is her only true friend.

May becomes infatuated with a local mechanic named Adam, finding his hands especially attractive. She eventually introduces herself to him, and they begin to date. May's colleague, Polly, also shows an interest in her. One day, May remarks that Polly has a beautiful neck. During their flirtation, Polly gives May a cat named Lupe.

May invites Adam to her apartment, where he shows her a short film, titled Jack and Jill, that he made while in college about two young lovers who go on a picnic and end up cannibalizing each other. May becomes aroused by the film. While passionately kissing, she bites Adam's lip, drawing blood. Disturbed, Adam abruptly leaves. Humiliated, May berates Suzie and shoves her into the cupboard.

May begins volunteering at a day care center for blind children, where she takes a liking to a sullen young girl named Petey, who makes her a clay ashtray with May's name pressed into it. Feeling abandoned by Adam, May responds to Polly's advances, which May mistakenly assumes signifies their official monogamous coupling. When May later overhears Adam expressing his disgust for her to his friends, she is devastated and flees to Polly’s house, where she finds her with another woman named Ambrosia. May is horrified, to Polly’s confusion and concern, given the casualness of their sexual relationship. At home, May seeks comfort from Lupe; when Lupe ignores her, May angrily throws Petey's ashtray at her, killing the cat and shattering the ashtray. May soon develops delusions that Suzie is talking to her.

May takes Suzie to the day care center, introducing her to the children as her best friend. The children attempt to take Suzie out of her case despite May's protests, ultimately shattering the case, injuring themselves and May, and destroying the doll, much to May's distress. The following day, May meets a young punk and invites him to her house, where she notices and compliments a tattoo of Frankenstein's monster on his arm. Upon discovering Lupe's corpse in her freezer, he calls May a "freak". May breaks down and fatally stabs him in the head with scissors. After some contemplation, May determines that she needs "more parts".

On Halloween, May, dressed in a homemade costume resembling Suzie, goes to Polly's house, where she slits Polly's throat with a pair of surgical scalpels and stabs Ambrosia in the temples. She then visits Adam and his new girlfriend, Hoop, at his house, murdering both of them with the scalpels. At home, she sculpts a life-sized patchwork doll out of the punk's arms, Polly's neck, Ambrosia's legs, Adam's hands, and Hoop's ears, using Lupe's fur as the hair. Using the shards of the ashtray to form an anagram, she names the doll "Amy". Realizing that Amy lacks eyes, May gouges out her lazy eye and places it into the doll's head. Shrieking in pain and bleeding profusely, May begs the doll to "see" her and collapses on the bed next to it. Her creation comes to life and caresses her face affectionately with Adam's hands; May smiles peacefully.

== Cast ==
- Angela Bettis as May Dove Canady
  - Chandler Riley Hecht as Young May Dove Canady
- Jeremy Sisto as Adam Stubbs
- Anna Faris as Polly
- James Duval as "Blank", The Punk Boy
- Nichole Hiltz as Ambrosia
- Kevin Gage as Papa Canady
- Merle Kennedy as Mama Canady
- Rachel David as Petey David
- Nora Zehetner as "Hoop", Adam's New Girlfriend
- Will Estes as Chris, Adam's Roommate
- Ken Davitian as Foreign Doctor

== Production ==
Writer-director Lucky McKee wrote the initial screenplay for May while still attending film school. McKee has stated that "May wouldn't exist if it weren't for Amanda Plummer's character in The Fisher King." The film was shot in Los Angeles.

== Music ==
May features a score and original songs by Jammes Luckett of the rock group Poperratic (then known as Alien Tempo Experiment 13).

Additional artists on the soundtrack include the Breeders, the Kelley Deal 6000, H Is Orange, Strangels, Thrill My Wife, the Wedding's Off, Angelo Metz, and Tommy James and the Shondells.

Some of Luckett's music from the film was released on the 2007 CD May and Other Selected Works of Jaye Barnes Luckett by La-La Land Records.

In 2022, Luckett's original motion picture soundtrack for the film was released on cassette and vinyl by Terror Vision for Record Store Day.

== Release ==
May premiered at the Sundance Film Festival on January 13, 2002. The following day, it was announced that Lionsgate had purchased worldwide distribution rights to the film for approximately $800,000. In May 2002 the movie was screened at the 55th Cannes Film Festival.

Lionsgate gave the film limited regional screenings in Austin, Texas, and Los Angeles beginning February 7, 2003, which yielded in unfavorable responses, leading the studio to give the film a limited theatrical release in North America. The film opened in New York City on June 6, 2003, followed by a Los Angeles premiere on June 20, 2003.

=== Home media ===
Lionsgate released May on VHS and DVD on July 15, 2003. In 2024, the British distributor Second Sight Films released May in a limited edition region B Blu-ray set.

== Reception ==
=== Box office ===
By the end of its theatrical run, the film had grossed $150,277 in the United States. It eventually grossed $634,803 worldwide on its $1.7 million budget.

=== Critical response ===
The film received favorable reviews from critics. On the review aggregator website Rotten Tomatoes, 70% of 70 critics' reviews are positive, with an average rating of 5.4/10. The website's consensus reads: "Above average slasher flick." Metacritic, which uses a weighted average, assigned the film a score of 58 out of 100, based on 18 critics, indicating "mixed or average" reviews.

Some critics praised the film for its unique atmosphere while also complimenting its brutality through the eyes of someone who is so caught up in their own fantasy world. Bettis' performance was also praised. Roger Ebert granted the film four stars out of four, and called it "a horror film and something more and deeper, something disturbing and oddly moving" and characterized the denouement as "a final shot that would get laughs in another kind of film, but May earns the right to it, and it works, and we understand it". Variety magazine critic David Rooney turned in a review that was more middle of the road, stating that the film was "More successful when the title character finally embarks on her bloody mission than in the dawdling buildup".

The New York Times critic Stephen Holden opined that "the performances are a cut or two above what you would find in the average slasher film. But in the end that's all it is". Scott Brown of Entertainment Weekly awarded the film a B− rating, noting that "though ultimately too waterlogged with student-film self-seriousness to revel fully in its low-rent joie de cleaver, [it] nevertheless taps into a furious atavistic energy that reflects well on the filmmaker and his fully committed cast."

Writing for the Chicago Tribune, Robert K. Elder praised the film as "a refreshing, macabre tale." Kevin Thomas of the Los Angeles Times compared the film's tone to the works of Dario Argento, also praising it for its subversive humor and noting both McKee's direction and Bettis's performance as "rigorous and imaginative." The Austin Chronicle's Marjorie Baumgarten awarded the film a three out of five-star rating, writing that it "comes loaded in a nice psychological package that makes the title character’s madness a logical outcome of her perverse upbringing and extreme social isolation."

Kim Morgan of The Oregonian gave the film a C+ rating, noting: "On paper, it sounds like the start of a good film. Too bad McKee made such a lackluster thing of it. Though the horror comes from an interesting place, it's frequently forced, negating much of the humor and pathos the film attempts to instill."

In 2006, the Chicago Film Critics Association named May the 61st-scariest film ever made.

Bloody Disgusting ranked the film number 17 in their list of the "Top 20 Horror Films of the Decade", with the article calling the film "criminally under-seen at the time of its release... The plotting itself manages to sidestep the usual slasher tropes as it slowly and inexorably unravels, all leading up to a quietly haunting conclusion that is as heart-wrenching as it is unnerving." Albert Nowicki included the film on his list of "best Halloween movies of all time" for Prime Movies. It was also praised by Robert Englund.

=== Accolades ===
Award / Festival	Year of ceremony	Category	Recipient(s)	Result	Ref.
Brussels International Fantastic Film Festival	2003	Silver Raven — International Competition	May	Won	
Brussels International Fantastic Film Festival	2003	Silver Raven for Best Acting Performance	Angela Bettis	Won	
Fancine – Fantastic Film Festival of Málaga	2003	Best Actress	Angela Bettis	Won	
Fancine – Fantastic Film Festival of Málaga	2003	Best Film	Lucky McKee	Won	
Fancine – Fantastic Film Festival of Málaga	2003	Best Screenplay	Lucky McKee	Won	
Fancine – Fantastic Film Festival of Málaga	2003	Youth Jury Award — Best Feature Film	Lucky McKee	Won	
Fangoria Chainsaw Awards	2004	Best Actress	Angela Bettis	Won	
Fangoria Chainsaw Awards	2004	Best Limited Release	May	2nd place	
Fangoria Chainsaw Awards	2004	Best Screenplay	Lucky McKee	Nominated	
Fangoria Chainsaw Awards	2004	Best Supporting Actress	Anna Faris	3rd place	
Gérardmer Film Festival	2003	Premiere Award	Lucky McKee	Won	
Golden Schmoes Awards	2003	Best Actress of the Year	Angela Bettis	Nominated	
Golden Schmoes Awards	2003	Trippiest Movie of the Year	May	Nominated	
Online Film Critics Society Awards	2003	Best Actress	Angela Bettis	Nominated	
Saturn Awards	2004	Best DVD Release	May	Nominated	
Sitges Film Festival	2002	Best Actress	Angela Bettis	Won	
Sitges Film Festival	2002	Best Screenplay	Lucky McKee	Won	
Sitges Film Festival	2002	Best Film	Lucky McKee	Nominated	
Sitges Film Festival	2002	Best Soundtrack	Jaye Barnes Luckett	Nominated	

== See also ==
- List of films featuring Frankenstein's monster
