= Kailia Posey =

American beauty pageant contestant (2006–2022)

- Born: Kailia Lexis Posey; April 19, 2006; Las Vegas, Nevada, U.S.
- Disappeared: Lynden, Washington, U.S.
- Died: May 2, 2022 (aged 16); Birch Bay State Park, Washington, U.S.
- Body discovered: May 2, 2022

Kailia Lexis Posey (April 19, 2006 – May 2, 2022) was an American beauty pageant contestant and reality television personality best known for her appearance on the TLC show Toddlers & Tiaras.

== Career ==
Posey competed in child beauty pageants from the age of three until her death at 16. She was five years old when she appeared on the fourth season of Toddlers & Tiaras, during which she additionally became the subject of the "Grinning Girl" internet meme. Posey won the title of Miss Lynden, Washington Teen in 2021 and Miss Springfield, Missouri Teen in 2022.

== Death ==
On May 2, 2022, Posey was found dead at Birch Bay State Park in Blaine, Washington. Her death was ruled a suicide by asphyxia from ligature hanging.

== Filmography ==
=== Film ===
Year	Title	Role	Notes
2019	Eli	Agnes Thorne	Acting debut

=== Television ===
Year	Title	Role	Notes
2010, 2011, 2016	Toddlers & Tiaras	Contestant	
