= Roman (film) =

- DVD cover
- Directed by: Angela Bettis
- Written by: Lucky McKee
- Starring: Lucky McKee; Kristen Bell; Nectar Rose
- Cinematography: Kevin Ford
- Music by: Poperratic
- Release dates: September 26, 2006 (Fantastic Fest); March 27, 2007 (DVD)
- Running time: 92 minutes
- Country: United States
- Language: English
- Budget: $250,000 (estimated)

Roman is a 2006 suspense-horror film directed by Angela Bettis and starring Lucky McKee (who also wrote the script) as Roman.

== Plot ==
Roman (Lucky McKee) is a lonely young man who yearns to find love, happiness and companionship. Tormented by his ungrateful co-workers and trapped in a life of tedium as a welder in a local factory, Roman's one pleasure is his obsession with the elusive beauty (Kristen Bell) who lives in another apartment in his building complex. When a chance encounter with the young woman goes horribly wrong, a moment of frenzied desperation triggers a chilling turn of events leading to the girl's murder. As he teeters between deranged fantasy and cold reality, Roman's struggle to hide his grisly secret is further complicated by an eccentric neighbor named Eva (Nectar Rose) who develops an unlikely attraction to Roman and forces herself into his dark and tortured world.

== Cast ==
- Lucky McKee as Roman
- Kristen Bell as Isis
- Nectar Rose as Eva
- Ben Boyer as Russ
- Mike McKee as Leroy Lof
- Jesse Hlubik as Jesse
- Chris Sivertson as Lank Worker
- Eddie Steeples as Detective
