= John and the Hole =

2021 film directed by Pascual Sisto

- Official release poster
- Directed by: Pascual Sisto
- Screenplay by: Nicolás Giacobone
- Based on: "El Pozo" by Nicolás Giacobone
- Produced by: Elika Portnoy; Alex Orlovsky; Michael Bowes
- Starring: Charlie Shotwell; Michael C. Hall; Jennifer Ehle; Taissa Farmiga
- Cinematography: Paul Ozgur
- Edited by: Sara Shaw
- Music by: Caterina Barbieri
- Production companies: Mutressa Movies; 3311 Productions
- Distributed by: IFC Films
- Release dates: January 29, 2021 (Sundance); August 6, 2021 (United States)
- Running time: 98 minutes
- Country: United States
- Language: English
- Box office: $26,069

John and the Hole is a 2021 American psychological thriller film directed by Pascual Sisto and written by Nicolás Giacobone. A feature-length adaptation of Giacobone's short story, "El Pozo", the film stars Charlie Shotwell, Michael C. Hall, Jennifer Ehle, and Taissa Farmiga. The film revolves around a boy who discovers an unfinished bunker in the neighboring woods of his home.

The film was selected for the official selection of the 2020 Cannes Film Festival and had its world premiere at the 2021 Sundance Film Festival on January 29, 2021. It was released on August 6, 2021, by IFC Films.

== Plot ==
Thirteen-year-old John Shay comes from an affluent family, living in a luxurious suburban home with his parents, Brad and Anna, and his older sister, Laurie.

On the surface, John's life appears picture-perfect, but deep inside, he feels disconnected and disillusioned. Seeking escape from the pressures and expectations of his privileged existence, John stumbles upon a hidden bunker in the nearby forest. Intrigued and drawn to the idea of control and power, he devises a chilling plan.

Driven by a mixture of curiosity, rebellion, and a desire to assert control, John decides to drug his family members. One by one, he renders them unconscious and carefully drags them into the bunker, trapping them inside it. With his family effectively imprisoned underground, John now has complete control over their lives.

Within the confines of the bunker, the dynamics between the family members slowly unravel. Brad, Anna, and Laurie wake up confused and disoriented, struggling to understand their new reality. As days turn into weeks, tension and desperation mount, revealing the complexities of their relationships and the true nature of their personalities.

John uses his newfound freedom to experience adulthood in every way imaginable, occasionally inviting his friend, Pete, to share while his family suffers in the hole. Days and weeks pass as John slowly but surely starts to become bored with his "adulthood" and soon begins to miss his family who are starting to go mad with hunger.

John eventually leaves a ladder for his family who, upon escaping the hole, find him face down in the pool. Brad, shocked, acts quickly to find that he has not drowned, but was just holding his breath. The film ends with the bunker being filled with dirt and the family resuming life as normal, choosing not to do anything about John's recent actions. Meanwhile, it is revealed that the events of the film were merely a bedtime story being read to a 12-year-old girl named Lily by her mother, Gloria. At the end of the story, Gloria tells Lily that she plans to abandon her and will leave her enough money to survive for one year.

== Cast ==
- Charlie Shotwell as John Shay
- Jennifer Ehle as Anna Shay
- Michael C. Hall as Bradley "Brad" Shay
- Taissa Farmiga as Laurie Shay
- Ben O'Brien as Peter
- Lucien Spelman as Charlie
- Tamara Hickey as Paula
- Elijah Ungvary as Tennis Coach
- Georgia Lyman as Gloria
- Samantha LeBretton as Lily

== Production ==
The film is the directing debut of Pascual Sisto, and was written by Nicolás Giacobone. The film is an adaptation of Giacobone's short story "El Pozo".

Principal photography for the film took place in Massachusetts (Lexington, Lincoln and Norwood). Filming began in October 2019 and lasted 23 days. The soundtrack is by Italian composer Caterina Barbieri.

== Release ==
The film was part of the official selection for the 2020 Cannes Film Festival. The festival did not take place in its physical form due to the COVID-19 pandemic. On a social network, Pascual Sisto confirmed that the film's release was postponed to 2021. In November 2020, the film appeared at Sundance Wish List by IndieWire Sundance Film Festival. The following month, Pascual Sisto was named by Variety as one of the ten directors to watch for 2021.

In January 2021, the film appeared on TheWrap's, Screen Daily's, Hollywood Reporter's and Deadline's list of the most popular films on sale at the Sundance Festival. John and The Hole also appeared on GQ's (Mexico), Vogue's (which was reported in Italy and the United States), IndieWire's, Vox's, Chicago Reader's, Harper's Bazaar's, Vanity Fair's and USA Today's list as one of the most anticipated films.

The film had its world premiere at the 2021 Sundance Film Festival on January 29, 2021. It was released on August 6, 2021, by IFC Films.

== Reception ==
On the review aggregator website Rotten Tomatoes, 60% of 129 critics' reviews are positive. The website's consensus reads: "John and the Hole's enticingly unique premise and disquieting atmosphere are often at odds with a meandering story that prevents this thriller from fulfilling its creepy potential." Metacritic, which uses a weighted average, assigned the film a score of 61 out of 100, based on 22 critics, indicating "generally favorable" reviews.

=== Accolades ===
The film won the Prix de la Révélation at the 47th Deauville American Film Festival and the Crossovers Prize at the Strasbourg European Fantastic Film Festival.
