= Danielle Nicolet =

American actress

- Born: Danielle Diggs; November 24, 1973 (age 52); Ashtabula, Ohio, United States
- Occupation: Actress
- Years active: 1991–present

Danielle Nicolet (born Danielle Diggs; November 24, 1973) is an American actress known for roles on 3rd Rock from the Sun (1996–2001), Second Time Around (2004–05), The Starter Wife (2008), Family Tools (2013), Born Again Virgin (2015–16), and The Flash (2015–23).

== Life and career ==
Nicolet began acting in the early 1990s, appearing in a recurring role on the ABC sitcom Family Matters. In 1996, she landed the role of Caryn on the NBC sitcom 3rd Rock from the Sun, which lasted until 2001. In 2005, Nicolet starred in the short-lived UPN sitcom Second Time Around. Entertainment Weekly named her the network's "breakout star" in review. After the series was canceled, she co-starred on the TNT medical drama, Heartland. That following year, Nicolet had a regular role in the USA Network comedy-drama, The Starter Wife starring Debra Messing, though the series also was canceled after one season. Nicolet has also guest starred on episodes of Stargate SG-1, Angel, The Bernie Mac Show, All of Us, CSI: Crime Scene Investigation, and Warehouse 13.

Nicolet appeared in various films including a small role as Samuel L. Jackson's character's teenage daughter in Loaded Weapon 1 (1993). She later had roles in Melting Pot (1998), opposite Paul Rodriguez and A Wonderful Night in Split (2004). In 2009, Nicolet starred opposite Cuba Gooding Jr. in the thriller Ticking Clock (2009). In 2011, she co-starred in the Syfy original film, Red Faction: Origins, based on the video game. She also voiced Shaundi in Saints Row: The Third and continued to voice her in Saints Row IV and Saints Row: Gat out of Hell. In 2013, she starred in the short-lived ABC comedy series, Family Tools. She later had the recurring role on the BET comedy series, The Game, and guest starred on Elementary.

In 2015, Nicolet guest starred in the first season of The CW's The Flash as Cecile Horton before being cast as the lead in TV One's first original comedy-drama series, Born Again Virgin. She also played the female lead, opposite Kevin Hart and Dwayne Johnson, in the action comedy film Central Intelligence, directed by Rawson Marshall Thurber. After Born Again Virgin ended its run, Nicolet returned to The Flash in a recurring role for the show's third and fourth seasons before being promoted to a series regular from the fifth season till the ninth and final season.

== Filmography ==
=== Film ===
Year	Title	Role	Notes
1993	Loaded Weapon 1	Debbie Luger	
1996	Where Truth Lies	Lisa	
1996	Fall into Darkness	Tracey	TV movie
1996	The Prince	High Class Hooker	
1998	Shadow of Doubt	Cheryl	
1998	Melting Pot	Deuandranice	
1999	Dead Punkz	Freebe	
2003	A Light in the Forest	Britta Rinegelt	
2004	A Wonderful Night in Split	Jeanie	
2006	The Strange Case of Dr. Jekyll and Mr. Hyde	Whitney Weddings	
2006	The Bliss	Daisy Free	
2007	The Weekend	Debbie	TV movie
2009	Knuckle Draggers	Renee	
2011	Ticking Clock	Gina Hicks	Video
2011	Red Faction: Origins	Tess De La Vega	TV movie
2013	Wrestling with Parenthood	Regina Tybor	Short
2014	Naruto the Movie: Blood Prison	Karui (voice)	
2014	All Stars	Kim Lockemer	
2016	Central Intelligence	Maggie	
2016	Believe	Sharon Joseph	
2017	Deidra & Laney Rob a Train	Marigold	
2018	Acrimony	Sara	
2020	Faith Based	Tiffany	
2022	In Training	Boss	Short
2023	13	Her	Short

=== Television ===
Year	Title	Role	Notes
1991–1992	Family Matters	Vonda Mahoney	Recurring Cast: Season 3, Guest: Season 4
1992	The Jacksons: An American Dream	Verla	Episode: "Part I & II"
1995	Step by Step	Rita	Episode: "Head of the Class"
1996	Diagnosis: Murder	Sara Gilbey	Episode: "Murder by the Busload"
1996–2001	3rd Rock from the Sun	Caryn	Recurring Cast
1997	Beyond Belief: Fact or Fiction	Sharon's Friend	Episode: "Number One with a Bullet"
1998	In the House	Dianna	Episode: "Mr. Hill Goes to New York"
1998	Brimstone	Madeline Fuller	Episode: "Slayer"
1999	Moesha	Melanie Trottman	Episode: "Ohmigod, Fanatic"
1999	Grown Ups	Veronica Richmond	Episode: "Bachelor Auction"
2000	Undressed	Cory	Recurring Cast: Season 2
2001	CSI: Crime Scene Investigation	Jennifer Riggs	Episode: "Chaos Theory"
2002	Stargate SG-1	Reese	Episode: "Menace"
2002	For the People	Lane Carhart	Episode: "Racing Form"
2003	Half & Half	Sammi	Episode: "The Big Butting in Episode"
2004	Angel	Tamika	Episode: "Harm's Way"
2004–2005	Second Time Around	Paula	Main Cast
2004–2005	The Bernie Mac Show	Cheryl	Guest: Season 3, Recurring Cast: Season 4
2006	Crumbs	Heide	Episode: "Sleeping with the Enemiesy"
2006	So Notorious	Janey	Episode: "Relaxed"
2007	All of Us	Jill	Recurring Cast: Season 4
2007	Heartland	Nurse Mary Singletary	Main Cast
2008	The Starter Wife	Liz Marsh	Main Cast
2009	CSI: Crime Scene Investigation	Rhonda	Episode: "The Done Dead Train"
2009	Brothers	Amara	Recurring Cast
2010	Marry Me	Candace	Episode: "Part I & II"
2010–2016	Naruto: Shippuden	Karui, Yugao Uzuki (voices)	Recurring Cast
2011	Marvel Anime: X-Men	Ororo Munroe / Storm, Cerebra (voice)	Main Cast
2011	The Protector	Adrian Marsh	Episode: "Wings"
2012	Warehouse 13	Deb Stanley	Episode: "Endless Wonder"
2012–2013	NFL Rush Zone	Shandra, Steeler Stella (voice)	Recurring Cast: Season 2-3
2012–2015	Key & Peele	Various Roles	Recurring Guest
2013	Family Tools	Lisa "Stitch" Bichette	Main Cast
2013	Elementary	Jennifer Sayles	Episode: "Ancient History"
2014–2015	The Game	Yana	Recurring Cast: Season 7-8, Guest: Season 9
2015–2016	Born Again Virgin	Jenna	Main Cast
2015–2016	Da Jammies	LaLa (voice)	Recurring Cast
2015–2023	The Flash	Cecile Horton / Virtue	Recurring Cast: Season 1 & 3-4, Main Cast: Season 5-9
2016	Real Husbands of Hollywood	Ms, Turner	Episode: "Baaack to School"
2017	Supergirl	Cecile Horton	Episode: "Crisis on Earth-X"

=== Video Games ===
Year	Title	Role	Notes
2010	Tom Clancy's H.A.W.X. 2	Sonnet, Additional Voices	
2011	Saints Row: The Third	Shaundi	also motion capture
2012	Marvel Avengers: Battle for Earth	Storm, Black Widow	
2013	Marvel Heroes	Storm, Ms. Marvel	
2013	Grand Theft Auto V	The Local Population	
2013	Saints Row IV	Shaundi	also motion capture
2013	Lego Marvel Super Heroes	Gamora, Maria Hill, Invisible Woman, Ms. Marvel, Storm	
2015	Saints Row: Gat out of Hell	Shaundi	also motion capture
2015	Mortal Kombat X	Jacqui Briggs, Sareena	
2016	Lego Marvel's Avengers	Captain Marvel	Uncredited
