= The Sand =

- Theatrical release poster
- Directed by: Isaac Gabaeff
- Written by: Alex Greenfield; Ben Powell
- Produced by: Gato Scatena; Jordan Rosner
- Starring: Brooke Butler; Meagan Holder; Cynthia Murell; Dean Geyer; Cleo Berry; Mitchel Musso; Hector David Jr.; Nikki Leigh; Etalvia Cashin; Jamie Kennedy
- Cinematography: Mat Wise
- Edited by: Sean Puglisi
- Music by: Vincent Gillioz
- Distributed by: Taylor and Dodge
- Release date: August 28, 2015
- Running time: 84 minutes
- Country: United States
- Language: English

The Sand, also titled Killer Beach, is a 2015 American horror film directed by Isaac Gabaeff and starring Brooke Butler, Meagan Holder and Mitchel Musso. At least one version of the opening credits reads "Killer Beach", but the closing credits give the movie title as "The Sand."

== Plot ==
A large group of friends - including Kaylee, Gilbert, Ronnie, Jonah, Chanda, Mitch, Vance, Marsha, and Heather - are having a party on the beach, leaving their mobile phones in the trunk of a car in an effort to ensure that no one will post compromising pictures or videos online. Vance and Gilbert find a large ball covered in a strange gooey substance and bring it to the rest of their friends.

The next morning, Kaylee and Mitch wake up in the lifeguard shack. Jonah, who is Kaylee's estranged boyfriend, awakens in a convertible next to Chanda, having had sex with her the previous night, along with Vance and his girlfriend, Ronnie. Gilbert wakes up stuck from the waist down in a waste container. Marsha awakens topless on a picnic table. The rest of the teens - those who had fallen asleep directly on the sand, including Heather - are nowhere to be found.

Kaylee witnesses a bird suddenly getting sucked into the sand and tries to warn Marsha, who goes to search for Heather, but Marsha does not listen, and her feet get stuck in the sand. Vance rushes to help her, but trips and falls face-first into the sand; the skin on his face melts off. His and Marsha's bodies are pulled beneath the ground by an unseen force. Kaylee discovers that thin tendrils, barely visible, emerge from the beach and reach towards her hand when she holds it close to the sand. Jonah sees the ball from last night, now cracked in half, and concludes that it is a large egg and that whatever hatched from it has burrowed under the sand.

Unable to access their phones as they are locked in the trunk of the car, the group experiments to determine the creature's reach. Jonah uses two surfboards as a bridge to reach a picnic table. In the process, the creature moves the boards causing him to slip, and slashes his stomach, leaving a painful wound that starts seeping pus. He notes that the creature avoids the ashes of the previous night's bonfire, indicating that it hates fire. While attempting to retrieve their phones, Ronnie crushes her fingers under the trunk's lid.

A beach patrol officer arrives. They implore him to help them, but he dismisses them, believing them to be under the influence of drugs. He walks across the sand unharmed, protected by his boots, but is killed by the creature after dropping his keys and attempting to retrieve them. Kaylee manages to retrieve his pepper spray. Mitch attempts to get to the car with his feet wrapped in towels and covered in pepper spray, but falls onto the sand and is killed.

Kaylee jumps to the car and helps free Ronnie's fingers, then together with Chanda, reach the picnic table where Jonah is injured. While doing so, Kaylee confronts Chanda about her affair with Jonah; Chanda admits she did it out of jealousy. Gilbert cuts his stomach on the edge of the trash barrel. The scent of blood from both Ronnie and Gilbert's injuries attracts the creature, and Ronnie is pulled under the sand when trying to get to the table. Chanda uses Mitch's idea to run across the sand to the truck with pepper-sprayed towels on her feet. The creature, having grown much larger tentacles, pulls Gilbert beneath the sand and knocks Chanda unconscious.

At night, Chanda finds a self-inflatable raft in the truck, which she, Kaylee, and Jonah use to reach the patrolman's car. The ground erupts and a huge glowing tentacle assaults Kaylee. She finds two gas cans on the rear rack and uses them to set one of the tentacles ablaze. The trio lock themselves in the car. Once the tentacles stop, Kaylee and Chanda discover that Jonah has died from his injuries, and begin to cry over the loss of their friends.

The next morning, a man finds the girls in the car, the creature having disappeared. They walk across the sand together, traumatized, as the creature, revealed to be an enormous jellyfish (roughly with a 100 meter diameter or ~7,850 m² surface area), swims toward Santa Monica Pier.

== Cast ==
- Brooke Butler as Kaylee
- Cleo Berry as Gilbert
- Cynthia Murell as Ronnie
- Dean Geyer as Jonah
- Meagan Holder as Chanda
- Mitchel Musso as Mitch
- Hector David Jr. as Vance
- Nikki Leigh as Marsha
- Etalvia Cashin as Heather
- Jamie Kennedy as Beach Patrol Alex
- Michael Huntsman as Unnamed Man

== Home media ==
The film was released on DVD by Monarch Video on October 13, 2015.

== Production ==
This film marked Isaac Gabaeff’s directorial debut, following his extensive experience in Hollywood as a set dresser.

== Reception ==
Critical response to The Sand has been mixed, since the film is notoriously low-budget and has cheap CGI effects:

- Jennie Kermode (Eye for Film) praised its pacing and characterization, describing it as “much smarter than it looks on the surface” and commended the protagonists for being rational and thoughtful.
- Michael Therkelsen (Horror Society) rated it 8/10, calling it "a campy good time" despite noting that the cheap CGI didn't always match the rest of the film's tone.
- Phil Wheat (The People’s Movies / Film4 FrightFest coverage) lauded the gore effects and strong plotting, particularly praising the subversion of standard horror tropes by having female characters lead the escape efforts.
- In contrast, Naila Scargill (Exquisite Terror) criticized the film for its sluggish pacing and limited screen time of the creature, calling it "an arduous watch".
- Matt Boiselle (Dread Central) referred to the film as a “solar disaster” with heavy-handed gore and stereotypical character archetypes, though he suggested it may still appeal as a B-movie midnight watch.

Alternately, Michael Therkelsen from Horror Society rated the film a score of eight out of ten, calling it "a campy good time", while also noting the film's cheap special effects didn't fit with the rest of the film. Jennie Kermode of Eye for Film gave the film three and a half out of five stars, commending the film's quick pacing, and likable characters, writing, "It takes skill to make a cheesy creature feature well. The Sand is much smarter than it looks on the surface. Give it time and it will pull you in." Kat Hughes from The Hollywood News offered the film similar praise, writing, "The Sand takes a silly idea and somehow makes it work, helped greatly by the fact that it has got buckets of charm".

== See also ==
- Blood Beach - a 1981 film with a similar premise
