= Brawler (film) =

2011film by Chris Sivertson

- Directed by: Chris Sivertson
- Screenplay by: Chris Sivertson
- Story by: Nathan Grubbs
- Produced by: Marc Senter; Nathan Grubbs; Jack Grubbs
- Starring: Marc Senter; Nathan Grubbs; Bryan Batt; Michael Bowen; Pell James
- Cinematography: Zoran Popovic
- Edited by: Abe Levy; Phil Norden
- Music by: Ethan Miller
- Production company: GFY Films
- Distributed by: XLrator Media
- Release dates: August 3, 2011 (Fantasia Film Festival); September 14, 2012 (United States)
- Running time: 78 minutes
- Country: United States
- Language: English
- Budget: $999,676

Brawler is a 2011 American action drama film written and directed by Chris Sivertson. It stars Marc Senter and Nathan Grubbs as the Fontaine Brothers. Senter and Grubbs also produced the film through their company GFY Films. The film had its world premiere at the 2011 Fantasia Film Festival.

== Plot ==
In New Orleans, the Fontaine family name echoes the streets within both the traditional boxing community and the illegal underground fight world. Charlie Fontaine's unflinching loyalty turns out to be both his greatest strength and his Achilles heel, while Bobby Fontaine's ambitions and shenanigans, driven by a dangerous amount of ego, turn destructive. Charlie suffers a permanent injury when called to battle to defend his little brother. While Charlie is forced to hang up his gloves, Bobby's guilt drags him to new lows. When Bobby finds himself drawn to Charlie's wife, an all-out war of brother against brother ensues.

== Cast ==
- Marc Senter as Bobby Fontaine
- Nathan Grubbs as Charlie Fontaine
- Michael Bowen as Rex Baker
- Pell James as Kat
- Bryan Batt as Fat Chucky
- Dane Rhodes as Bruce Atwater
- Garrett Hines as Nickels
- Brian Staph as Walter

== Production ==
Brawler was written by Chris Sivertson and was inspired by a true story Nathan Grubbs heard growing up in New Orleans. Filming took place in New Orleans over 24 days in the summer of 2010.
