= Meagan Holder =

American actress

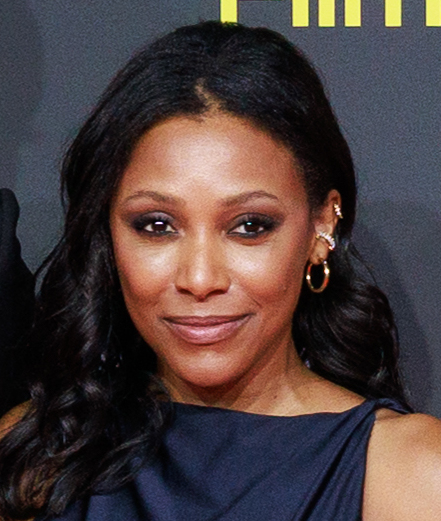
- Holder in 2025
- Education: California State University, Fullerton
- Occupation: Actress
- Years active: 2009–present

Meagan Holder is an American actress, who is best known for her works throughout television. She portrayed Kelly Bowers on the comedy-drama series Born Again Virgin, Evelyn Sanders in drama series Pitch, Noelle Jackson in the drama series Unreal, Claudine on the crime-drama series Ringer, and Darby Conrad on the ABC Family series Make It or Break It. She has also made appearances in various television shows, such as 90210, Victorious, and Criminal Minds.

== Early life ==
Holder graduated from California State University, Fullerton, where she was a member of the Gamma Phi Beta sorority.

== Career ==
In film, Holder co-starred in Bring It On: Fight to the Finish (2009) and You Again (2010). Her other television credits include 90210, Shake It Up, NCIS: Los Angeles and Victorious. She also had six-episode stint as Claudine on The CW series Ringer.

== Filmography ==
=== Film ===
| Year | Title | Role | Notes |
|---|---|---|---|
| 2009 | Bring It On: Fight to the Finish | Kayla | Video |
| 2010 | You Again | Kendall | |
| 2010 | Humbug | Lisa | Short |
| 2013 | Dark Power | Reporter | |
| 2014 | Jersey Boys | Jazz Singer | |
| 2015 | The Sand | Chanda | |
| 2015 | Yellow Day | Taylor | |
| 2016 | Girlfriends of Christmas Past | Megan Walton | TV movie |
| 2019 | Loop Group | Jenna | Short |
| 2019 | If Not Now, When? | Deidre | |
| 2020 | Cooking Up Christmas | Chloe | TV movie |
| 2021 | Queen Bess | Queen Bess | Short |
| 2021 | A Chestnut Family Christmas | Nina | TV movie |
| 2022 | One Way | Christine | |

=== Television ===
| Year | Title | Role | Notes |
|---|---|---|---|
| 2009 | 90210 | Becca | Episode: "The Party's Over" |
| 2011 | Shake It Up | Angie | Episode: "Reunion It Up" |
| 2011 | Make It or Break It | Darby Conrad | Recurring Cast: Season 2 |
| 2011 | NCIS: Los Angeles | Sporty Girl | Episode: "The Debt" |
| 2011–12 | Ringer | Claudine | Recurring Cast |
| 2012 | Victorious | Hope Quincy | Episode: "Andre's Horrible Girl" |
| 2013 | Criminal Minds | Paige Munson | Episode: "Broken" |
| 2013 | Mr. Box Office | Kelly | Episode: "Honor Code" |
| 2013 | Wendell & Vinnie | Marisa | Episode: "Wendell & Vinnie's" |
| 2014 | The Soul Man | Tiffany | Episode: "Back in the Day" |
| 2014 | Rizzoli & Isles | Mallory | Episode: "Burden of Proof" |
| 2014 | Key and Peele | Girl at Bar | Episode: "Parole Officer Puppet" |
| 2015 | Agent Carter | Vera | Episode: "The Blitzkrieg Button" |
| 2015 | Chasing Life | Customer | Episode: "No News Is Bad News" |
| 2015 | Switched at Birth | Meredith | Episode: "We Mourn, We Weep, We Love Again" |
| 2015–16 | Born Again Virgin | Kelly Bowers | Main Cast |
| 2016 | Filthy Preppy Teens | Barista | Episode: "The Running of the Poors" |
| 2016 | Pitch | Evelyn Sanders | Main Cast |
| 2018 | Unreal | Noelle Jackson | Main Cast: Season 4 |
| 2020 | Magnum P.I. | Teresa | Episode: "Farewell to Love" |
| 2021 | Dave | Tessa | Recurring Cast: Season 2 |
| 2022 | Monarch | Kayla Taylor-Roman | Main Cast |

=== Web ===
| Year | Title | Role | Notes |
|---|---|---|---|
| 2010 | Sweety | Shandra | 6 episodes |
