= The Remains (film) =

- Directed by: Thomas Della Bella
- Produced by: Shawn Ebra; Eric B.; Hannah Nordberg; Dash Williams
- Cinematography: Derrick Sims
- Edited by: Thomas Della Bella
- Music by: Giona Ostinelli
- Production companies: Diablo Entertainment; EBF Productions
- Distributed by: Vertical Entertainment
- Release date: 5 August 2016
- Running time: 93 minutes
- Country: United States
- Language: English
- Budget: $200,000

The Remains is a 2016 American horror film written and directed by Thomas Della Bella and starring Todd Lowe as a widower and father named John. In The Remains, John moves his family after his wife passes, but the items that had been left in the house turn out to be haunted.

== Plot ==
In 1891, a couple visit a spiritualist named Madame Addison at 3:00 AM—the so-called witching hour—in order to try to find their lost daughter. Due to demonic intervention, all five people in the house die that night.

Present day, John, whose wife has recently passed, purchases the same house, having no knowledge of the deaths that occurred there more than a century earlier. He is joined by his elder daughter, Izzy, and his two younger children, Victoria and Aiden.

One day, while playing hide-and-seek, Victoria and Aiden come across a chest in the attic containing pictures, an old camera, an old doll, and an old pocket watch. Victoria becomes attached to the doll, saying it reminds her of her mother, while Aiden becomes attached to the old camera.

John becomes concerned, but at the same time finds himself becoming attached to the pocket watch. His concern grows when Victoria faints, and grows further when he has a dream in which he brutally murders Aiden in his sleep. When he questions the realtor, however, she claims to know nothing about the house's history. Meanwhile, his elder daughter, Izzy, remains aloof, caring more about spending time with her boyfriend than being an active member of the family.

One day, in the attic, John sees a girl—the daughter of the couple in 1891. John thinks it's just some girl who has wandered into their house, but she tells him to "burn them," referring to the contents of the chest, before disappearing. John takes the items that had been in the chest away from the kids and places them in a cardboard box at the end of his sidewalk, but the items reappear in the house.

One night, at 3:00 AM, the younger kids, now fully possessed, beat their father nearly to death. When Izzy comes home, she finds her father, on the cusp of death; he tells her to "burn the chest." Izzy goes to John's room, collects the items, takes them to the back yard, and burns them. Unfortunately, it is too late. The ghost of Madame Addison kills John. Izzy and the children (now released from the power of Madame Addison) go back into the house and call 911. The call is disconnected and the lights go out. Madame Addison reappears; killing Izzy, Victoria, and Aiden off-screen.

The film ends with the house being sold to another family by Claire, who remarks that they are right on time, 3:00.

== Cast ==
- Todd Lowe as John
- Brooke Butler as Izzy
- Ashley Crow as Claire
- Samuel Larsen as Tommy
- Maria Olsen as Madame Addison

== Critical response ==
The Remains received generally negative reviews. On Rotten Tomatoes, the film has two reviews, both "splats," and a 9% rating from the audience.
