= Born Again Virgin =

American comedy-drama television series

- Genre: Comedy drama; Romantic comedy
- Created by: Ranada Shepard
- Starring: Danielle Nicolet; Meagan Holder; Eva Marcille; Durrell "Tank" Babbs
- Narrated by: Danielle Nicolet
- Composers: Kenneth Lampl; Adam Lindquist
- Country of origin: United States
- Original language: English
- No. of seasons: 2
- No. of episodes: 14

Production
- Executive producers: Ranada Shepard; Eric Tomosunas; Lamar Chase; Tia A. Smith
- Camera setup: Single-camera
- Running time: 22 minutes
- Production company: Swirl Films

Original release
- Network: TV One
- Release: July 28, 2015 – March 29, 2016

Born Again Virgin is an American comedy-drama series, created by Ranada Shepard, that premiered on TV One on August 5, 2015. The pilot episode preview aired on February 6, 2015. The single-camera project set in Atlanta, and stars Danielle Nicolet as a 30-something writer who decides to become celibate after unsuccessful dates and relationships. Meagan Holder and Eva Marcille co-star as her best friends, while R&B singer Durrell "Tank" Babbs plays her neighbor and love interest.

On September 8, 2015, Born Again Virgin was renewed for a 12-episode second season, which premiered on Tuesday, December 8, 2015. In 2016, Danielle Nicolet announced on social media that the show is not going forward for a third season.

== Cast ==
- Danielle Nicolet as Jenna
- Meagan Holder as Kelly
- Eva Marcille as Tara
- Durrell "Tank" Babbs as Donovan
- Robert Crayton as Scruffy Man

== Reception ==
The premiere episode on August 5, 2015 garnered 264,000 viewers on live broadcast. TV One later announced that the series reached 1.4 million unique viewers P2+, Live +3. On the second week, the live audience grew to 310,000.

== Episodes ==
=== Season 1 (2015) ===
No. overall	No. in season	Title	Original release date	U.S. viewers (millions)
1	1	"Pilot"	July 28, 2015	419,000
2	2	"No New Friends"	August 5, 2015	264,000
3	3	"Go Hard or Go Home"	August 5, 2015	220,000
4	4	"Back on Top"	August 12, 2015	310,000
5	5	"Slaying Your Dragons"	August 19, 2015	205,000
6	6	"Extra"	August 26, 2015	240,000
7	7	"Secret Garden"	September 2, 2015	180,000
8	8	"The Fight"	September 9, 2015	300,000
9	9	"Off to See the Wizard"	September 16, 2015	339,000
10	10	"TMF"	September 16, 2015	279,000

=== Season 2 (2015—2016) ===
No. overall	No. in season	Title	Original release date	U.S. viewers (millions)
11	1	"Home, Sweet Old Folks Home"	December 8, 2015	169,000
12	2	"No Support Hose"	December 15, 2015	180,000
13	3	"We Build Monsters"	December 22, 2015	225,000
14	4	"Sex, Kings and Wigs"	December 29, 2015	262,000
15	5	"Mama-Pause"	February 9, 2016	262,000
16	6	"Jenna Double D's"	February 16, 2016	169,000
17	7	"Call A Spade A Spade"	February 23, 2016	169,000
