= Wicked Lake =

- Directed by: Zach Passero
- Written by: Adam Rockoff; Chris Sivertson
- Produced by: John Carchietta; Carl Morano; Chris Siverton
- Starring: Carlee Baker; Eryn Joslyn; Eve Mauro; Robin Sydney; Michael Esparza; J.D. Brown; Will Keenan; Tim Thomerson
- Cinematography: Stephen Osborn
- Edited by: Kevin Ford
- Music by: Al Jourgensen
- Production companies: Fever Dreams; ZP Studios
- Distributed by: Eleven Arts
- Release date: 26 April 2008
- Running time: 95 minutes
- Country: United States
- Language: English

Wicked Lake is a 2008 American slasher film directed by Michael Thomas Daniel, starring Carlee Baker, Eryn Joslyn, Eve Mauro, Robin Sydney, Michael Esparza, J.D. Brown, Will Keenan and Tim Thomerson.

== Plot ==
Four seemingly innocent women take a trip to a lake house for the weekend. They are followed by deranged men who kidnap and sexually torture them. At the stroke of midnight it is revealed that the women are in fact witches and they begin to get their revenge on the men.

== Cast ==
- Carlee Baker as Mary
- Eryn Joslyn as Helen
- Eve Mauro as Jill
- Robin Sydney as Ilene
- Michael Esparza as Ray
- J.D. Brown as Runt
- Will Keenan as Palmer
- Tim Thomerson as Jack
- Angela Bettis as The Mother
- Marc Senter as Caleb
- Luke Y. Thompson as Half-Idiot
- Justin Stone as Fred
- Mike McKee as Cyrus
- Phoenix Rae as The Daughter
- Al Jourgensen as The Art Teacher
- Frank Birney as Sir Jim

== Reception ==
Johnny Butane of Dread Central rated the film 3.5 stars out of 5 and called the film "pretty damn fun".

Laura Kern of The New York Times called the film an "inept, nasty and absolutely irredeemable entry in the stale torture-porn subgenre of horror that more often than not features bloodthirsty clans residing in the backwoods."

Joe Leydon of Variety called the film a "laughably inept mix of softcore sexploitation and full-bore torture porn".

Aaron Hillis of The Village Voice wrote, "So unimaginatively cheapjack that a rapist has to be told of his vivisection in close-up since there wasn't the budget to actually show it, Wicked Lake proves that even Troma can outclass some."
