= Eli (2019 film) =

2019 American film by Ciarán Foy

- Promotional release poster
- Directed by: Ciarán Foy
- Screenplay by: David Chirchirillo; Ian Goldberg; Richard Naing
- Story by: David Chirchirillo
- Produced by: Trevor Macy; John Zaozirny
- Starring: Charlie Shotwell; Max Martini; Sadie Sink; Lili Taylor; Kelly Reilly
- Cinematography: Jeff Cutter
- Edited by: Jason Hellmann
- Music by: Bear McCreary
- Production companies: Paramount Players; MTV Films; Intrepid Pictures; Bellevue Productions
- Distributed by: Netflix
- Release date: October 18, 2019 (United States)
- Running time: 98 minutes
- Country: United States
- Language: English
- Budget: $11 million

Eli is a 2019 American supernatural horror film directed by Ciarán Foy from a screenplay by David Chirchirillo, Ian Goldberg, and Richard Naing, based on a story by Chirchirillo. It stars Charlie Shotwell, Max Martini, Sadie Sink, Lili Taylor, and Kelly Reilly. The film follows a boy with a rare autoimmune disease who is taken by his parents to a private medical facility to be cured. Netflix released the film on October 18, 2019.

== Plot ==
Young Eli Miller has severe allergic reactions to the outdoors and is forced to live in protective gear. His parents, Rose and Paul, take him to Dr. Isabella Horn's secluded medical facility built in a renovated old house.

Eli is initially overjoyed to remove his "bubble suit" and enjoy comforts previously denied to him. However, he begins to experience supernatural phenomena in the house. He also begins his excruciatingly painful treatments. The specters repeatedly leave the message "lie", and Eli wonders if they refer to Horn's treatments.

Eli befriends Haley, the only person who believes the house is haunted. She tells him none of the other patients Horn treated left the facility. Eli discovers the word "LIE" is the inverted number 317, the passcode to Horn's office. In the office, Eli finds Horn's records of past patients, all of whom were killed by the third and final treatment.

Eli unsuccessfully tries to persuade his parents to get him out of the facility, but Paul sedates him. Hurt and confused, Eli barricades himself in Horn's office. He discovers and enters a hidden passageway to an underground chamber with religious paraphernalia. Horn locks Eli inside the chamber, causing Eli to pass out from the allergic reaction. When Eli awakes, he finds he can breathe fine, and he actually has no disease. Rose, feeling guilty for deceiving Eli, goes to him. When she opens the gate, Eli knocks her unconscious with a crucifix and flees but is recaptured by Horn and his father.

Rose regains consciousness and finds a dagger in the crucifix. She also discovers that the chamber contains the bodies of Horn's previous patients, bound and adorned with religious symbols. She forces her way into the treatment room but Paul restrains her. It is then revealed that Eli is a child of Satan himself, and his "allergic reactions" were him developing demonic abilities. Horn prepares to stab the restrained Eli with the ceremonial dagger, but Eli telekinetically stops the dagger and makes her stab herself. He then levitates the assistants in the air, spins them upside-down (resembling the Cross of St. Peter), then sets them on fire. Eli demands answers from Rose, who reveals she was desperate for a child, and when her prayers to God failed, she prayed to Satan instead, which led to Eli's birth. Paul tries to stab Eli, who telekinetically crushes his face.

Eli and his mother leave the burning house. Haley, who turns out to be another child of Satan, greets them, saying Eli is stronger than his paternal half-brothers and half-sisters. She offers to take Eli to his biological father. Rose drives the two children away from the burning facility.

== Cast ==
- Charlie Shotwell as Eli, a boy who has a rare genetic condition
- Kelly Reilly as Rose, Eli's mother
- Max Martini as Paul, Eli's Father
- Lili Taylor as Dr. Horn, a doctor
- Sadie Sink as Haley, a teenage girl who assists Eli.
- Deneen Tyler as Barbara, a nurse
- Katia Gomez as Maricela, a nurse
- Austin Foxx as Perry, a former patient of Dr. Horns
- Kailia Posey as Agnes, a former patient of Dr. Horns
- Parker Lovein as Lucius, a former patient of Dr. Horns

== Production ==
David Chirchirillo's screenplay was mentioned in the 2015 Black List, compiling the best scripts of the year. In March 2017, it was announced that Ciarán Foy would direct the film, with Ian Goldberg and Richard Naing contributing to Chirchirillo's screenplay. Trevor Macy and John Zaozirny produced the film, while Melinda Nishioka served as a co-producer. Daniel Hammond and Gabriel Hammond executive produced the film under their Broad Green Pictures, Intrepid Pictures and Bellevue Productions banners, respectively.

In October 2017, Charlie Shotwell was cast to star in the film. In December 2017, Sadie Sink and Kelly Reilly also joined the cast. In January 2018, Lili Taylor and Max Martini were also added.

Principal photography began in January 2018 in New Orleans, Louisiana.

== Release ==
In October 2017, Paramount Players acquired distribution rights to the project, and set it for a January 4, 2019, release. However, Netflix bought distribution rights to the film from Paramount after Paramount reportedly could not figure out how to market the film. Netflix released it on their service on October 18, 2019.

== Reception ==
On the review aggregator website Rotten Tomatoes, the film holds an approval rating of 52% based on 25 reviews. The site's critical consensus states, "Intermittently effective if not wholly successful, Eli offers horror fans a handful of jump scares in search of a truly terrifying story."

== See also ==
- Bubble Boy, whose protagonist is also diagnosed with a similar disease.
- David Vetter
