= The Hazing (film) =

- DVD artwork
- Directed by: Rolfe Kanefsky
- Written by: Rolfe Kanefsky
- Produced by: Tom Seidman; James R. Rosenthal
- Starring: Brad Dourif; Brooke Burke; Nectar Rose; Tiffany Shepis
- Cinematography: Thomas L. Callaway
- Edited by: Larry Maddox
- Music by: Christopher Farrell
- Production companies: Honey Creek Pictures; The Hazing LLC
- Distributed by: Lantern Lane Home Video
- Release date: March 6, 2004 (Florida Film Festival)
- Running time: 87 minutes
- Country: United States
- Language: English

The Hazing (also known as Dead Scared) is a 2004 American comedy horror film directed by Rolfe Kanefsky and starring Brad Dourif, Brooke Burke, Nectar Rose, and Tiffany Shepis.

== Cast ==
- Brad Dourif as Professor Kapps
- Brooke Burke as Jill
- Nectar Rose as Delia
- Philip Andrew as Doug
- Tiffany Shepis as Marsha
- Jeremy Maxwell as Roy
- Parry Shen as Tim
- David Tom as Jacob
- Charmaine DeGrate as Justine
- Jeff LeBeau as Doctor
- Robert Donavan as Police Detective

== Release ==
The Hazing premiered at the Florida Film Festival on March 6, 2004.

=== Home media ===
MTI Media released The Hazing on DVD on September 14, 2004. Wild Eye Releasing issued a Blu-ray edition on September 29, 2026.

== Reception ==
The Orlando Sentinel described the film as "a deliriously wild ride of titillation and terror" and likened it to Sorority Babes in the Slimeball Bowl-O-Rama (1988) and The Evil Dead (1981).
