= Nectar Rose =

American actress (born 1974)

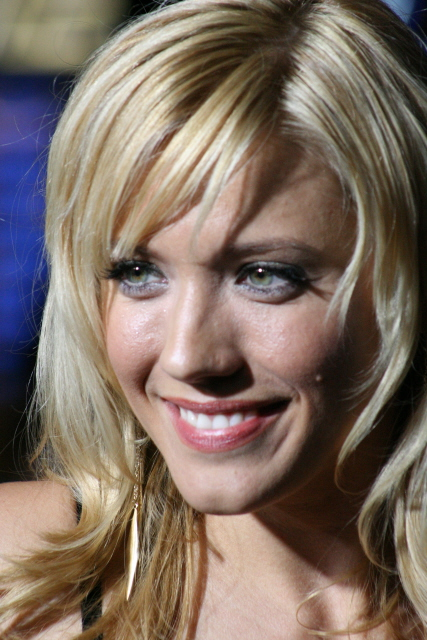
- Nectar Rose at the premiere of Serenity in September 2005.
- Born: Nectar Amber Rose; 1974 (age 51–52)
- Occupation: Actress
- Years active: 1996 - 2015

Nectar Amber Rose is an American actress best known for playing the Gynoid Lenore in the science-fiction film Serenity, a role that required her to maintain a single position for two days of filming.

Her first appearance in a feature film was as a stripper in the blockbuster Independence Day. She earned positive reviews for her performance as Eve in the thriller Roman.

== Filmography ==
| Year | Title | Role | Notes |
|---|---|---|---|
| 1996 | Independence Day | Stripper (uncredited) | |
| 1997 | L.A. Confidential | Marilyn Monroe (uncredited) | |
| 2000 | Bring It On | Nervous Cheerleader | |
| 2001 | Stealing Roy | Butter | Short film |
| 2001 | Spyder Games | Daphne Wallace | TV series |
| 2001 | Legally Blonde | Freshman Girl | |
| 2001 | Off Centre | Danielle | Episode: "Trust Me or Don't Trust Me" |
| 2001 | Not Another Teen Movie | Sara Fratelli | |
| 2004 | 50 First Dates | Blonde in Office | |
| 2004 | The Hazing | Delia Rodgers | Alternate title: Dead Scared |
| 2004 | Able Edwards | Flirty Girl | |
| 2004 | That '70s Show | Kimberly | Episode: "I Can't Get No Satisfaction" |
| 2004 | Pan Dulce | Aubrey | |
| 2005 | A Lot Like Love | Stewardess | |
| 2005 | Tweek City | Cyndi | |
| 2005 | Extreme Dating | Jamie | |
| 2005 | Bad News Bears | Paradise | |
| 2005 | Serenity | Lenore | |
| 2006 | The Iron Man | Karina | |
| 2006 | Sabbia | Wanderer | Video |
| 2006 | Roman | Eva / Dream Girl | |
| 2006 | Two and a Half Men | Dottie | Episode: "The Sea is a Harsh Mistress" |
| 2007 | Kush | Jackie | |
| 2007 | The List | Diana | |
| 2008 | Shattered! | Shelly | |
| 2008 | $5 a Day | Sherry | |
| 2009 | Narcissus Dreams | Hollywood Starlett | Short film |
| 2009 | White Widow | | Short film |
| 2009 | Off the Ledge | Carrie | |
| 2011 | Silver Case | Lady | |
| 2015 | Legs | Flashback Beauty | |
