= Melting Pot (film) =

- Directed by: Tom Musca
- Written by: Mark Kemble; Tom Musca
- Cinematography: Arturo Smith
- Distributed by: A-Pix Entertainment, Ardustry Home Entertainment LLC
- Release date: 1998
- Running time: 104 minutes
- Country: United States
- Language: English

Melting Pot (also known as Race) is a 1998 American drama film directed by Tom Musca, writer and producer of Stand and Deliver.

== Premise ==
Gustavo Alvarez is a Latino house painter who resides in Los Angeles. His wife urges him to compete for a seat on the city council now that Councilman Jack Durman has retired from politics. Alvarez decides to run but soon realizes that it will not be an easy fight. His opponent, Lucinda Davis, is an experienced black politician who is eager to win. As the campaign intensifies, things get nasty, and a race war nearly erupts.

== Cast ==
- Paul Rodriguez - Gustavo Alvarez
- CCH Pounder - Lucinda Davis
- Cliff Robertson - Jack Durman
- Una Damon - Chungmi Kong
- Annette Murphy - Reyna Álvarez
- Efren Ramirez - Miguel Álvarez
- Lillian Hurst - Grandma Álvarez
- Peter Krause - Pedro Marine
- Danielle Nicolet - Deuandranice
- Jude Herrera - Dolores
- Winston J. Rocha - Carlos
- Brian Poth - Walter Cahill Jr.
- Leticia Robles - Latina reporter
- Bruce Sabath - White cop
- John C. Mooney - Walter Cahill Sr.
- Paul Bartel - Moderator
- Luis Guizar - Iannicito

== Reviews ==
It was reviewed with 2,5 stars in Chicago Tribune. Wrote Doug Pratt, "The jacket art tries to sell the film as a gang drama, but it is more of a seriously toned comedy. While exaggerations of the political process prevent it from being totally believable, it does offer insights and humor on a subject that is far less covered than it ought to be in popular entertainment. Best of all, the characters played by Pounder and Rodriguez are neither good nor bad, and the flaws in their characters, acerbated by the stress of the election, brings focus not only to their humanity, but to the realities of American civics".
