= Online Film Critics Society Awards 2003 =

7th Online Film Critics Society Awards

7th OFCS Awards

January 5, 2004

Best Film:
The Lord of the Rings:
The Return of the King

The 7th Online Film Critics Society Awards, honoring films made in 2003, were given on 5 January 2004.

== Winners ==
=== Best Picture ===
The Lord of the Rings: The Return of the King

- City of God
- Kill Bill: Volume 1
- Lost in Translation
- Mystic River

=== Best Director ===
Peter Jackson – The Lord of the Rings: The Return of the King

- Sofia Coppola – Lost in Translation
- Clint Eastwood – Mystic River
- Alejandro González Iñárritu – 21 Grams
- Quentin Tarantino – Kill Bill: Volume 1

=== Best Actor ===
Bill Murray – Lost in Translation

- Johnny Depp – Pirates of the Caribbean: The Curse of the Black Pearl
- Paul Giamatti – American Splendor
- Ben Kingsley – House of Sand and Fog
- Sean Penn – Mystic River

=== Best Actress ===
Naomi Watts – 21 Grams

- Angela Bettis – May
- Scarlett Johansson – Lost in Translation
- Charlize Theron – Monster
- Uma Thurman – Kill Bill: Volume 1

=== Best Supporting Actor ===
Peter Sarsgaard – Shattered Glass

- Sean Astin – The Lord of the Rings: The Return of the King
- Alec Baldwin – The Cooler
- Tim Robbins – Mystic River
- Andy Serkis – The Lord of the Rings: The Return of the King

=== Best Supporting Actress ===
Shohreh Aghdashloo – House of Sand and Fog

- Maria Bello – The Cooler
- Patricia Clarkson – Pieces of April
- Holly Hunter – Thirteen
- Renée Zellweger – Cold Mountain

=== Best Original Screenplay ===
Lost in Translation – Sofia Coppola

- 21 Grams – Guillermo Arriaga
- In America – Jim Sheridan, Kirsten Sheridan and Naomi Sheridan
- Kill Bill: Volume 1 – Quentin Tarantino
- The Station Agent – Tom McCarthy

=== Best Adapted Screenplay ===
The Lord of the Rings: The Return of the King – Philippa Boyens, Peter Jackson and Fran Walsh

- American Splendor – Shari Springer Berman and Robert Pulcini
- Bubba Ho-Tep – Don Coscarelli
- Mystic River – Brian Helgeland
- Shattered Glass – Billy Ray

=== Best Foreign Language Film ===
City of God

- The Barbarian Invasions
- Irreversible
- The Man Without a Past
- The Triplets of Belleville

=== Best Documentary ===
Capturing the Friedmans

- The Fog of War
- Lost in La Mancha
- Spellbound
- Winged Migration

=== Best Animated Feature ===
Finding Nemo

- Cowboy Bebop: The Movie
- Looney Tunes: Back in Action
- Millennium Actress
- The Triplets of Belleville

=== Best Cinematography ===
The Lord of the Rings: The Return of the King – Andrew Lesnie

- Girl with a Pearl Earring – Eduardo Serra
- Kill Bill: Volume 1 – Robert Richardson
- The Last Samurai – John Toll
- Winged Migration – Olli Barbé et al.

=== Best Original Score ===
The Lord of the Rings: The Return of the King – Howard Shore

- Kill Bill: Volume 1 – RZA
- The Last Samurai – Hans Zimmer
- Lost in Translation – Brian Reitzell and Kevin Shields
- Pirates of the Caribbean: The Curse of the Black Pearl – Klaus Badelt

=== Best Art Direction ===
The Lord of the Rings: The Return of the King

- Down with Love
- Girl with a Pearl Earring
- Kill Bill: Volume 1
- Master and Commander: The Far Side of the World

=== Best Costume Design ===
The Lord of the Rings: The Return of the King

- Down with Love
- Girl with a Pearl Earring
- Kill Bill: Volume 1
- Pirates of the Caribbean: The Curse of the Black Pearl

=== Best Sound ===
The Lord of the Rings: The Return of the King

- 28 Days Later
- Kill Bill: Volume 1
- Master and Commander: The Far Side of the World
- Pirates of the Caribbean: The Curse of the Black Pearl

=== Best Visual Effects ===
The Lord of the Rings: The Return of the King

- Kill Bill: Volume 1
- Master and Commander: The Far Side of the World
- Pirates of the Caribbean: The Curse of the Black Pearl
- X2

=== Breakthrough Filmmaker ===
Shari Springer Berman and Robert Pulcini – American Splendor

- Niki Caro – Whale Rider
- Fernando Meirelles – City of God
- Billy Ray – Shattered Glass
- Peter Sollett – Raising Victor Vargas

=== Breakthrough Performer ===
Keisha Castle-Hughes – Whale Rider

- Peter Dinklage – The Station Agent
- Chiwetel Ejiofor – Dirty Pretty Things
- Keira Knightley – Bend It Like Beckham
- Cillian Murphy – 28 Days Later
