= Brooke Butler =

American actress

- Born: January 27, 1988 (age 38); Woodinville, Washington, U.S.
- Education: USC School of Dramatic Arts
- Occupation: Actress
- Years active: 2011–present
- Website: brookeserenebutler.com

Brooke Serene Butler (born January 27, 1988) is an American actress.

== Early life ==
Butler was born in Woodinville, Washington. She has been performing on stage and screen since childhood. She has a bachelor's degree at the USC School of Dramatic Arts.

== Career ==
Butler was cast as zombie cheerleader Tracy Bingham in the 2013 American comedy/horror film, All Cheerleaders Die which premiered at the Toronto International Film Festival. In 2015, Butler played the starring role Kaylee in feature film The Sand. Butler also played starring role of Isabel Fletcher in feature film Online Abduction. Butler played the young Darlene Snell in a 2018 episode of the Netflix series Ozark. In 2018, Butler played the role of Julie Guilford in an episode of the TV series The Resident.

In 2012, Butler was featured on the cover of Swoop magazine. In 2015, Butler was named to Maxim magazine's "Hot 10" Actresses to Watch.

== Filmography ==
=== Film ===
| Year | Title | Role | Notes |
|---|---|---|---|
| 2013 | All Cheerleaders Die | Tracy Bingham | |
| 2015 | Online Abduction | Isabel Fletcher | also known as Cyber Case |
| 2015 | The Sand | Kaylee | |
| 2016 | The Remains | Izzy | |
| 2018 | Night School | ADHD Spokesperson | |
| 2020 | Front Row Killer | Ariana Kent | |
| 2021 | Lantern's Lane | Layla | |
| 2022 | A Day to Die | Candace | |

=== Television ===
| Year | Title | Role | Notes |
|---|---|---|---|
| 2012 | Retribution | Teenage Karen | Television film; also known as Fatal Justice |
| 2015 | Youthful Daze | Flirty Girl | Episode: "Unbreakable" |
| 2017 | Bobby Kristina | Shanna | Television film |
| 2017 | Being Mary Jane | Connie | Episode: "Feeling Tested" |
| 2018 | Ozark | Young Darlene Snell | Episode: "The Badger" |
| 2018 | The Resident | Izzy | Episode: "And the Nurses get Screwed" |
| 2020 | Killer Dream Home | Bliss Leary | Television film |
| 2020 | Creepshow | Mallory | Episode: "Within the Walls of Madness" |
| 2023 | Magnum P.I | Amber | Episode: "Dead Ringer" |
