= Eve Mauro =

American actress

Eve Mauro (born December 21, 1981, Atlanta, Georgia) is an American actress.

== Biography ==
Born to a Sicilian father and a Russian mother, Mauro is the youngest of six siblings. She moved from Orlando, Florida, to Los Angeles at the age of 21 and began her acting career on stage. Mauro's first television appearance was on the series Ugly Betty. She had a recurring role on CSI: Miami and appeared on shows such as Bones, Undercovers, It's Always Sunny in Philadelphia, CSI: NY, Dexter, Torchwood and Men of a Certain Age.

Mauro had dramatic roles besides Val Kilmer in The Chaos Experiment, and C. Thomas Howell in The Grind, both in 2009. She worked alongside Will Ferrell and Danny McBride in the Land of the Lost and landed a role in Miss March the same year. In 2016, she starred in Cyborg X with Danny Trejo.

== Filmography ==
=== Film ===
Year	Title	Role	Notes
2008	Wicked Lake	Jill	
2009	The Chaos Experiment	Jessie	
2009	Miss March	Vonka	
2009	The Grind	Sophia	
2009	Penance	Suzie	
2009	Land of the Lost	Pakuni	
2010	The Trouble with Terkel	Jason (voice)	
2010	Spotlight	Angela McKee	Short
2010	Sex Tax: Based on a True Story	Babs	
2010	The Kane Files: Life of Trial	Wendy Olsen	
2011	Hit Girls	Elizabeth Miller	Short
2011	End of the Innocents	Detective Grace Quinn	Short
2012	Osombie	Dusty	
2012	A Green Story	Betty	
2012	Zombies Vs Strippers	Sugar Hills	
2012	Backtrack 2.0	Sam	Short
2012	Sorority Party Massacre	Brooklyn	
2012	Big Bad Bugs	Tracy Cavanaugh	
2013	The Surrogate	Remy Daniels	TV movie
2013	616: Paranormal Incident	Emma	
2013	SAGA: The Shadow Cabal	Tarsa	
2013	Crazy Town	Maxim Model Dorothy	Short
2013	Misogynist	Sarah	
2013	Zombeo & Juliécula	Ms Ferates	Short
2014	Bullet	Samantha	
2014	The Christmas Dragon	Aesa	
2015	Violence	Gretchen Harris	
2015	Stormageddon	Molly	TV movie
2015	Riot	Allison	
2016	Cyborg X	Lieutenant Spears	
2016	Mythica: The Iron Crown	Admiral Borlund Hess	
2016	The Midnighters	Natalia	
2016	Red Skies at Night: The Story of Flower	Nikki	Short
2016	Spotlight 2	Angela McKee	Short
2017	Fleur	Nikki	Short
2017	Mirror Image	Lindsay Ricci	
2018	Mad World	Lauren	
2018	Junkie	Tabitha Clark	
2018	Crepitus	Brandi (Mother)	
2019	Mother	-	Short
2019	Angel of Death	Talia	Short
2020	Killer Dream Home	Morgan Dyer	TV movie
2021	Agent Revelation	Bell	
2021	Under the Palm Tree	Linda Taylor	
2022	Shadows	Amber	
2022	Last the Night	Kim	
2023	Black Noise	Sarah	
2025	A Working Man	Artemis	

=== Television ===
Year	title	Role	Notes
2006	Ugly Betty	Assistant	Episode: "Queens for a Day"
2007	CSI: Miami	Carmen Henney	Recurring Cast: Season 5
2009	Dexter	Attractive Woman	Episode: "Slack Tide"
2009	It's Always Sunny in Philadelphia	Gwen	Episode: "The Gang Reignites the Rivalry"
2010	Undercovers	Woman	Episode: "Instructions"
2011	Bones	Paisley Johnston	Episode: "The Body in the Bag"
2011	CSI: NY	Heather Marist	Episode: "Vigilante"
2011	Men of a Certain Age	Dancer	Episode: "The Great Escape"
2011	Torchwood	Maria Candido	Episode: "Miracle Day: The Categories of Life"
2015	Gypsi	Gypsi LaSalle	Main Cast
2018	Age of the Living Dead	Marie	Main Cast: Season 1
2018	The Oath	Theresa Winters	Recurring Cast: Season 1
2019	Dystopia	Lauren	Main Cast
2021	Cypher	Reese	Main Cast

=== Music video ===
Year	Artist	Song	Role
2003	Madonna	"Hollywood"	French Maid
