= Angela Bettis =

American actress (born 1973)

- Bettis in 2013
- Born: Angela Marie Bettis; January 9, 1973 (age 53); Austin, Texas, U.S.
- Occupations: Actress; director; producer
- Years active: 1993–present
- Height: 5 ft 3 in (1.60 m)
- Spouse: Kevin Ford (m. 2001, divorced)

Angela Marie Bettis (born January 9, 1973) is an American actress, film producer, and director. Following her breakthrough role as Janet Webber in the drama film Girl, Interrupted (1999), she earned acclaim for her portrayals of Carrie White in the television film Carrie (2002) and the titular character in the psychological horror film May (2002). For May, she won the Brussels International Festival Award for Best Actress, the Catalan International Film Festival Award for Best Actress and the Fangoria Chainsaw Award for Best Actress. She went on to play Belle Cleek in the horror film The Woman (2011) and Mandy in the black comedy film 12 Hour Shift (2020). For 12 Hour Shift, she earned a nomination for the Critics' Choice Award for Best Actress in a Horror Movie.

In addition to her work in film, Bettis also starred in two Broadway productions: The Father in 1996 with Frank Langella and as Abigail Williams in a 2002 revival of Arthur Miller's The Crucible alongside Liam Neeson and Laura Linney.

== Early life ==
Bettis was born on January 9, 1973, in Austin, Texas where she attended Westlake High School. Daughter of Richard Joseph Bettis and wife Mary Lynn Guthrie, she has a twin brother, Joseph Edward "Joe" Bettis. She married in April 2001 and divorced director, cinematographer and documentary filmmaker Kevin Gerard Ford, with whom she founded film producer Productions in 2001.

== Career ==
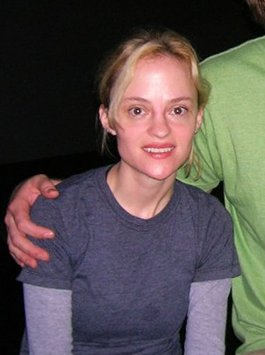
Angela Bettis in 2007.

Her debut role was a lead in the romantic tragedy, Sparrow, directed by Franco Zeffirelli, at the age of 18. She later went on to star in a film called The Last Best Sunday, before landing supporting roles opposite Winona Ryder in Girl, Interrupted and Kim Basinger in Bless the Child.

In 2002, she starred as Abigail Williams in a production of The Crucible on Broadway alongside Laura Linney and Liam Neeson. Bettis is most famous for her work in independent horror films, and especially her professional relationship with writer and director Lucky McKee. Her title role in McKee's 2002 film May earned her a cult following. Since then, she has appeared in McKee's Masters of Horror episode "Sick Girl" and provided a voice-over for his film The Woods. In 2006, their May roles reversed, when McKee acted for Bettis in her directorial debut, Roman, based on a McKee script. In 2011, she played a major role in McKee's adaptation of Jack Ketchum's The Woman.

Bettis starred as Carrietta White in Carrie, a made-for-television adaptation of the 1974 novel of the same name written by Stephen King, in which her performance was singled out for praise. Linda Stasi of the New York Post was positively surprised by her performance and stated that Bettis should win an Emmy. Ron Wertheimer, who wrote for The New York Times, said that Bettis expressed the character's emotions well, and lamented that the film "affords Ms. Bettis few opportunities for such genuine acting".

She starred in Tobe Hooper's Toolbox Murders, an in-name-only remake of an obscure 1970s horror film. She also starred in the crime thriller Scar. She had a guest role on the TV show Dexter's fifth season as Emily Birch, the first victim of Jordan Chase.

== Filmography ==
=== Film ===
Year	Title	Role	Notes
1993	Sparrow	Maria	Original title: Storia di una capinera
1999	The Last Best Sunday	Lolly Ann Summers	
1999	Girl, Interrupted	Janet Webber	
2000	Bless the Child	Jenna O'Connor	
2001	Perfume	Wilemina	
2001	Vallen	Caitlin	
2002	People Are Dead	Angela the Broadway actress	Also producer
2002	May	May Dove Canady	
2002	Coastlines	Effie Bender	
2003	Hollywould	Holly	Short film, also producer
2004	Toolbox Murders	Nell Barrows	
2004	Love Rome	Mary	
2005	The Circle	Jay	
2005	Last Days of America	America the Woman	Short film, also producer
2006	The Woods	Voice in the Woods	Voice
2006	Roman	Elixer Bluff Acting Troup	Voice, also director
2007	When Is Tomorrow	Rachel	Also producer
2007	Scar	Joan Burrows	
2008	Wicked Lake	The Mother	
2008	Blue Like You	Red	Short film
2010	Drones	Amy	
2010	All My Friends Are Funeral Singers	Zel	
2010	My Alien Mother	Mother	Also producer
2011	The Woman	Belle Cleek	
2011	Legs	Jen	Also producer
2012	Sinister	Fran	Scenes deleted
2017	Our Little Secret	Toni	
2020	12 Hour Shift	Mandy	
2021	Ghosts of the Ozarks	Lucille	
2021	The Weird Kidz	Duana	

=== Television ===
Year	Title	Role	Notes
1998	Touched by an Angel	Laura	Episode: "Beautiful Dreamer"
1998	Legacy	Jenna	Episode: "Brother Love"
1999	Sliders	Jill	Episode: "New Gods for Old"
2001	The Flamingo Rising	Alice King	Television film
2001	The Ponder Heart	Bonnie Dee Peacock	Television film
2002	Carrie	Carrie White	Television film
2006	Masters of Horror	Ida Teeter	Episode: "Sick Girl"
2009	House	Susan	Episode: "Broken"
2010	Dexter	Emily Birch	Episodes: "Hop a Freighter", "In the Beginning"
2010–2011	CSI: Crime Scene Investigation	Rosalind Johnson	Episodes: "Fracked", "Turn On, Tune In, Drop Dead"
2013	Criminal Minds	Tess Mynock	Episode: "Alchemy"
2013	Twisted Tales	Lidia	Web series, Segment: "Shockwave"
2015	Dig	Fay	Miniseries
2017	Arkansas Traveler	Myrtle	Web series

=== As producer ===
Producer
Year	Title	Notes
2001	Lovindapocalypse	Video documentary
2002	People Are Dead	Also actress
2002	Lovindapocalypse 2	Video documentary
2003	Hollywould	Short film, also actress
2003	Lovindapocalypse 3	Video documentary
2005	Last Days of America	Short film, also actress
2007	When Is Tomorrow	Also actress
2011	Legs	Also actress

=== As director ===
Year	Title	Notes
2006	Roman	Also actress
2012	The ABCs of Death	Segment: "E Is for Exterminate"

=== Awards and nominations ===
Year	Award	Category	Nominated work	Result
2002	Sitges - Catalan International Film Festival	Best Actress	May	Won
2003	Brussels International Fantastic Film Festival	Silver Raven Award	May	Won
2003	Fancine Awards	Best Actress	May	Won
2004	Fangoria Chainsaw Awards	Best Actress	May	Won
2004	Online Film Critics Society Awards	Best Actress	May	Nominated
2006	Fangoria Chainsaw Awards	Best Actress	Toolbox Murders	Nominated
2012	Chicago International Film Festival	Gold Hugo Award	The ABCs of Death	Nominated
2021	Critics' Choice Super Awards	Best Actress in a Horror Movie	12 Hour Shift	Nominated
