= All Cheerleaders Die =

- Directed by: Lucky McKee; Chris Sivertson
- Written by: Lucky McKee; Chris Sivertson
- Produced by: Lucky McKee
- Starring: Caitlin Stasey; Sianoa Smit-McPhee; Brooke Butler; Tom Williamson; Michael Bowen
- Cinematography: Greg Ephraim
- Edited by: Ben La Marca; Zach Passero
- Music by: Mads Heldtberg
- Production company: Modernciné
- Distributed by: Image Entertainment; Celluloid Dreams
- Release date: September 5, 2013 (TIFF)
- Running time: 90 minutes
- Country: United States
- Language: English

All Cheerleaders Die is a 2013 American horror comedy film written and directed by Lucky McKee and Chris Sivertson. It is a remake of their 2001 low-budget amateur-shot found footage style film of the same name that was also written and directed by McKee and Sivertson, and stars Caitlin Stasey as a cheerleader who must fight against the supernatural. The film had its world premiere on September 5, 2013, at the Toronto International Film Festival and had a limited theatrical release in June 2014.

== Plot ==
The film opens with Mäddy Killian (Caitlin Stasey) recording footage of her childhood friend Alexis (Felisha Cooper) as she prepares for the final days of school before summer break and for cheerleading practice. She discusses how important it is to remain fit and how dangerous cheerleading can be, pointing out how easy it is for some of the more advanced cheerleader moves to end with severe or deadly injuries. This proves to be the case when Alexis is thrown into the air and her teammates fail to catch her in time, resulting in her death.

Once school resumes Mäddy decides that she will try out for the cheerleading team and manages to impress the entire team with her acrobatic skills. After being accepted, Mäddy notes that Tracy (Brooke Butler) has begun dating Terry (Tom Williamson), a star football player who had been dating Alexis prior to her death. She begins to get along with the other cheerleaders; the overly religious and prissy Martha (Reanin Johannink) and her shy sister Hanna (Amanda Grace Cooper), who serves as the cheerleading mascot. This provokes Mäddy's ex-girlfriend Leena (Sianoa Smit-McPhee), who can't understand why Mäddy would want to hang out with the cheerleaders. Unbeknownst to everyone else, Mäddy has actually joined the cheerleading squad to take revenge on Terry for as yet unspecified reasons.

Mäddy begins taking her revenge by convincing Tracy that Terry had cheated on her during the summer and even manages to successfully seduce her at a group gathering of cheerleaders and football players. This greatly hurts Leena (who had been watching the gathering from afar) and angers Terry, who starts a fight, and bans the "dogs" (football players) from dating the "bitches" (cheerleaders).

He then punches Tracy in a fit of anger. The cheerleaders all try to escape the raging football players, only for Terry to cause an accident that claims the lives of all of the cheerleaders. Horrified at what she's seen, Leena manages to revive all of the dead cheerleaders using Wicca magic and magic stones. The following day the girls are all disoriented and scared, especially Martha and Hanna, as they have also somehow swapped bodies.

None of them recollect exactly what happened until Leena reveals to them what occurred the night before. They're also very hungry, which prompts them to attack one of Leena's neighbors and suck out all of his blood. The girls then go to school, where the football players all watch them with disbelief, as they'd thought them all dead. During the day the cheerleaders pick off the football players one by one, either out of hunger or, in the case of Martha, out of anger when she realizes that her sister slept with her boyfriend, Manny (Leigh Parker), using her body.

While the girls were all initially willing to work together, their solidarity unravels due to the day's deaths and the discovery from Mäddy's video diaries that she had joined the squad out of revenge. She tries to explain her cruel criticism of them, but none of the others will listen to her, especially not Tracy, as she had genuinely begun to fall in love with Mäddy.

The only person who will listen is Leena and Mäddy tells her that she had been raped by Terry while attempting to film a memorial video for Alexis and that up until that point, she had not wanted revenge. The girls are then picked off one by one by Terry, who has figured out what is going on and manages to defeat them by cutting out the magic stones (which reside in the girls' bodies) and swallowing them.

Terry manages to corner Mäddy and Leena in a graveyard where he tries to force Leena to show him how to use her magic for his benefit, only for him to die after Mäddy attacks him and Leena's magic somehow manages to force the stones out of him. Mäddy dies again as a result of this but Leena manages to revive her through her own grief, the same thing that caused the original resurrection. The two embrace and kiss, only to find that a bloody Alexis is tearing her way out of Terry's corpse (as he had landed on her grave) and screaming Leena's name. The film then cuts to the title card, which reveals that the film is part one in a series and that there will be a sequel.

== Cast ==
- Caitlin Stasey as Mäddy Killian
- Sianoa Smit-McPhee as Leena Miller
- Brooke Butler as Tracy Bingham
- Amanda Grace Cooper as Hanna Popkin
- Reanin Johannink as Martha Popkin
- Tom Williamson as Terry Stankus
- Chris Petrovski as George Shank
- Leigh Parker as Manchester 'Manny' Mankiewitz
- Nicholas S. Morrison as Ben Fector
- Jordan Wilson as Vik De Palma
- Felisha Cooper as Alexis Andersen
- Michael Bowen as Larry

== Reception ==
Critical reception for All Cheerleaders Die has been mixed. The film holds an approval rating of 48% on Rotten Tomatoes based on 42 reviews, with an average rating of 4.9/10. The website's critical consensus reads, "All Cheerleaders Die sets out to subvert horror tropes, but ends up falling victim to many of the same trashy cliches it's trying to mock." Metacritic gives the film a weighted average score of 45 out of 100, based on 12 critics, indicating "mixed or average" reviews.

Fearnet also gave a positive review, writing: "What's probably most amusing about All Cheerleaders Die is that it will probably earn a lot of rentals from young male horror fans who smile at the idea of five evil succubi and the promise of some lesbian kissing -- when it's actually a very smart and subversive satire about the way women are (very) often objectified in horror films." In contrast, Reel Film panned the film as being overly bland and not fully utilizing its premise, which the reviewer felt had promise.
