= The Woods (2006 film) =

2006 American supernatural horror film

- Theatrical release poster
- Directed by: Lucky McKee
- Written by: David Ross
- Produced by: Bryan Furst; Sean Furst
- Starring: Agnes Bruckner; Patricia Clarkson; Bruce Campbell; Lauren Birkell; Rachel Nichols
- Cinematography: John R. Leonetti
- Edited by: Dan Lebental; Joel Plotch
- Music by: John Frizzell
- Production companies: Furst Films; United Artists
- Distributed by: Sony Pictures Home Entertainment
- Release dates: July 9, 2006 (Fantasia Festival); September 26, 2006 (Fantastic Fest); October 3, 2006 (U.S.)
- Running time: 91 minutes
- Country: United States
- Language: English
- Budget: $8 million

The Woods is a 2006 American supernatural horror film directed by Lucky McKee and starring Agnes Bruckner, Patricia Clarkson, Rachel Nichols, Lauren Birkell, and Bruce Campbell. Set in 1965, its plot concerns a wayward teenage girl who is sent to a New England all-girls private high school which holds an ominous secret related to the staff, history and woods surrounding the school.

Filmed in Montreal in 2004, The Woods had a protracted post-production process after its production company, United Artists, was sold after principal photography completed. The film's original score was composed by John Frizzell, with percussion from Jane's Addiction drummer Stephen Perkins. The soundtrack features multiple songs by Lesley Gore.

The Woods had its world premiere at the Fantasia International Film Festival on July 9, 2006, before it was released directly-to-video in the United States by Sony Pictures Home Entertainment on October 3, 2006.

== Plot ==
In 1965, rebellious teenager Heather Fasulo is sent to the boarding school Falburn Academy, run by headmistress Ms. Traverse and located in the middle of the woods. Heather becomes close friends with Marcy Turner, while they are abused by their abusive classmate Samantha Wise. During the night, Heather has a nightmare about a blood-soaked student named Ann and hears voices coming from the woods; she learns the next day that Ann was institutionalized after a suicide attempt.

Heather eventually learns to adjust to the school. Ms. Traverse subjects Heather to tests to see if she is "gifted". The girls tell Heather a spooky story about the history of Falburn, which includes three young redheaded sisters who arrived at the school and turned out to be witches, killing the headmistress before leaving to the woods. Heather begins to fight back against Samantha's continued torment. Ann returns from the institution; after Heather finds her rocking in her bed one night, Ann reveals that she is afraid she will be taken by the witches. Heather climbs on a trunk to try and close an open window; a low fog rushes into the room and knocks Heather down, twisting her ankle. The next day, Heather finds Ann's bed empty, her place filled with dead leaves.

Heather witnesses the headmistress lying to the police about Ann's disappearance. She tries to talk to Marcy about her suspicions, but Marcy acts strangely; soon after, Heather finds Marcy's bed empty and covered in leaves. Later, she is confronted in the woods by Samantha, who tells her that the school is led by a coven of witches, and that her bullying was intended to drive Heather away to protect her. She also reveals that she has called Heather's father to help her escape and that the school's milk is poisoned. The girls are caught by a school mistress, who takes Samantha away; her body is later found hanging in the cafeteria. Heather tells a police officer about the missing students, but the headmistress claims they simply ran away. Another mistress leads the officer into the woods to find the girls, where he is killed by the living vines of a tree.

Heather's parents show up to take her home. On the way home, their car is mysteriously flipped and Heather is knocked unconscious, while her mother is dragged out of the car by a vine. Heather and her father Joe wake up in a hospital. Ms. Traverse has Heather dragged away, then slits her own hand and forces her black blood down Joe's throat, rendering him catatonic. Heather returns to the school, where she drinks the milk, but later vomits it back up, finding tree bark in it. At the hospital, Joe wakes up and vomits up the blood, which also has tree bark in it. He escapes and looks for Heather. That night, Heather begins to hear voices again, and when she attempts to leave, a vine captures her.

She awakens wrapped in vines in a large room next to Ann and Marcy, who are also captive. All of the teachers appear and reveal themselves to be witches. Ms. Traverse is their leader, and she explains that their spirits have been trapped in the woods all these years, and they need to inhabit the bodies of young women to escape their imprisonment, with Heather as the centerpiece of her plan since she has the strongest powers. Heather is coerced into carrying out the ritual, and the vines begin to mummify all of the girls in the school. Before the ritual is complete, Joe breaks into the room with an ax and attacks one of the witches before being seized by vines. Heather breaks free and chops all of the witches into pieces. Heather and Joe then leave with all of the girls as the school burns in the distance behind them.

== Cast ==
- Agnes Bruckner as Heather Fasulo
- Emma Campbell as Alice Fasulo
- Bruce Campbell as Joe Fasulo
- Patricia Clarkson as Ms. Traverse
- Rachel Nichols as Samantha Wise
- Lauren Birkell as Marcy Turner
- Kathleen Mackey as Ann Whales
- Jane Gilchrist as Ms. Cross
- Catherine Colvey as Ms. Leland
- Marcia Bennett as Ms. Mackinaw
- Cary Lawrence as Ms. Charevoix
- Colleen Williams as Ms. Arbor
- Gordon Currie as The Sheriff
- Melissa Altro as Barb (credited as Missy Altro)
- Maia Balestriri as Jen (credited as Maïa Balestrieri)
- Maggie Castle as Tracy
- Amber Cull as Mara

== Production ==
=== Development ===
After directing May (2002), Lucky McKee optioned the screenplay for The Woods, written by David Ross, to United Artists. While attending a screening of May at the Sitges Film Festival, he met his future wife, Vanessa, a storyboard artist who presented him a drawing of that film's title character. Once United Artists approved The Woods for production, McKeen asked Vanessa to collaborate on the project as a storyboard artist. Vanessa extensively completed the majority of the storyboards for the film using white pencil on black paper.

=== Filming ===
The Woods was shot in 2004 at Mels Cité du Cinema in Montreal, Quebec, Canada. In a 2025 interview, McKee estimated the budget was $8 million.

=== Post-production ===
During post-production, United Artists head Bingham Ray was replaced after the studio was bought out, resulting in some tension between McKee and the company. Following a test screening, McKee received overwhelmingly negative responses from audience members, resulting in United Artists firing the post-production team and hiring replacements. Angela Bettis, the star of McKee's previous film, May, recorded the ambient voices heard throughout the film that emanate from the woods. The post-production process was completed by early 2005.

== Music ==
McKee's father, who graduated high school in 1965—the year The Woods is set—was inspired to incorporate several Lesley Gore songs into the film's soundtrack, as Gore was one of his father's favorite singers. The film features Gore's popular hits, "Young and Foolish", "You Don't Own Me", and "Just Let Me Cry".

The film's original musical score was composed by John Frizzell, and included percussion from Jane's Addiction drummer Stephen Perkins.

== Release ==
The Woods had its North American premiere at the Fantasia Film Festival in Montreal on July 9, 2006. The film's distributor, United Artists, planned for a theatrical release through MGM Distribution Co., but it was shelved after Sony Pictures bought out United Artists' parent company, Metro-Goldwyn-Mayer, in 2005.

=== Home media ===
Sony Pictures Home Entertainment released The Woods on DVD on October 3, 2006.

On September 22, 2015, Olive Films released it on Blu-ray. Arrow Films released a limited edition Blu-ray set in the United Kingdom on September 15, 2025.

== Reception ==
On the review aggregator website Rotten Tomatoes, 67% of 15 critics' reviews are positive, with an average rating of 6.1/10.

Michael Gingold of Fangoria praised the film's use of color and Bruckner's lead performance, and compared it to Dario Argento's Suspiria (1977) as well as the works of other Italian horror filmmakers such as Lucio Fulci. Dread Central's review of the film summarized: "The Woods is solid and satisfying. Chillingly punctuated by vivid nightmare sequences and harrowing confrontations between students, teachers, and the woods themselves, the flow of fear heads in only one direction… off the proverbial beaten path where it’s happy to reveal the sinister fairytale that lies at the heart of every darkened forest."

Brian Holcomb of the independent film review website Beyond Hollywood wrote: "The Woods plays like a classic Lewton film of the 1940s, where the emphasis was on telling a good yarn without much ado and wrapping it up in a tightly wound 70 minutes." Film journalist Nick Schager noted that the film "proves to be one of the most polished and inventive horror flicks of the still-ongoing year, a synthesis of classical supernatural and sexualized imagery that expands upon, rather than simply regurgitates, its celebrated predecessors," and compared it to Suspiria (1977) and Carrie (1976). DVD Talk's Scott Weinberg praised the film's performances as "uniformly excellent" and also praised the cinematography and musical score.

In his book Horror Films of 2000-2009 (2023), John Kenneth Muir praised the film's cinematography and classified it as a "prestigious, "A"-type horror film with a quality cast," but felt that the film ultimately lacked suspense. In a 2023 retrospective for Bloody Disgusting, Paul Lê wrote favorably of the film: "Beautiful and deliberately paced, this film stands out in Lucky McKee’s output so far; it blends formative fantasy with horror as well as acts like a gothic allegory in the vein of Carlos Enrique Taboada’s oeuvre."

== See also ==
- List of films about witchcraft

== Sources ==
- Kackman, Michael; Binfield, Marnie; Payne, Matthew Thomas; Perlman, Allison; Sebok, Bryan, eds. (2010). Flow TV: Television in the Age of Media Convergence. New York City, New York: Routledge. p. 157. ISBN 978-1-135-85094-4.
- Muir, John Kenneth (2023). Horror Films of 2000-2009. Jefferson, North Carolina: McFarland & Company. ISBN 978-1-476-64450-9.
