= Pascual Sisto =

Filmmaker and visual artist

- Born: 1975 (age 50–51); Ferrol, Spain
- Education: ArtCenter College of Design; University of California, Los Angeles
- Occupations: filmmaker visual artist
- Notable work: John and the Hole, Océano
- Website: pascualsisto.com

Pascual Sisto (born 1975, Ferrol, Spain) is a Spanish filmmaker and visual artist. His works were exhibited in international galleries and museums, such as the Pompidou Center, the MAK Center for Art and Architecture, the Istanbul Museum of Modern Art and the 53rd Venice Biennale.

John and the Hole, the film that marks his directorial debut, was selected for the Cannes 2020 and Sundance 2021 film festivals. Sisto was named by Variety as one of the ten directors to watch in 2021.

== Biography and career ==
=== Education ===
Sisto graduated from ArtCenter College of Design in Pasadena, California, where he obtained a Bachelor of Fine Arts in Film. In 2007, he obtained a master's degree in media arts from the University of California, Los Angeles. Sisto also attended the Skowhegan School of Painting and Sculpture in 2011, and received grants from the California Community Foundation Emerging Artist in 2012, ARC Durfee Foundation in 2011 and NYSCA/NYFA Artist Fellowship in Digital and Electronic Arts in 2017. In 2017 he was awarded a residency in Visual Arts at Pioneer Works in Brooklyn, and the 2019 Artistic Residency of the Lower Manhattan Cultural Council Workspace.

=== Career ===
In 2003, due to the short film Océano, in which he worked as a director and screenwriter, Sisto won the Kodak Vision Award at the Rhode Island International Film Festival. In 2009, he presented art exhibitions at the Istanbul Museum of Modern Art and at the 53rd Venice Biennale. In 2010, he was one of the artists selected by the Department of Cultural Affairs and LAX to create a permanent exhibition at the Tom Bradley International Terminal.

His art exhibitions have already been reviewed by Art in America, Flash Art, Los Angeles Times and Vice.

In October 2019, Sisto started shooting the feature film that marks his directorial debut, John and the Hole, which was written by Nicolás Giacobone. John and the Hole was selected for the 2020 Cannes Film Festival and 2021 Sundance film festival, which placed Sisto on Variety's list of ten directors to watch in 2021. In January 2021, the movie appears on TheWrap, Screen Daily, Hollywood Reporter, Deadline and IndieWire's lists of the most anticipated films at the Sundance Film Festival. It was released on August 6, 2021, by IFC Films.

== Filmography ==
=== Films ===
- 2003: Océano (short film, director and screenwriter)
- 2021: John and the Hole (director)

=== Online ===
- 2017: Steps (co-director, producer and executive producer)

== Award ==
Year	Festival	Category	Work	Result
2003	Rhode Island International Film Festival	Grand Prize Kodak Vision Award	Océano	Won
2021	Deauville American Film Festival	Prix de la Révélation	John and the Hole	Won
2021	Strasbourg European Fantastic Film Festival	Crossovers Prize	John and the Hole	Won
