= Sianoa Smit-McPhee =

Australian actress

- Born: Adelaide, South Australia
- Occupations: Actress, singer
- Years active: 2004–present
- Spouse: John Rush (m. 2012)
- Relatives: Kodi Smit-McPhee (brother)

Sianoa Smit-McPhee is an Australian actress and singer. From 2005 until 2007, she played Bree Timmins in the Australian soap opera Neighbours. She starred in As the Bell Rings, the HBO series Hung, and The Kettering Incident. She has also appeared in the feature films All Cheerleaders Die (2013) and Fallen (2016).

== Early life ==
Smit-McPhee was born in Adelaide to Sonja Smit and Andy McPhee, an actor and former professional wrestler. She has six siblings from her father's three marriages, including Kodi Smit-McPhee, who is also an actor. Smit-McPhee attended Croydon Primary and Allenby Gardens Primary, before she moved to Melbourne with her family when she was seven years old. Her father got her into acting when she was three years old and she starred in a number of commercials.

== Career ==
After signing to her father's agents, Smit-McPhee secured a role in police drama Blue Heelers as a child with gender dysphoria. She had to cut her long hair for the role. Shortly after, she won the role of Bree Timmins in the long-running Australian TV series Neighbours, which she played from 2005 to 2007. After leaving Neighbours, Smit-McPhee starred in the children's television series As the Bell Rings, which aired on the Disney Channel. She also starred in the 2008 short film Hugo, which had its Australian premiere at the Canberra Short Film Festival. The film centres on a school girl (Smit-McPhee) who finds a moth-boy and tries to win a science competition with him.

From 2009 to 2011, Smit-McPhee starred in the HBO series Hung as Darby Drecker. It marked her first American television appearance. Smit-McPhee had relocated to the United States with her family, while her brother was shooting a feature film, and she was encouraged by her agent to audition for HBO. She was the first actor cast in the show.

Smit-McPhee made her feature film debut in the 2011 American sports film Touchback, alongside Kurt Russell. In 2012, she featured in the American Broadcasting Company's television film Firelight, as well as the series It's Always Sunny in Philadelphia. The following year, she starred in All Cheerleaders Die, alongside her former Neighbours co-star Caitlin Stasey. Smit-McPhee and her husband also wrote and produced the song "Take a Bite of My Heart", which was featured in the film and performed by her. In 2014, she guested in an episode of Criminal Minds, and appeared in the thriller film Mall.

After living in Los Angeles for around ten years, Smit-McPhee moved back to Australia to launch her music career. She played at the Adelaide Fringe in March 2017. She also appeared in The Kettering Incident, which was filmed in Tasmania, and the 2016 feature film Fallen.

== Personal life ==
Smit-McPhee has been married to American music producer John Rush since 2012.

== Filmography ==
Film roles
Year	Title	Role	Notes
2008	Hugo	Desma	Short film
2012	Touchback	Sasha	
2013	All Cheerleaders Die	Leena Miller	
2014	Mall	Shel	
2016	Fallen	Molly Zane	

Television roles
Year	Title	Role	Notes
2004	Blue Heelers	Charlie Campbell	Episode: "One of the Boys"
2005–2007	Neighbours	Bree Timmins	Main cast
2007–2009	As the Bell Rings	DJ	Main role
2009–2011	Hung	Darby Drecker	Main role
2012	It's Always Sunny in Philadelphia	Bridesmaid	Episode: "The Maureen Ponderosa Wedding Massacre"
2012	Firelight	Tammy	Television film
2014	Criminal Minds	Sue Walsh	Episode: "Gabby"
2016	The Kettering Incident	Chloe Holloway	Main role
