= Chris Sivertson =

American filmmaker

Chris Sivertson is an American filmmaker.

== Biography ==
Sivertson's first film was All Cheerleaders Die (2001), which he also wrote and directed together with Lucky McKee. In 2003 Sivertson and Kevin Ford co-directed a documentary titled Toolbox Murders: As It Was about the making of Tobe Hooper's 2003 film Toolbox Murders. In 2006 Sivertson and Eddie Steeples co-wrote and co-directed The Best of Robbers, starring Steeples. Sivertson's film The Lost (2006) adapted Jack Ketchum's crime novel.

His next film, I Know Who Killed Me (2007) starring Lindsay Lohan, was not well received by critics and went on to win several Golden Raspberry Awards. However, the film subsequently developed a cult following, with screenings at the Los Angeles Silent Movie Theater and the NuArt, and has been favorably compared by Boston Globe critic Ty Burr to Brian de Palma's Sisters and Body Double as well as the works of David Lynch.

Sivertson has written and produced other films, including Wicked Lake (2008). He wrote and directed the 2011 sports film Brawler. All Cheerleaders Die is a 2013 horror film that was directed by Lucky McKee and Sivertson. The film is a remake of the 2001 film All Cheerleaders Die.

Sivertson's film Shattered Memories debuted on TV in 2018. In 2022, he directed Monstrous starring Christina Ricci. In 2026, he wrote the action film Conspiracy of Thieves, directed by Randall Emmett.
