= Sick Girl (Masters of Horror) =

- Masters of Horror episode
- DVD cover for Sick Girl
- Episode no.: Season 1 Episode 10
- Directed by: Lucky McKee
- Written by: Sean Hood
- Production code: 110
- Original air date: January 13, 2006

Guest appearances
- Marcia Bennett; Chandra Berg; Angela Bettis; Jesse Hlubik; Erin Brown

Episode chronology
← Previous "Fair-Haired Child"	Next → "Pick Me Up"

"Sick Girl" is the 10th episode of the first season of Masters of Horror. It originally aired in North America on January 13, 2006. It was directed by Lucky McKee and based on a story written by McKee and Sean Hood.

== Plot ==
Ida Teeter (Angela Bettis) is a shy entomologist who has a wide variety of insects all over her home, which caused her girlfriend to break up with her. Ida is introduced to the beautiful and strange girl Misty Falls (Erin Brown), and is drawn to her. A mysterious package arrives for Ida one day, containing a large unidentifiable mantis-like insect. Landlady Lana Beasley is concerned with Ida's "pets" and the effect that may be laid upon her ten-year-old granddaughter Betty, who likes to disguise herself as a ladybug. Betty in turn looks up to Ida, much to Beasley's dismay, and Ida promises to keep the insects under check. Later that night, she examines the new insect, which she fondly names "Mick", and informs her friend Max of the creature. Meanwhile, "Mick" escapes from his tank and attacks Beasley's pet dog, consuming the animal.

The next day, Ida asks Misty out. They go on a date, and Misty asks if they can watch a movie about "Texas Pixies" on Ida's DVD player, which Ida accepts. Misty is introduced to Betty and the apartment, though Ida keeps her away from the bedroom where all her insects are hidden. The two get closer until interrupted by Max. Ida returns to find Misty asleep on the couch. She returns with a pillow (that has Mick inside) to give to Misty. In gratitude for Ida allowing her to stay, Misty returns the favor by seducing Ida. Unknowingly, Mick's proboscis nips Misty's ear, which Misty dismisses.

The next morning, Ida awakens to find that Misty has discovered her secret bug stash and has a great interest in bugs. They spend more time together, although Misty becomes weak and begins displaying unusual tendencies. Misty later comes across the pillow with Mick in it, and discovers that she has strange urges to lie next to it; the insect invades her much-chewed and saliva-doused ear with its proboscis. Ida receives an almost apologetic letter from a mysterious source, which tells her that the insect could be dangerous. At home, she is pulled into a loving kiss by Misty right in front of Beasley and Betty. Disgusted, Beasley gives Ida and Misty one week to move out. Ida is horrified by Misty's strange behavior and crude remarks. Enraged, Misty yells at Ida and suddenly passes out.

Misty awakens and explains about a dream where she was a fairy and encountered Mick, who forced its proboscis into her navel, drawing blood and inserting "his juices" into her. Max calls Ida, and as she leaves, Ida notices how Misty has placed the pillow between her legs. When she arrives, Max explains the insect: It is known to inhabit the nests of birds and other small animals, where it behaves like a parasite, inserting its proboscis and drinking the animal's blood, while invading the host's reproductive DNA and making them carry out the insect's young. Ida is horrified to learn that Misty may have been bitten by Mick.

Mick inseminates Misty during another sexual intercourse. Beasley encounters Misty, who morphs two insectoid eyes and multiple tendrils, and the terrified Beasley falls down the stairway to her death. Ida arrives home to witness medics hauling away the corpse of Beasley, and Betty crying. Ida calls Max over and is convinced that the insect has infected Misty, who then reveals her own secret: Her father, Professor Malcolm Wolf and Ida's former tutor, sent the insect to Ida so it would bite her and make her repulsive to Misty, who has long been in love with Ida. Misty then undergoes metamorphosis into a bug-human monster. Responding to Ida's screams, Max breaks into the apartment, only to be killed by Misty. Mick scurries to the terrified Ida and inserts its proboscis into her ear, initiating the same insemination process with her.

Some time later, Ida and Misty are sitting with large pregnant bellies, joking about their condition, as Mick continues to inseminate them through their ears.

== Production ==
The story was written by Lucky McKee and Sean Hood and shares similarities with Uruguayan author Horacio Quiroga's horror tale The Feather Pillow, first published in 1917. In this tale, a woman is drained to death by a vampire bug hidden inside her pillow. The creature sucks her blood off her temper, causing hallucinations, nightmares and severe anemia.

== DVD and Blu-ray ==
The DVD was released by Anchor Bay Entertainment on June 27, 2006. The episode was the tenth episode and the sixth to be released on DVD. The episode appears on the second volume of the Blu-ray compilation of the series.
