= Lucky McKee =

American actor (born 1975)

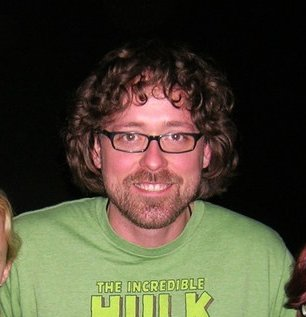
- McKee in March 2007
- Born: Edward Lucky McKee; November 1, 1975 (age 50); Jenny Lind, California, U.S.
- Occupations: Writer, producer, director, actor

Edward Lucky McKee (born November 1, 1975) is an American director, writer, and actor, largely known for the 2002 cult film May. He is best known for his work in horror films.

== Life and career ==
McKee was born in Jenny Lind, California. He has directed "Sick Girl", the 10th episode of the first season of the popular Showtime TV series Masters of Horror. He directed the film The Woods, which was released on DVD October 3, 2006. Lucky McKee also co-directed the hard-to-find horror film All Cheerleaders Die, which is not currently in print.

McKee optioned Jack Ketchum's novel The Lost and produced the film adaptation directed by Chris Sivertson. McKee also adapted Ketchum's Red, and co-directed the film, which premiered out of competition at the 2008 Sundance Film Festival. Shooting was halted when Red was almost completed, with McKee as director, in December, 2006. Shooting resumed in Maryland following a hiatus of more than six months, with a different director, Norwegian Trygve Allister Diesen. No explanation has been offered for the shared directing credit.

In 2013, a remake of All Cheerleaders Die was written and directed by McKee and Chris Sivertson. He also directed and wrote the segment "Ding Dong" of the anthology film Tales of Halloween.

== Filmography ==
=== As director (feature-length) ===
- All Cheerleaders Die (2001, co-directed with Chris Sivertson)
- May (2002)
- The Woods (2006)
- Red (2008, directed part of the film before being removed and replaced with Trygve Allister Diesen)
- The Woman (2011)
- All Cheerleaders Die (2013, co-directed with Chris Sivertson, remake of the 2001 film)
- Blood Money (2017)
- Kindred Spirits (2019)
- Old Man (2022)

=== As director (short form) ===
- "Sick Girl" (2006, episode of the TV series Masters of Horror)
- "Blue Like You" (2008, short film)
- "Ding Dong" (2015, segment of the anthology film Tales of Halloween)
- "I Got It Bad (And That Ain't Good)", a music video for AJ Lambert (2021)
- "Time of the Monkey" (2023, episode of the TV series Poker Face)
- "The Taste of Human Blood" (2025, episode of the TV series Poker Face)

=== As an actor ===
- Evil Demon Golfball from Hell!!! (1996, short film by Rian Johnson) as Woodsy
- The Big, Weird Normal (2002) as Weegee and Bean
- May (2002) as Guy Making Out in Elevator
- Hollywould (2003) as Friend
- Roman (2006, also writer) as Roman
- Blue Like You (2008) as Patrick
