= The Woman (novel) =

2010 book

- First edition cover
- Author: Jack Ketchum; Lucky McKee
- Language: English
- Genre: Horror
- Publication date: 2010
- Publication place: United States
- Media type: Print
- Preceded by: Offspring

The Woman is a horror novel written by Jack Ketchum and Lucky McKee. It was later adapted into a film directed by McKee. It is a sequel to Ketchum's Off Season and Offspring.

== Plot ==
After the events of Offspring, the Woman is now the last remaining member of a cannibalistic tribe that has roamed the Northeast coast for decades. Chris Cleek, a misogynistic country lawyer, captures her and directs his family to participate in "civilizing" her.

== Development ==
The Woman was in part inspired by the performance of actress Pollyanna McIntosh as the Woman in the film adaptation of Offspring. The character died in the novel but her performance impressed both Ketchum and director Andrew van den Houten and the script was rewritten with her surviving.

According to Lucky McKee, the film "started out with me pitching a sequel to the producer of the OFFSPRING film. I pitched it to Ketchum around the same time and we decided to write both the book and the screenplay together. It was all part of a wonderful collaborative run we had together for many years."

Both the novel and the script for the film were collaborated on at the same time by Ketchum and McKee. According to Ketchum, "Lucky and I both did the screenplay and the novel together. What basically happened was, we IM'd each other and got down the basic plot that we wanted. The characters that we wanted. The situations that we wanted. We got it into a structured form. While Lucky was doing the heavy lifting on the screenplay version, and I was editing that and sending it back and forth to him, we were also working on the prose version of it, and I was doing the heavy lifting on the prose."

== Reception ==
Author Adam Cesare reviewed the book with "Ketchum knows his way around a pen, and, looking at the evidence, McKee does as well. The prose in The Woman is a strong confident step above most of the genre. It's a short book, but that's because it's not bogged down by excess fat or padding. Every word counts and while every passage may not ring as lyrically, the book has more than its fair share of beauty (and purposeful, abject ugliness)."

Michael Wilson wrote "Whilst Jack's work is unquestionably gory, it is minimalist and always packs a philosophical message underneath the reams of innards and blood. Think of it, if you like, as fiction's equivalent to Martyrs... Whilst there are similarities and parallels between The Woman and The Girl Next Door, this is distinct enough to stand its ground as another essential Ketchum novel. It is an interesting exploration of the human psyche, our own endurance levels and confronts the question of what it is to be human."

== Sequels ==
Jack Ketchum and Lucky McKee wrote a follow-up novella called 'Cow' that takes place after the events of the novel. It was published in certain editions of 'The Woman' and later in the collection 'Gorilla in the Room'. McKee said it was written on as a request from the paperback publisher to make their edition of the book longer. McKee described the story with "Ketchum and I just kind of took the ball and played with it. THE COW is not something that I could ever see myself filming. It's a separate story. I went about as dark as I could possibly go with THE WOMAN, but god...I don't think I could do that."

Ketchum also wrote a short story called 'Endgame' which is currently only available in Dark Regions' 35th Anniversary Edition of 'Off Season' and functions as a conclusion for the character.
