= Spencer List =

American actor (born 1998)

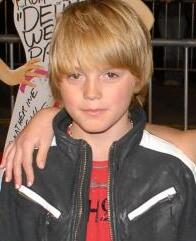
- List in 2008
- Born: Spencer W. List; April 6, 1998 (age 28); West Palm Beach, Florida, U.S.
- Occupation: Actor
- Years active: 2003–present
- Relatives: Peyton List (twin sister)

Spencer W. List (born April 6, 1998) is an American actor. List is best known from the Fox show Fringe. He has played Carter in The Fosters and its spin-off Good Trouble. He has also been on Law & Order: Special Victims Unit and Jack Ketchum's Offspring.

== Early life ==
List was born on April 6, 1998, to John and Suzanne List. He has one sister, his twin Peyton List, who is an actress, and a younger brother, Phoenix, who is an actor.

== Career ==
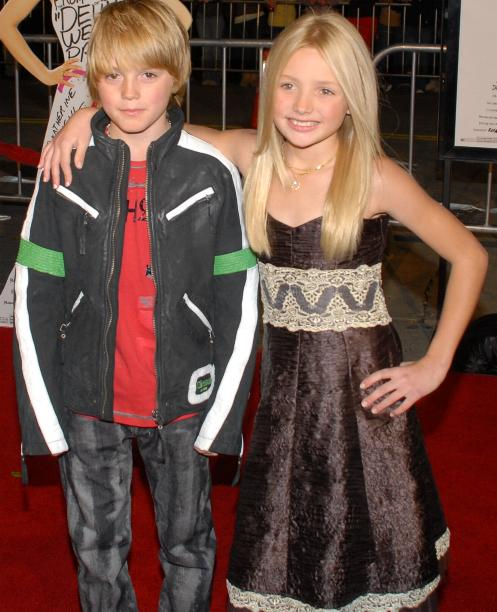
List with his twin sister, Peyton, at the 27 Dresses premiere in 2008

List began his professional acting career as a child actor in 2003, when he appeared in a guest role as Tate Walker in the crime drama series Law & Order: Special Victims Unit.

In 2004, List appeared in an uncredited role with his twin sister Peyton List in Spider-Man 2 as little children.

In 2006, List appeared in the comedy television film Haskett's Chance directed by Tim Blake Nelson, where he played the role as Owen Haskett.

In 2009, List appeared in the horror film Offspring directed by Andrew van den Houten, which is itself the sequel to Off Season.

In 2010, List was cast in the crime horror film Bereavement opposite Michael Biehn, Alexandra Daddario, Brett Rickaby and Nolan Gerard Funk.

List appeared in the films Bringing Up Bobby and The Orphan Killer, which premiere at the 2011 Cannes Film Festival on May 12, and received a limited release on September 28, 2012.

In 2014, List was cast to play the lead role of Oliver Nicholas in the drama film Night Has Settled alongside Pilar López de Ayala, Adriana Barraza, Eric Nelsen and Tommy Nelson, directed by Steve Clark, which was released on February 1, 2014. In the same year, List appeared in the horror films Foreclosure and Mockingbird, in which he played the role of Jacob Henry. List was cast in the television film A Wife's Nightmare directed by Vic Sarin and Vijay Sarin, where he played the role of AJ.

List appeared as Carter Hunter in the family drama series The Fosters and also Good Trouble.

In 2022, List was cast to play the role of Peter McAlister in the horror film She Came from the Woods opposite Cara Buono, Clare Foley, William Sadler and Michael Park, directed by Erik Bloomquist, which was premiered at FrightFest on August 27, 2022 and released on Tubi on June 10, 2023.

== Filmography ==
Film roles
Year	Film	Role	Notes
2004	The Veronica Show		
2004	Spider-Man 2	Little Boy	Uncredited, deleted scene
2006	Haskett's Chance	Owen Haskett	
2009	Offspring	Rabbit	
2010	Bereavement	Martin	
2011	Bringing Up Bobby	Bobby	
2011	The Orphan Killer	Young Marcus Miller	Also known as Sibling: Marcus Miller the Orphan Killer
2014	Night Has Settled	Oliver Nicholas	Originally titled Spaz
2014	A Wife's Nightmare	AJ	
2014	Foreclosure	Steven	
2014	Mockingbird	Jacob Henry	
2016	Hard Sell	Jamie	
2018	The Thinning: New World Order	Tyson	uncredited role
2022	Exploited	Tommy	
2022	She Came from the Woods	Pete McAlister	

Television roles
Year	Film	Role	Notes
2003	Law & Order: Special Victims Unit	Tate Walker	Episode: "Coerced"
2004	One Life to Live	Ace	
2006	Haskett's Chance	Owen Haskett	Television film
2007	Saturday Night Live	Boy	Episode: "LeBron James/Kanye West" (segment: "Angry Dog"); uncredited
2009	Wonder Pets!	Giraffe (voice)	Episode: "Job Well Done"
2009	Fringe	The Child	Episode: "Inner Child"
2011	CSI: Miami	Troy Faber	Episode: "A Few Dead Men"
2012	iCarly	Lurvin	Episode: "iBattle Chip"
2014	A Wife's Worst Nightmare	AJ	Television film (Lifetime)
2016	Bunk'd	Eric	Episode: "Luke's Back"
2018	The Fosters	Carter Hunter	3 episodes
2019–2021	Good Trouble	Carter Hunter	3 episodes
