= Darlin' (2019 film) =

- Film poster
- Directed by: Pollyanna McIntosh
- Written by: Pollyanna McIntosh
- Based on: Characters created by Jack Ketchum & Lucky McKee
- Produced by: Andrew van den Houten
- Starring: Lauryn Canny; Bryan Batt; Nora-Jane Noone; Cooper Andrews; Pollyanna McIntosh
- Cinematography: Halyna Hutchins
- Edited by: Julie Garces
- Music by: Ali Helnwein
- Production company: Hood River Entertainment
- Distributed by: Dark Sky Film; Capelight Pictures
- Release dates: March 9, 2019 (South by Southwest Film Festival); July 12, 2019 (United States)
- Running time: 100 minutes
- Country: United States
- Language: English

Darlin' is a 2019 American film written and directed by Pollyanna McIntosh, who describes it as "a social issue horror film". Besides McIntosh, the rest of the cast consists of Lauryn Canny, Bryan Batt, Nora-Jane Noone, and Cooper Andrews. It is the third standalone part of a trilogy that includes Offspring and the Lucky McKee film The Woman, in which McIntosh played the leading roles.

== Plot ==
At the end of the previous film, Darlin', Peggy, and Socket Cleek joined the feral woman to live in the wilderness. Years later, Peggy and Socket are gone while the now teenage Darlin' has developed a feral personality. She and the Woman are walking through the forest naked despite the wintry conditions. One day, at the insistence of the Woman, Darlin' arrives outside a hospital and accidentally gets struck by an ambulance. After being treated at the hospital, she is sent to a Catholic boarding school called St. Philomena's, where the staff and other students attempt to civilize her.

A nurse named Tony, who was the first to find and befriend her at the hospital, tries to look out for her, but is repeatedly turned away by the school for being gay. Though she has forgotten how to speak, she is renamed Darlin' after the name on her bracelet. She slowly regains her ability to speak, her hair is cut to mid-back length, and she befriends some of the other students, especially a trouble-making tomboy named Billy, but has trouble adjusting to modern life and is disturbed by the school's teachings about the Devil. A greedy bishop attempts to exploit her for fame and fortune.

Eventually, the Woman enters the city and kills everyone in her path to retrieve her adoptive daughter Darlin' while wearing a brown dress she obtained, stolen sunglasses and a jacket, though she befriends a group of homeless prostitutes. Tony cooperates with the Woman by telling her where Darlin' is and she spares his life.

The bishop is a pedophile who regularly preys on the girls, and had preyed on the school's Sister Jennifer when she was a child. He tries to seduce Darlin' only to discover she is pregnant. She reveals that her sister Peggy had died in childbirth after having a stillborn child, which made Socket run away. A few months ago, she and the Woman captured a skier and Darlin' had sex with him before the Woman killed him. The Woman made her go to civilization so that she could deliver the baby safely. However, due to the school's teachings and what happened to Peggy, Darlin' believes the baby inside her is the Devil and repeatedly pleads with God to save her.

When Darlin' is about to receive her First Communion, she attempts either suicide or to induce a miscarriage by drinking bleach, but all it does is make her sick. During the ceremony, Sister Jennifer plays a recording of the bishop confessing his crimes which makes several people walk out in disgust. Darlin' bites a chunk out of his hand, but suddenly goes into labor. The Woman and the homeless prostitutes storm the church and the Woman kills the bishop, impaling him with a flagpole. The prostitutes, horrified by the Woman's brutality, flee the church.

Tony, his boyfriend Robert, Sister Jennifer, and Billy help deliver Darlin's child, a girl. Darlin' tells the Woman to take the baby far away. As sirens approach, Tony, Robert, Sister Jennifer, and Billy tend to Darlin', while the Woman takes the baby, puts it in a sling and walks out.

== Cast ==
- Lauryn Canny as Darlin' Cleek, a girl who was raised by the Woman.
  - Mackenzie Bateman as younger Darlin'. She was previously portrayed by Shyla Molhusen in the last film.
- Bryan Batt as The Bishop, an unnamed greedy bishop who is secretly a pedophile.
- Nora-Jane Noone as Sister Jennifer, a nun at St. Philomina's Catholic School that takes care of Darlin'.
- Cooper Andrews as Nurse Tony, a gay nurse who befriends Darlin'
- Pollyanna McIntosh as The Woman, a feral cannibal who took in Darlin'.
- John McConnell as Dr. Grant, a doctor at the hospital that Darlin' arrived at.
- Geraldine Singer as Sister Grace, a nun at St. Philomina's Catholic School.
- Maddie Nichols as Billy, a trouble-making tomboy who befriends Darlin.
- Mackenzie Graham as Bug
- Jeff Pope as Clown
- Eugenie Bondurant as Mona
- Sabrina Gennarino as Charity
- Thomas Francis Murphy as The Cardinal
- Damon Lipari as Robert, the boyfriend of Tony.

Lauren Ashley Carter and Alexa Marcigliano reprise their roles as Peggy and Socket Cleek from The Woman, respectively where they appear in flashbacks.

== Reception ==
On the review aggregator website Rotten Tomatoes, the film holds an approval rating of 69% based on 29 reviews and a weighted average rating of 3.1 out of 5. On Metacritic, it was given a score of 49 out of 100 based on 5 critics, indicating "mixed or average" reviews. Noel Murray of the Los Angeles Times described Darlin' as "equal parts disgusting and grandiose — and kind of awesome, for fans of bizarre, punky horror."
