= Lauryn Canny =

Irish actress

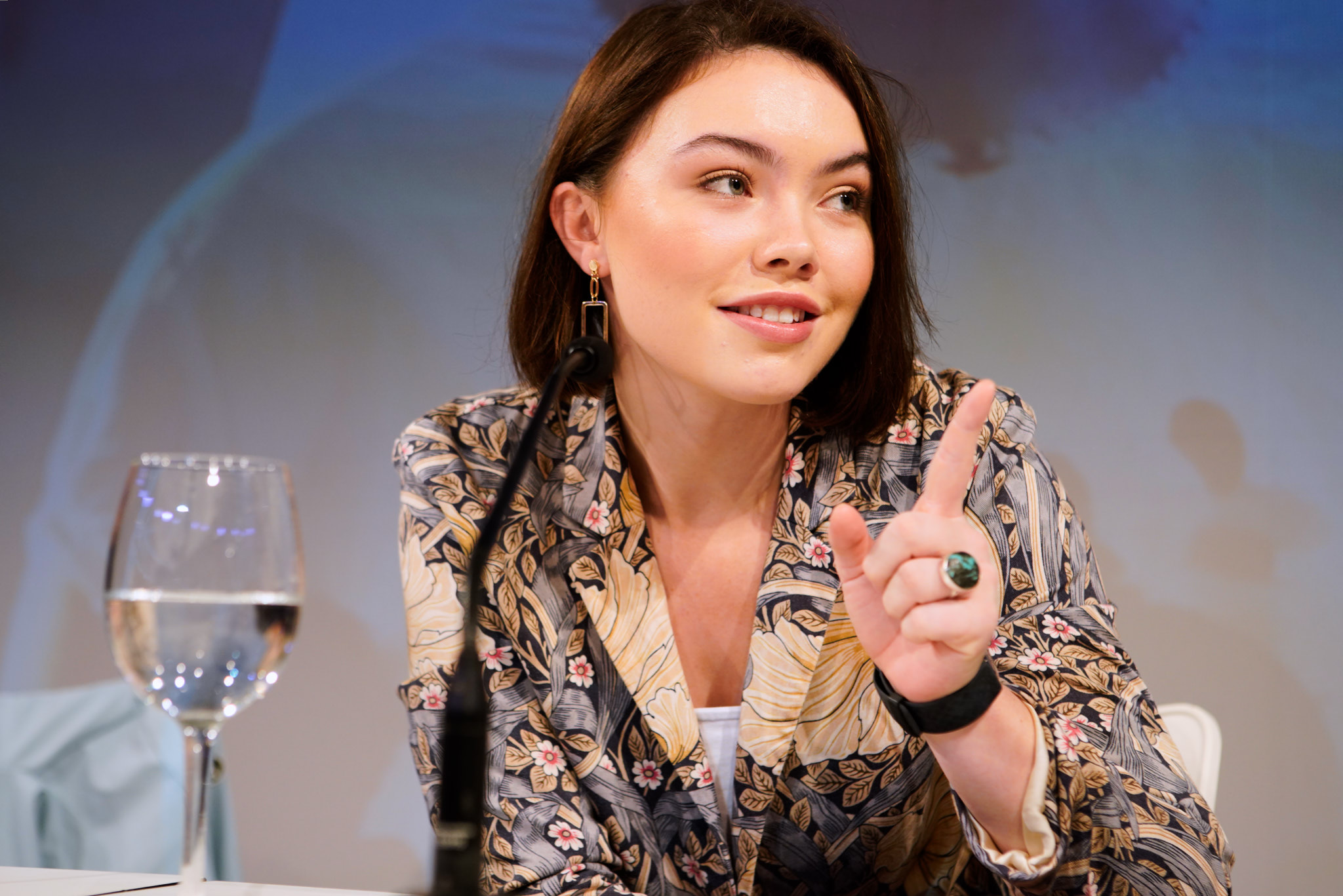
- Canny in 2019
- Born: 1998 (age 26–27); Dublin, Ireland
- Years active: 2013–present

Lauryn Canny (born 1998) is an Irish actress. On television, she starred as the titular role of the RTÉ One crime drama Amber (2014). Her films include Darlin' (2019).

== Early life and education ==
Canny was born in Dublin, though she has family from County Clare, specifically Corofin and Newmarket-on-Fergus. She has two younger sisters. Canny attended St Mac Dara's Community College in Templeogue. She also participated in the Gaiety School of Acting's summer programme.

== Career ==
In 2019, Canny played the lead, a feral teenager, in Pollyanna McIntosh's Darlin'. In 2020, she played Teresa, in two episodes of BBC One's Normal People, and Sarah in Dating Amber.

In 2023, she played a drug mule in Wrapped, a one-off drama for RTÉ Player.

== Filmography ==
=== Film ===
Year	Title	Role	Notes
2013	A Thousand Times Good Night	Stephanie	
2014	Poison Pen	Sally	
2015	The von Trapp Family: A Life of Music	Kirsty	
2016	Wifey Redux	Ellie Prendergast	Short film
2018	Salt Water	Rachel Mirada	
2019	Darlin'	Darlin' Cleek	
2019	Limbo	Angela	
2020	Dating Amber	Sarah	

=== Television ===
Year	Title	Role	Notes
2014	Amber	Amber Bailey	Lead role
2020	Normal People	Teresa	
2023	Wrapped		Television film
