= All Saints (film) =

- Theatrical release poster
- Directed by: Steve Gomer
- Written by: Steve Armour
- Produced by: Marc Bienstock; Martha Chang; Steve Gomer
- Starring: John Corbett; Cara Buono; Myles Moore; Nelson Lee; Barry Corbin; David Keith; Angela Fox; Chonda Pierce; Gregory Alan Williams
- Cinematography: Eduardo Enrique Mayen
- Edited by: Richard Halsey
- Production companies: Affirm Films; Provident Films; Autumn Pictures
- Distributed by: Sony Pictures Releasing
- Release date: August 25, 2017
- Running time: 108 minutes
- Country: United States
- Language: English
- Budget: $2 million
- Box office: $5.9 million

All Saints is a 2017 American Christian drama film directed by Steve Gomer and written by Steve Armour. The film stars John Corbett, Cara Buono, Myles Moore, Nelson Lee, Barry Corbin, David Keith, Angela Fox, Chonda Pierce and Gregory Alan Williams, and follows a small-town Tennessee preacher who attempts to save his struggling church. It was released on August 25, 2017, by Affirm Films and Provident Films.

== Premise ==
Based on a true story, a salesman-turned-pastor Michael Spurlock of a tiny Episcopal (Anglican) church in Smyrna, Tennessee is ordered to shut it down. He attempts to save the church, as well as a group of refugees from Karen State, Myanmar, in Southeast Asia.

== Cast ==
- John Corbett as Michael Spurlock, a salesman-turned-pastor
- Cara Buono as Aimee Spurlock, Michael's wife
- Myles Moore as Atticus Spurlock, Michael and Aimee's son
- Nelson Lee as Ye Win
- Barry Corbin as Forrest
- David Keith as Boyd
- Angela Fox as Mary-O
- Chonda Pierce as Ruth
- Gregory Alan Williams as Bishop Thompson

== Production ==
Filming began in September 2016 and continued through October, shooting in Nashville and Smyrna, Tennessee.

== Reception ==
=== Box office ===
In North America, All Saints was released on August 25, 2017, alongside Birth of the Dragon and Leap!, and was projected to gross around $3–4 million from 846 theaters in its opening weekend. It made $150,000 on its first day and $1.6 million over the weekend, finishing 15th at the box office. The film's low opening was attributed to Hurricane Harvey hitting Texas and surrounding areas–typically faith-based regions–causing theaters to close, as well the boxing match between Floyd Mayweather and Conor McGregor on the Saturday. The combined weekend box office was the lowest-grossing since September 2001.

=== Critical response ===
On the review aggregator website Rotten Tomatoes, 95% of 19 critics' reviews are positive. Metacritic, which uses a weighted average, assigned the film a score of 63 out of 100, based on 7 critics, indicating "generally favorable" reviews. Audiences polled by CinemaScore gave the film an average grade of "A−" on an A+ to F scale, while PostTrak reported filmgoers gave it an 85% overall positive score.

Frank Scheck of The Hollywood Reporter gave the film a positive review, writing: "By avoiding excessive proselytizing and instead simply and effectively relating its moving tale, All Saints proves stirring in a way many of its cinematic brethren do not."
