= World Horror Convention Grand Master Award =

The World Horror Convention Grand Master Award is a yearly distinction given to an author who has contributed greatly to the field of horror literature. Nominees must be alive at the time of voting and can not have previously won the award. The award is given at the annual World Horror Convention.

After 2016, there were no World Horror Conventions organized, and no World Horror Convention Grand Master Awards were given since. The Bram Stoker Awards are still presented annually to horror writers by the Horror Writers Association.

== Past recipients ==
Recipients of the award include:

- Robert Bloch – 1991
- Stephen King – 1992
- Richard Matheson – 1993
- Anne Rice – 1994
- Clive Barker – 1995
- Dean Koontz – 1996
- Peter Straub – 1997
- Brian Lumley – 1998
- Ramsey Campbell – 1999
- Harlan Ellison – 2000
- Ray Bradbury – 2001
- Charles L. Grant – 2002
- Chelsea Quinn Yarbro – 2003
- Jack Williamson – 2004
- F. Paul Wilson – 2005
- Ray Garton – 2006
- Joe R. Lansdale – 2007
- Robert McCammon – 2008
- Tanith Lee – 2009
- James Herbert – 2010
- Jack Ketchum – 2011
- T. E. D. Klein – 2012
- Dan Simmons – 2013
- Brian Keene – 2014
- William F. Nolan – 2015
- Michael R. Collings – 2016
