= Offspring (2009 film) =

- Directed by: Andrew van den Houten
- Written by: Jack Ketchum
- Based on: Offspring by Jack Ketchum
- Produced by: Andrew van den Houten; Robert Tonino
- Starring: Pollyanna McIntosh; Art Hindle; Amy Hargreaves; Ahna Tessler
- Cinematography: William M. Miller
- Music by: Ryan Shore
- Production company: Modernciné
- Distributed by: Ghost House Underground
- Release date: 2009
- Running time: 79 min
- Country: United States
- Language: English

Offspring is a 2009 horror film directed by Andrew van den Houten. The film centers on survivors of a feral flesh-eating tribe who abduct locals. It is based on the novel of the same name by Jack Ketchum, which is itself the sequel to Off Season. The cannibals in this film speak a language of grunts which is subtitled for the viewer. This did not happen in the sequel unless subtitles are turned on, as it only contains one of them.

== Cast ==
- Pollyanna McIntosh as The Woman
- Art Hindle as George Chandler
- Ahna Tessler as Amy Halbard
- Amy Hargreaves as Claire Carey
- Andrew Elvis Miller as David Halbard
- Tommy Nelson as Luke
- Holter Graham as Vic Manetti
- Taylor John Piedmonte as Miles Harrison
- Spencer List as Rabbit
- Erick Kastel as Stephen Carey
- Stephen Grey as First Stolen
- Leigh Feldpausch as Second Stolen

== Sequels ==
Pollyanna McIntosh reprises her role in the sequel, The Woman. Before he began to direct the film, a friend of van den Houten's specifically requested that he keep The Woman alive so she could appear in a sequel.

In 2019, McIntosh wrote and directed a standalone sequel to The Woman titled Darlin'.
