= Joseph Saba (composer) =

American composer and entrepreneur (born 1971)

Joe Saba
- Born: Joseph Maron Saba; January 18, 1971 (age 55); Wilkes-Barre, Pennsylvania
- Education: Columbia University
- Occupation: Composer
- Children: 2

Joseph Saba is an American composer, multi-instrumentalist and producer. He is best known as a co-founder, along with Stewart Winter, of the production music library VideoHelper and a founding member of the Production Music Association (PMA). Saba's compositions have won seven Mark Awards and two Music+Sound Awards for excellence in production music.

== Early life and education ==
Saba was born in Wilkes-Barre, Pennsylvania. He graduated from Columbia University.

== Career ==
After graduating from Columbia University in 1993, Saba briefly played keyboards for the band Fabulon and appeared on MTV's 120 Minutes. He later composed the original score for Two Ninas, starring Amanda Peet and Ron Livingston.

=== VideoHelper ===
In 1995, he and Stewart Winter co-founded VideoHelper, launching it from a bootlegger's warehouse in New York City. The company produces and licenses original music and sound design for use in television, film, advertising, trailers, and digital media. VideoHelper is the creator of MODULES, a sound design library introduced in 2007 that combines music composition with sound design elements such as percussive hits, risers, and drones, developed for use in film trailers and broadcast editorial. The company has won multiple industry awards and has composed theme music for television programs including Nightline and 20/20 on ABC, The Soup on E!, and The Suze Orman Show on CNBC.

=== Production Music Association ===
In 1997, Saba was part of a group of eight composers and publishers who joined to advocate on behalf of the production music community, leading to the foundation of the Production Music Association (PMA). As of 2026, the PMA's membership has grown to over 800 music publishers, composers, and production music technology service members.

Serving as vice chairman in 2017, Saba shared the results of a proprietary PMA study at the Production Music Conference that showed production music had become a $1 billion global industry.

== Personal life ==
Saba is married with two children and a dog. He lives in Brooklyn.
