= VideoHelper =

VideoHelper is an American production music library founded in 1995 by composers Joseph Saba and Stewart Winter, headquartered in New York City. The company produces and licenses original music and sound design for use in television, film, advertising, trailers, and digital media. VideoHelper is the creator of MODULES, a sound design library introduced in 2007 that combines music composition with sound design elements such as percussive hits, risers, and drones, developed for use in film trailers and broadcast editorial.

The company has won multiple industry awards and has composed theme music for television programs including Nightline and 20/20 on ABC, The Soup on E!, and The Suze Orman Show on CNBC.

== History ==
VideoHelper was founded in New York City in 1995 by composers Joseph Saba and Stewart Winter. Winter had previously worked as an associate TV promos producer at ABC News and had done sound design work for Sesame Street. Frustrated with the available library music options, he conceived the idea of creating production music that was easier to edit and more direct in its storytelling. He subsequently met Saba and the two founded VideoHelper, initially operating out of a warehouse space in Manhattan. The company later established offices near Union Square.

Saba had previously worked as a keyboardist for the EMI/Chrysalis band Fabulon before moving into composition and music licensing. In 1997, he was among the founding members of the Production Music Association, a trade organization representing production music libraries and composers, and later served as vice chairman of the organization.

Winter's son is the Geese frontman and solo recording artist Cameron Winter.

== Catalog ==
VideoHelper produces original music and sound design libraries for use in television, film marketing, advertising, and broadcast media. The company distributes its catalog for licensing through multiple aggregation platforms, publishing music under four primary labels: VideoHelper, MODULES, Aspect, and Carbon. They employ a core team of full-time staff composers, supplemented by commissioned contributors.

The MODULES series consists of sound design collections developed for use in film trailers and broadcast promotions. The series combines musical composition with sound design elements including percussive hits, risers, drones, and textural layers, and has been described as a "go-to choice for music supervisors overseeing film trailers, TV promos, marketing, and multimedia projects."

== Television and media usage ==
=== Broadcast news ===
VideoHelper composed the theme music for Nightline on ABC News beginning in 2005, following the program's redesign after the departure of longtime anchor Ted Koppel. In 2025, ABC News reintroduced a version of the VideoHelper theme as part of a redesign marking the program's 45th anniversary.

VideoHelper music has also appeared on Good Morning America, 20/20, and Dateline.

Their track "Elegant Murder" has been used as the theme for the NBC News Now streaming program Hallie Jackson NOW since its launch in 2021.

"None More Black" is the theme for The 11th Hour with Brian Williams and its subsequent hosts Stephanie Ruhle and Ali Velshi.

=== Entertainment television ===
VideoHelper composed theme music for the E! talk show The Soup and the CNBC program The Suze Orman Show.

Music written by co-founders Joseph Saba and Stewart Winter is used as the opening theme for the comedy web series On Cinema at the Cinema, created by Tim Heidecker and Gregg Turkington.

=== Sports ===
VideoHelper music has been used in programming for the NFL, the Olympics on NBC, and in Super Bowl commercials. Several WWE performers have used VideoHelper tracks by Saba and Winter as their entrance music, including King Booker and Curt Hawkins.

=== Film Trailers ===
VideoHelper sound design has been used in trailers for the theatrical releases of such films as Batman Begins, The Da Vinci Code, The Dark Knight, Avatar, Drag Me to Hell, Shutter Island, and Wreck-It Ralph.

== Awards ==
The Production Music Association's Mark Awards have honored VideoHelper across categories including Best Use of Production Music, Best Orchestral Track, and Best Wildcard Track. Recognized composers include Joseph Saba, Stewart Winter, Saul Guanipa, William Werwath, and Florian Seraul.

The UK Production Music Awards have awarded VideoHelper Best Wildcard Production Music Track, Best Ambient/Minimalist Track, Best Indie/Alternative Track, and Best Trailer Track.

== See also ==
- Production music
- Joseph Saba (composer)
- Cameron Winter
