= Cara Buono =

American actress (born 1971)

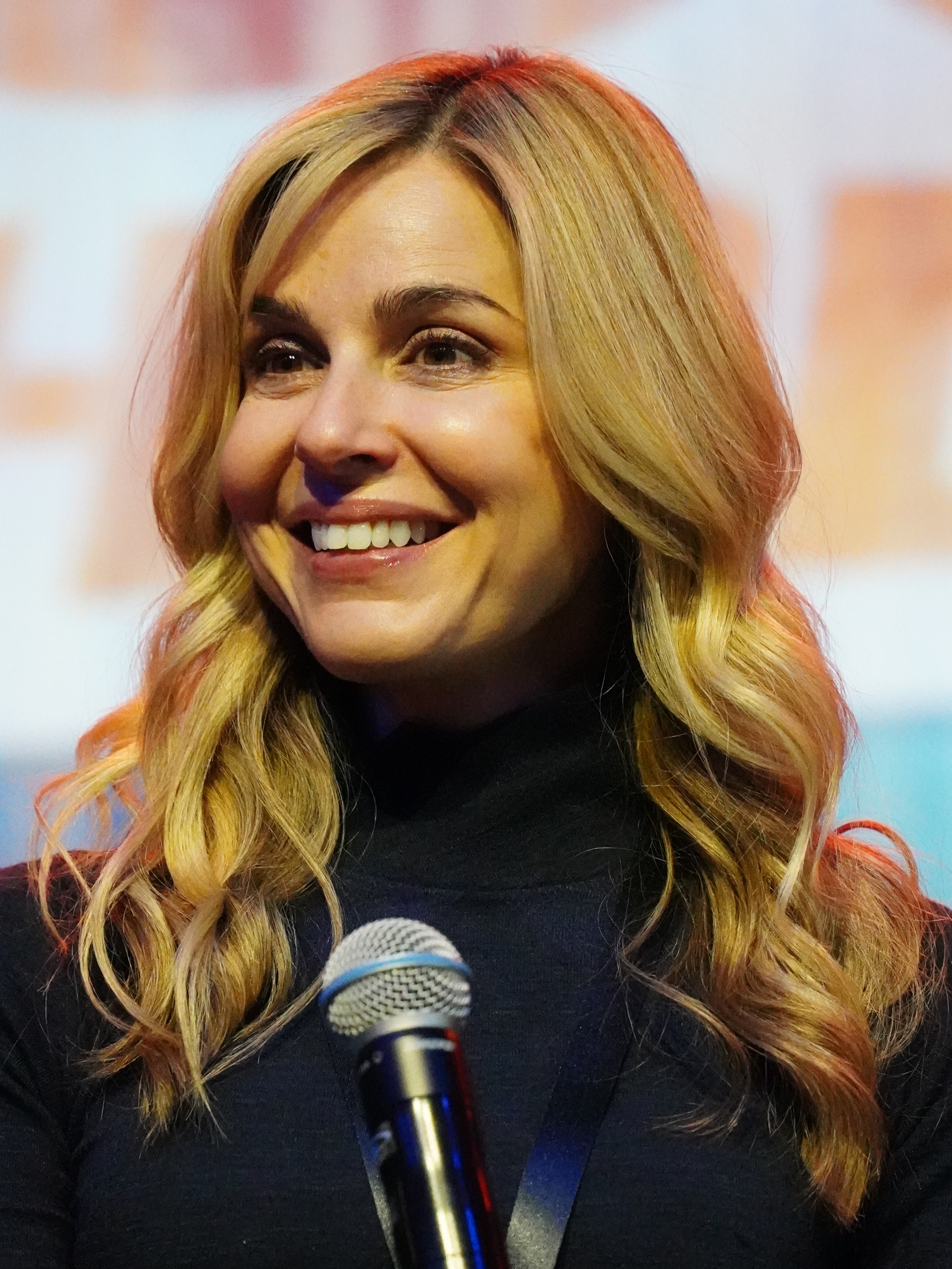
- Buono in 2026
- Born: March 1, 1971 (age 55); New York City, U.S.
- Education: Columbia University
- Occupation: Actress
- Years active: 1989–present
- Spouse: Peter Thum
- Children: 1

Cara Buono (born March 1, 1971) is an American actress. She made her film debut in Gladiator (1992) and received recognition for her roles in various television shows including CBS Schoolbreak Special (1991), Law & Order (1996–2024), Mad Men (2010), and starred as Karen Wheeler in the Netflix series Stranger Things (2016–2025). Her roles earned her nominations for both a Primetime Emmy Award for Outstanding Guest Actress in a Drama Series and a Daytime Emmy Award for Outstanding Performer in Children's Programming.

On film, Buono has appeared in a number of projects since her 1992 debut, with her most notable credits including Hulk (2003), in which she portrayed Edith Banner, Let Me In (2010), A Good Marriage (2014), Paper Towns (2015), All Saints (2017), Monsters and Men (2018), and She Came from the Woods (2022).

== Early life and education ==
Buono was born to Rosemary (née Desiderioscioli; 1930–2023) and Anthony Buono (1927–2021) and raised in the Bronx, a borough of New York City, in a blue-collar family of Italian descent. She has two brothers and a sister.

She attended Fiorello H. LaGuardia High School, a specialized high school in New York City that focuses on music, art, and the performing arts, and graduated from Columbia University with a double major in English and political science, which she completed in three years. She made her acting debut in Harvey Fierstein's play Spookhouse at the age of 12.

== Career ==
Buono continued stage work both on Broadway and Off Broadway, and started her film career opposite Ethan Hawke and Jeremy Irons in Waterland (1992). Much of her work has been in indie films such as Chutney Popcorn (1999), Happy Accidents (2000), Next Stop Wonderland (1998) and Two Ninas (1999), which she co-produced. In 1999, she had a small role as a young Gerry Cummins in the TV movie, Deep in My Heart (1999).

She starred in the final season of the NBC drama Third Watch (1999) as paramedic Grace Foster, and Ang Lee's feature film of Marvel Comics' Hulk in 2003 as the mother of the title character's alter ego, Bruce Banner.

She also appeared as Kelli, the wife of Christopher Moltisanti (Michael Imperioli), in the two-part final season of the HBO drama series The Sopranos, which aired in 2006 and 2007. She appeared as Dr. Faye Miller in the fourth season of the AMC drama series Mad Men, for which she received an Emmy nomination for Outstanding Guest Actress in a Drama Series in 2011.

== Personal life ==
Buono lives in New York City's Greenwich Village with her husband Peter Thum, founder of Ethos Water, and their daughter.

== Filmography ==
=== Film ===
Year	Title	Role	Notes	Ref.
1992	Gladiator	Dawn		
1992	Waterland	Judy Dobson		
1994	The Cowboy Way	Teresa Salazar		
1995	Killer: A Journal of Murder	Esther Lesser		
1995	Kicking and Screaming	Kate		
1997	Made Men	Toni-Ann Antonelli		
1998	Next Stop Wonderland	Julie		
1998	River Red	Rachel		
1999	Man of the Century	Virginia Clemens		
1999	Two Ninas	Nina Cohen		
1999	Chutney Popcorn	Janis		
2000	Happy Accidents	Bette		
2000	Takedown	Christina Painter		
2000	Attention Shoppers	Claire Suarez		
2003	Hulk	Edith Banner		
2004	From Other Worlds	Joanne Schwartzbaum		
2006	Artie Lange's Beer League	Linda Salvo		
2007	Cthulhu	Dannie Marsh		
2010	Betrayed	Amy Waite	Short film	
2010	Stuff	Madeline	Short film	
2010	Let Me In	Owen's mother		
2012	The Discoverers	Nell		
2014	A Good Marriage	Betty Pike		
2015	Paper Towns	Connie Jacobsen		
2015	Emily & Tim	Emily Hanratty	Segment: "Betrayal"	
2016	Half the Perfect World	Sonia		
2017	All Saints	Aimee Spurlock		
2018	Monsters and Men	Stacey		
2022	She Came from the Woods	Heather McCalister		
2024	Queen of the Ring	Bertha		
2024	In Fidelity	Holly Ayker		
2025	V13	Ida		
2025	Things Like This	Margie Kitlin		
2026	The Debut		Completed	

=== Television ===
Year	Title	Role	Notes	Ref.
1989	Dream Street	Joann	2 episodes	
1991	CBS Schoolbreak Special	Abby Morris	Episode: "Abby, My Love"; Nominated -- Daytime Emmy Award for Outstanding Performer in a Children's Special	
1992	I'll Fly Away	Diane	3 episodes	
1993	Tribeca	Rose Polito	Episode: "The Hopeless Romantic"	
1993	Victim of Love: The Shannon Mohr Story	Tracey Lien	Television film	
1995	The Single Guy	Christie	Episode: "Tennis"	
1996	New York Undercover	Connie	Episode: "A Time to Kill"	
1996	Law & Order	Shelly Taggert	Episode: "Girlfriends"	
1998	Law & Order	Alice Simonelli	Episode: "Punk"	
1999	Deep in My Heart	Young Gerry Cummins	Television film	
2001	Family Law	Carly Hanson	Episode: "Intentions"	
2002	Law & Order: Criminal Intent	Charlotte Fielding	Episode: "Phantom"	
2002	CSI: Crime Scene Investigation	Tracy Logan	Episode: "Chasing the Bus"	
2003	Miss Match	Michelle Schiff	Episode: "The Love Bandit"	
2004	Six Months to Live	Alice	Episode: "1.1"	
2004–2005	Third Watch	Grace Foster	22 episodes	
2006–2007	The Sopranos	Kelli Moltisanti	7 episodes	
2007	Law & Order	Attorney Shannon	Episode: "Melting Pot"	
2007	Queens Supreme	Bettina Martinelli	Episode: "That Voodoo That You Do"	
2007	The Dead Zone	Sheriff Anna Turner	6 episodes	
2008	Law & Order: Special Victims Unit	Rachel Zelinsky	Episode: "Unorthodox"	
2008	The Unquiet	Julie Bishop	Television film	
2009	ER	Lisa Salamunovich	Episode: "And in the End..."	
2009	NCIS	Navy Cdr. Sarah Resnik	Episode: "Power Down"	
2010	Mad Men	Faye Miller	10 episodes Nominated -- Primetime Emmy Award for Outstanding Guest Actress in a Drama Series; Nominated -- Screen Actors Guild Award for Outstanding Performance by an Ensemble in a Drama Series	
2011	Brothers & Sisters	Rose	3 episodes	
2011	Hawaii Five-0	Agent Allison Marsh	Episode: "Ho'opa'i"	
2011	A Gifted Man	Carol Gordan	Episode: "In Case of Discomfort"	
2012	Drew Peterson: Untouchable	Kathleen Savio	Television film	
2013	Castle	Siobhan O'Doul	Episode: "The Wild Rover"	
2013	The Good Wife	Charlene Peterson	Episode: "A More Perfect Union"	
2014	The Carrie Diaries	Penny	Episode: "Hungry Like the Wolf"	
2014	Elementary	Sarah Cushing	Episode: "Ears to You"	
2014–2015	Person of Interest	Martine Rousseau	8 episodes	
2015	The Mysteries of Laura	Julia Davis	Episode: "The Mystery of the Taken Boy"	
2016–2025	Stranger Things	Karen Wheeler	Main role Screen Actors Guild Award for Outstanding Performance by an Ensemble in a Drama Series (2016); Nominated -- Screen Actors Guild Award for Outstanding Performance by an Ensemble in a Drama Series (2017, 2019)	
2017	The Blacklist: Redemption	Anna Copeland	Episode: "Leland Bray"	
2017	Bull	Amaya Andrews	Episode: "The Illusion of Control"	
2018	The Bad Seed	Angela Grossman	Television film	
2018	The Romanoffs	Debbie Newman	Episode: "Bright and High Circle"	
2019–2021	Supergirl	Gamemnae	Recurring role; 9 episodes	
2019	God Friended Me	Karen	Episode: "Return to Sender"	
2022	The Girl from Plainville	Gail Carter	8 episodes	
2023	The Girl Who Escaped: The Kara Robinson Story	Debra Robinson	Television film	
2024	Law & Order	Lisa Dumont	Episode: "Time Will Tell"	

=== Video games ===
Year	Title	Voice role	Notes	Ref.
2002	Mafia	Sarah Angelo		
