= The Woman (2011 film) =

- Theatrical release poster
- Directed by: Lucky McKee
- Written by: Jack Ketchum; Lucky McKee
- Based on: The Woman by Jack Ketchum; Lucky McKee
- Produced by: Robert Tonino; Andrew van den Houten
- Starring: Pollyanna McIntosh; Angela Bettis; Sean Bridgers; Lauren Ashley Carter; Carlee Baker; Alexa Marcigliano; Zach Rand; Shyla Molhusen
- Cinematography: Alex Vendler
- Edited by: Zach Passero
- Music by: Sean Spillane
- Production company: Modernciné
- Distributed by: The Collective; Bloody Disgusting; Salient Media
- Release date: January 23, 2011; (US)
- Running time: 101 minutes
- Country: United States
- Language: English

The Woman is a 2011 American horror film directed by horror filmmaker Lucky McKee, adapted by McKee and Jack Ketchum from McKee and Ketchum's novel of the same name. It is a sequel to the 2009 film Offspring. The film stars Pollyanna McIntosh, Angela Bettis, Sean Bridgers, Lauren Ashley Carter, Carlee Baker, and Alexa Marcigliano, and introduces Zach Rand and Shyla Molhusen.

The film was released as part of the Bloody Disgusting Selects line.

In 2019, McIntosh wrote and directed a sequel titled Darlin'.

== Plot ==
After the events of the previous film, an unidentified feral woman is the last remaining member of a cannibalistic tribe that has roamed the Northeast coast for decades.

Chris Cleek is a mentally deranged and misogynistic country lawyer, who lives with his wife Belle, their two daughters Peggy and Darlin', and their son, Brian. While out hunting, Chris sees the woman, who is bathing and fishing on a creek. The next day, Chris returns with a net in an effort to capture her. Once captured, Chris returns home with her and restrains her in a cellar, then directs his family to participate in "civilizing" her. Over the following days, Chris and his son Brian are revealed to be evil, sadistic, extremely dysfunctional and completely deranged, with a sexual fetish for torture and humiliation. Chris's first attempt to approach the woman results in her biting off and eating his ring finger. Chris orchestrates a violent series of civilizing measures toward the woman, to satisfy his fetish.

Chris bathes the woman with boiling water and a high-pressure power washer, causing her extreme pain and Chris to laugh maniacally. She is afterward clothed in a dress Belle sewed. Later that night, Chris rapes the woman while Brian secretly observes through a hole. The next day, Brian violates the woman with a pair of pliers but is caught by Peggy.

After a series of verbal and physical abuse conducted by both Chris and Brian towards the woman and the family, Belle announces her intention to leave Chris and take Peggy and Darlin. In response, Chris knocks Belle unconscious.

Peggy's geometry teacher Ms. Genevieve Raton visits the Cleek residence with the suspicion that Peggy might be pregnant. Chris angrily assumes that Ms. Raton is accusing him of rape and incest, then proceeds to knock her unconscious in response. Chris and Brian tie her up and take her to the barn where he keeps the family dogs. Peggy tries to intervene but becomes a victim of Chris' vicious verbal assault. In the barn, Ms. Raton is attacked by an eyeless girl named "Socket", the Cleeks' secret third daughter who behaves like the dogs. Socket kills and consumes Ms. Raton, as Chris and Brian watch.

Peggy releases the imprisoned woman from the cellar. Belle, having regained consciousness, is attacked and killed by the woman. The woman then proceeds to kill Brian with a mower blade. Chris tries to shoot the woman but is overpowered, the woman then tears his heart out, and consumes it. Afterward, the woman makes her way to the Cleeks' house where she places her hand on Peggy's belly, confirming that Peggy is pregnant. The woman then leaves with Darlin' and Socket, making their way to the woods. Peggy watches as they leave and she slowly starts following at a distance.

== Cast ==
- Pollyanna McIntosh as the Woman, the survivor of a tribe of cannibals.
- Sean Bridgers as Chris Cleek, a mentally ill and completely deranged country lawyer with an extreme sadism fetish.
- Angela Bettis as Belle Cleek, the wife of Chris Cleek.
- Lauren Ashley Carter as Peggy Cleek, the oldest daughter of Chris Cleek and Belle Cleek.
- Carlee Baker as Ms. Raton, the teacher of Peggy Cleek.
- Alexa Marcigliano as Socket Cleek, an eyeless girl, daughter of Chris Cleek and Belle Cleek.
- Zach Rand as Brian Cleek, the sadistic son of Chris Cleek and Belle Cleek, who has inherited his father's fetish.
- Shyla Molhusen as Darlin' Cleek, the youngest daughter of Chris Cleek and Belle Cleek.

== Reception ==
Critical reception for The Woman has been positive. As of March 2021, the film holds a 73% approval rating on Rotten Tomatoes, based on 51 reviews with an average rating of 6.40 out of 10. The website's critics consensus reads: "Strange, audacious, and aggressive, The Woman is an uneven horror flick that game viewers with a wildly bloody finale." Metacritic, which uses a weighted average, assigned the film a score of 58 out of 100, based on 9 critics, indicating "mixed or average" reviews.

=== Awards and nominations ===
- Octopus d’Or at the Strasbourg European Fantastic Film Festival, for the best international feature film
- Audience Award for the best international feature film at the Strasbourg European Fantastic Film Festival
- The Siren; International Award at the Lund Fantastic Film Festival

== Sequel ==
In 2019, a standalone sequel called Darlin' was released which is also Pollyanna McIntosh's directing debut as it tells about a now-feral Darlin' getting taken in by a Catholic boarding school as part of the Woman's secret plans.
