= The Prodigies (film) =

- French theatrical release poster
- Directed by: Antoine Charreyron
- Screenplay by: Alexandre de La Patellière; Matthieu Delaporte
- Based on: La Nuit des enfants rois by Bernard Lenteric
- Produced by: Jim Burton; Olivier Delbosc; Aton Soumache; Alexis Vonarb
- Starring: Jeffrey Evan Thomas; Lauren Ashley Carter; Moon Dailly
- Edited by: Sébastien Prangère; Vincent Tabaillon; Benjamin Weill
- Music by: Klaus Badelt
- Production companies: Onyx Films; Studio 37; Fidelite Films; DQ Entertainment; LuxAnimation; Norman Studios
- Distributed by: Warner Bros. Pictures (France); Kinepolis Film Distribution (Belgium)
- Release dates: May 2011 (Cannes); 25 May 2011 (Belgium); 8 June 2011 (France)
- Running time: 87 minutes
- Countries: France; Belgium; Luxembourg
- Languages: French; English; German
- Budget: $31.6 million
- Box office: $1.3 million

The Prodigies is a 2011 animated science fiction action thriller film based on La Nuit des enfants rois, a novel written by French writer Bernard Lenteric.

Released theatrically on 8 June 2011, the film received generally negative reviews from critics, with most critics and audiences making comparisons between The Prodigies and two other films, Village of the Damned and Law Abiding Citizen. It was a box office bomb, grossing only $1 million against a budget of $31 million.

== Plot ==
Ten-year-old Jimbo Farrar is a gifted child who suffers abuse at the hands of his parents. One day, in a fit of anger, Jimbo unintentionally uses his supernatural abilities, resulting in his mother's death and his father's suicide. Jimbo is then sent to a mental hospital, where he is later taken under the wing of billionaire Charles Killian, who helps him control his powers.

Twenty years later, Jimbo becomes a renowned researcher at the Killian Foundation for Gifted Children. He creates an online game called "The Game" to identify other individuals with supernatural abilities. However, when five unrelated teenagers hack his computer and discover his plans, Jimbo shuts down the game. To his surprise, he receives a mysterious message asking, "Where Are You?" Determined to find the teenagers, he sets out on a quest.

Meanwhile, Charles Killian dies, and the foundation falls into the hands of Melanie, his lesbian daughter, and Jenkins, her second-in-command. They plan to end Jimbo's game and focus on a TV show instead. To save the game and locate more gifted individuals, Jimbo proposes the idea of a televised competition called American Genius. Five hand-picked teenagers, Gil, Liza, Lee, Harry, and Sammy, are chosen as participants due to their extraordinary abilities.

However, tragedy strikes when Liza is assaulted and raped by thugs while the teenagers are gathered in Central Park. Jimbo arrives too late to prevent the attack, but the pain Liza experiences is telepathically extended to the others, and they use their abilities to defeat the assailants. Liza falls into a coma, and Jimbo discovers that Melanie plans to cover up the crime to protect the TV show.

Enraged, Jimbo confronts Melanie and loses control of his powers, leading to his dismissal from the Killian Foundation. Determined to protect the remaining teenagers, he locks himself in his office. In the meantime, the teenagers infiltrate the foundation's archives and find video recordings of Jimbo discussing his isolation and plans to bring gifted individuals together for revenge.

Inspired by Jimbo's words, Gil, Sammy, Lee, and Harry decide to avenge themselves and kill Liza's attackers, as well as the officer who covered up the crime and his wife. Jimbo is alarmed by their actions, and when he tries to reason with them, they turn against him. They order him to kill Jenkins, but Jimbo refuses, leading to a brutal attack that culminates in Jenkins' death and Jimbo being framed for the murder.

Jimbo attempts to explain the truth about their powers to the police, but he starts hallucinating and is unable to convince them. He is sent to prison, while Gil, Harry, Lee, and Sammy plan to cause destruction as a form of justice for their past suffering.

Liza awakens from her coma and informs Ann, Jimbo's wife, about the teenagers' plans to infiltrate the White House. Ann seeks help from Melanie, who organizes the final of American Genius at the White House. Ann and Liza join forces to prevent the destruction planned by the teenagers.

Jimbo breaks free from prison using his powers and reunites with Liza. Together, they rush to the White House. However, their progress is impeded by guards until Liza unleashes her powers, allowing them to escape. Meanwhile, the four gifted teenagers manipulate soldiers and bodyguards into killing each other, resulting in Melanie's death.

Gil launches a nuclear attack on Killian University, but Sammy raises the possibility that Ann's unborn child may also possess supernatural abilities, saving her life. Jimbo arrives at the bunker in the White House, learning that Gil is leading the attack. A fight ensues, and Jimbo sacrifices himself to protect Ann, but Justin, the fifth contestant, shoots Gil, ending the madness.

After Jimbo's death, Killian's company goes bankrupt. Ann receives Jimbo's phone, containing a final video message left by Liza. Liza, Harry, Sammy, and Lee continue their search for gifted individuals, using Jimbo's game. However, Gil embarks on his own dark path, plotting sinister schemes.

Months later, the whereabouts of Liza, Harry, Sammy, Lee, and Gil remain unknown, while Ann, still pregnant, is left with the legacy of Jimbo's message and the ongoing search for gifted individuals.

== Cast ==
=== French ===
- Mathieu Kassovitz as Jimbo Ferrar, the main protagonist of the movie
- Alexis Tomassian as FOZZY/Young Jimbo
- Claire Guyot as Ann
- Sophie Chen as Lee Mishon
- Thomas Sagols as Gil Yepes, the main antagonist of the movie
- Jessica Monceau as Liza Everton
- Julie Dumas as Melanie Killian
- David Scarpuzza as Sammy Goldberg
- Diouc Koma as Harry Sparks
- Féodor Atkine as Charles Killian
- Pierre-François Pistorio as Jenkins
- Cédric Dumond as Lorenzo Carvahal
- Patrick Donnay as The President
- Jerome Keen as Doctor
- Gautier de Fauconval as Justin
- Alexandre Cross as Lieutenant Smith
- Benoît Van Dorslaer as Chester

=== English ===
- Jeffrey Evan Thomas as Jimbo Ferrar
- Stephanie Sheh as Ann/Lee Mishon
- Ben Schiller as Gil Yepes
- Lauren Ashley Carter as Liza Everton
- Cindy Robinson as Melanie Killian
- Dick Smallberries Jr. as Sammy Goldberg
- Ogie Banks as Harry Sparks
- JB Blanc as Charles Killian / Priest
- Bob Buccholz as Jenkins
- Rene Rosado as Lorenzo Carvahal
- Karen Strassman as Elizabeth Farrar (Jimbo's mom)
- Ben Diskin as Diaz Arnesto
- Michael Sorich as Lieutenant Jack McKenzie
- Chris Marlowe as The President
- Donald Leary as Lieutenant Smith
- Joey Lotsko as Doctor
- Wendee Lee as Liza's mother
- Mari Devon as Mrs. McKenzie
- Jaime Seibert as William Farrar (Jimbo's father)
- Michole White as Harry's mother
- Jonas Alexander Sansone as Sammy / Fozzy / Young Jimbo

== Motion-capture performers ==
- Jeffrey Evan Thomas as Jimbo Ferrar
- Isabelle Van Waes as Ann
- Sophie Chen as Lee Mishon
- Jacob Rosenbaum as Gil Yepes/Young Jimbo
- Lauren Ashley Carter as Liza Everton
- Moon Dailly as Melanie Killian
- Nilton Martins as Sammy Goldberg
- Dante Bacote as Harry Sparks
- Dominic Gould as Charles Killian
- Jérôme Cachon as Jenkins
- Alex Martin as Jenkins
- Alain Figlarz as Lorenzo Carvahal
- Patrick Vo as Diaz Arnesto
- Patrice Melennec as Lieutenant Jack McKenzie
- Tom Leick as Doctor/The President
- Diego Mestanza as Justin
- Yves Le Caignec as Lieutenant Smith
- Solange Milhaud as Liza's mother/Mrs. McKenzie
- Arnita Swanson as Harry's mother

== Reception ==
=== Box office ===
The Prodigies grossed a worldwide total of $1.3 million against a budget of $31.6 million, making the film a box office bomb.

In France, the film was released in 282 theaters and grossed $957,287 in its opening weekend, ranking 11th. In its second weekend, the film grossed $322,595 from 279 theaters, falling down to 16th.

=== Critical reception ===
On Rotten Tomatoes, the film holds an approval rating of 20% based on 5 reviews, with an average rating of 3.1/10.

Linda Barnard of Toronto Star wrote that the film was "too violent for youngsters and so poorly written it won't engage an older audience, it seems to be targeted towards youthful nerds nursing overwhelming revenge fantasies." Liz Braun of Jam! Movies wrote, "You wouldn't expose a teenager to this, that's for sure, but the storytelling is so ham-handed that few adults would sit still for it" Dave McGinn of Globe and Mail was critical, writing, "The Prodigies pulls together a lot of familiar tropes from superhero movies without adding anything new or compelling to the genre."

In contrast, Sarah Gopaul of Digital Journal gave the film a positive review, stating, "The Prodigies delivers a noteworthy new approach to the 'teens with super powers' genre that is worth the big screen treatment."
