= She Came from the Woods =

- Theatrical release poster
- Directed by: Erik Bloomquist
- Written by: Erik Bloomquist; Carson Bloomquist
- Produced by: Erik Bloomquist; Carson Bloomquist; Cara Buono; William Sadler; Adam Weppler
- Starring: Cara Buono; Clare Foley; Spencer List; Michael Park; William Sadler
- Cinematography: Mike Magilnick
- Edited by: Carson Bloomquist; Erik Bloomquist
- Music by: Timothy Williams
- Production company: Mainframe Pictures
- Distributed by: Blue Finch Films; Tubi
- Release dates: August 27, 2022 (FrightFest); February 10, 2023
- Running time: 101 minutes
- Country: United States
- Language: English

She Came from the Woods is a 2022 American horror film written by Erik Bloomquist and Carson Bloomquist, directed by Erik Bloomquist and starring Cara Buono, Clare Foley, Spencer List and William Sadler. It is based on the 2017 short film of the same name.

== Plot ==
During an end of the season party, the counsellors at Camp Briarbrook are persuaded into performing a blood ritual to summon Nurse Agatha by Peter, the prodigal grandson of the camp's owner and family patriarch, Gilbert McAlister. According to urban legend, Agatha terrorized the camp with her occult experiments forty years earlier until she was forcibly stopped. The ritual proves to be successful and Agatha possesses a counselor Danny and several children Peter's brother Shawn had been driving home. Danny suddenly bludgeons another counselor, Kellie, to death in front of the others and in turn he is killed by Mike in self defense. The children return to the camp where they resurrect Agatha.

The counsellors return to the main lodge where head counselor and mother to Peter and Shawn, Heather, is tidying up. The power goes out as she calls the police injuring her. Three counselors Mike, Veronica and Dylan go to look for two missing counselors Ben and Ashley when Dylan scares Veronica causing her to run away. Mike finds Veronica bound to a bed with her tongue cut out. Ashley is also killed and devoured by the possessed children.

Confronting his mother Heather, Gilbert, and Shawn (who had returned to the camp), Peter earns the full truth. Agatha began working at the camp after she promised she could heal Gilbert's wife Evelyn of her crippling illness. However, she became obsessed with Gilbert and began poisoning Evelyn so she could be with him. During a state of severe emotional turmoil, Gilbert gave in to her advances and slept with her mere hours before Evelyn's death. After which she began experimenting on Heather and the other campers. Gilbert discovered the truth when he saw Agatha wearing Evelyn's wedding ring and murdered her, burying her body in the deep forest. The resurrected Agatha now seeks to reclaim the ring.

The children surround the lodge and Mike and Peter formulate a plan to trap them in the basement. Mike lures them inside and escapes only to find Dylan at the top of the stairs who cruelly kicks him back into the children who quickly surround and kill him.

The group then formulate a plan to trick Agatha into revealing herself, using Gilbert and Evelyn's ring as bait. As they do so Dylan forces Ben out of the lodge and he tortures him and leaves him as an offering to Agatha. Shawn, Peter and Lauren go to save Ben but Peter is killed by Agatha.

The plan proves to be successful, however Agatha grows angry and kills Gilbert when she discovers the ring is fake. The survivors then attack and defeat Agatha. They decide to dismember her and toss the pieces into the lake in hopes it will prevent her from returning. The next morning an officer arrives, having been called by a surviving Ben. The film ends with Lauren looking on in horror as the audience hears Agatha laughing, implying that they failed to destroy her.

== Cast ==
- Cara Buono as Heather McAlister
- Clare Foley as Lauren Davis
- Spencer List as Peter McAlister
- William Sadler as Gilbert McAlister
- Michael Park as Officer Matthews
- Tyler Elliot Burke as Shawn McCalister
- Adam Weppler as Dylan
- Ehad Berisha as Mike
- Dan Leahy as Ben
- Giselle Torres as Veronica
- Sienna Hubert-Ross as Ashley
- Emily Keefe as Kellie
- Erik Bloomquist as Danny
- Cory Asinofsky as Pizza Guy

== Production ==
In June 2021, it was announced that filming wrapped in Connecticut.

In July 2022, it was announced that Blue Finch Films acquired world sales rights to the film.

== Release ==
She Came from the Woods premiered at FrightFest on August 27, 2022. It was released theatrically on February 10, 2023, and released on Tubi on June 10, 2023.

== Reception ==
On the review aggregator website Rotten Tomatoes, 74% of 27 critics' reviews are positive. The website's consensus reads: "An uneasy 80's set blend of comedy and horror, She Came From The Woods is just fast paced and inventive enough to recommend."

Bobby LePire of Film Threat rated the film a 9 out of 10, calling it "a frightening, funny flick that perfectly pays homage to the classics and cult favorites of the early years of the slasher genre."
