= Bringing Up Bobby (2011 film) =

- Theatrical release poster
- Directed by: Famke Janssen
- Written by: Famke Janssen
- Story by: Cole Frates; Famke Janssen
- Produced by: Sofia Sondervan; Famke Janssen
- Starring: Milla Jovovich; Spencer List; Rory Cochrane; Marcia Cross; Bill Pullman
- Cinematography: Guido van Gennep
- Edited by: Job ter Burg
- Music by: Tom Holkenborg
- Production companies: Dutch Tilt Film; Eris Productions; Head Gear Films; Metrol Technology; Fu Works; Rinkel Film
- Distributed by: Monterey Media (United States); Benelux Film Distributors (Netherlands)
- Release dates: May 12, 2011 (Cannes); September 28, 2012 (United States)
- Running time: 93 minutes
- Countries: United States; Netherlands
- Language: English
- Box office: $4,975

Bringing Up Bobby is a 2011 comedy-drama film written, directed and produced by Famke Janssen (marking her directorial debut). Milla Jovovich stars as Olive, a Ukrainian con artist who struggles to raise her son Bobby (Spencer List) as a single mother in the United States, with her criminal past jeopardizing their future. Kent (Bill Pullman) and his wife Mary (Marcia Cross), struggling with their own son's death, adopt Bobby until Olive can reform. The film had its world premiere at the 2011 Cannes Film Festival on May 12 and received a limited release in the United States on September 28, 2012.

== Plot ==
Ukrainian single mother Olive Younger test drives a Cadillac with her son Bobby, calling each other Bonnie and Clyde. While the car salesman Aaron Kessler gets paperwork, Olive drives away to Walt's service garage in Guthrie, Oklahoma. He offers $2,000, but she keeps it. They find a home, play the "special movie guessing game," and Bobby enters school, where his teacher reports an "F." Olive masquerades as pregnant to con food from the store. Her neighbor John Lewis III complains about Bobby throwing cans at cars and making prank calls, then quotes Matthew 18:2-6 – Olive plays along, "Amen," quoting Psalm 127:3. Walt takes Olive out for fun at "Bowling for the Lord" where she dances with Tommy Lee Jones (not from Texas). She poses as Marie Elise from France and collects donations for South American church children. Bobby drinks beer and has Walt's motorcycle towed.

Their carefree ways abruptly cease when real estate mogul Kent Moody hits Bobby with his Porsche while skateboarding. The doctor says Bobby fractured his leg. Kent's limo driver Gerry drives them home. Olive unsuccessfully seeks $889,000 via insurance fraud for Bobby's "brain damage." Kent ushers Olive passed his gatekeeper secretary, Carol. In his office, Olive sees a photo of Kent's wife Mary and son Jamie, "a sad story for another time."

Two Blue Wire insurance investigators arrive; Walt poses as Gerald Butler, a London physician. Bobby feigns mental distress wearing a goat's head mask. Police arrive next, and Lewis points out Olive and Bobby bowling; they arrest Olive. Kent and Mary visit her in jail, offering to legally adopt Bobby to keep him out of juvenile detention and foster homes. Judge Donald L. Deason will rule whether she can get Bobby back after proving herself "a changed woman."

Eight months later : Olive is released. Walt drives her to Kent's Nichols Hills mansion, but asks about houses she burned down in Kansas City for the insurance; she says, "No, I'm done." Kent's maid shows her to Bobby, playing ball with Mary and Kent, who wants to schedule future visits. Olive stays with Walt and his girlfriend Darlene in a CRI&P caboose. She starts work cleaning, but can't stand her co-worker's tone-deaf whistling. Mary teaches Bobby to dance, entering him into private school where he learns baseball, piano, and chess. Bobby's dropout friend Earl visits, but Earl's friends ask about weed.

Walt and Darlene roll joints to sell. Angry at them for jeopardizing custody, Olive moves out. She takes another job twirling an Uncle Sam's Muffler Shop sign. Bobby's classmates start a fight about his "jail bird" mom. Mary sees Olive going home after work to the City Rescue Mission; she convinces Kent to give Olive their guest house. Bobby steals Mary's dress for Olive; she warns him. Walt visits Olive at Kent's, with a scheme to sell homes illegally, arguing "one big score" to provide for Bobby herself.

Earl gets Bobby into trouble, prank calling 911 about a school shooting at Marymount. Meanwhile, Mary catches Olive trying on her many shoes, finding the stolen dress in Olive's purse. The Village police and fire departments respond in force, scaring Bobby, who is arrested. Detective Winters warns it was a "grave offense" after events at Columbine; a Class "A" misdemeanor punishable by 180 days in jail, but since Bobby is only eleven, he is not charged. Privately, she asks Olive how she ended up like this? "What happened to you?" She discloses statistics for children of convicts, asking Olive to seriously consider what she wants for Bobby's future.

Olive hears Kent arguing, "We can't have him without her," and Mary arguing they can't have "a positive influence" with Olive around. Olive tells Bobby a story, concluding she has to go away "to school...to learn new things." She meets Walt who plans to break into Kent's real estate office to copy his database, but it's a trap; Olive called Detective Winters, who overhears Walt's plan. She threatens arrest if he tries anything. Winters assures Olive, "You did the right thing. You stay on this path and you stand a good chance of getting Bobby back." Olive thanks Winters and walks away.

== Cast ==
- Milla Jovovich as Olive
- Spencer List as Bobby
- Rory Cochrane as Walt
- Marcia Cross as Mary
- Bill Pullman as Kent

== Production ==
In the summer of 2010, the film was shot over 20 days in Oklahoma. The film was inspired by Janssen's own perception as a European who came to live in the United States.

== Soundtrack ==
The original film score was composed by Junkie XL (as Tom Holkenborg). In addition, the soundtrack includes a cover version of "Proud Mary", sung by lead actress Milla Jovovich in Ukrainian. The song plays in the background at the beginning of the film. The recording, which is credited to Milla Jovovich with The Modern Mothers, is based on Ike & Tina Turner's popular version of the song. After the recording session, Jovovich's voice was hoarse for a few days.

The American alternative rock band The Flaming Lips recorded a version of "Amazing Grace", also in Ukrainian. The recording plays during the end credits. Lead singer Wayne Coyne does not speak the language but sang the lyrics phonetically. The soundtrack also contains various country, folk and jazz songs by artists such as Johnny Paycheck, Count Basie, Jack Teagarden, Cat Stevens, Jorma Kaukonen, Ray Hatcher, Roy Lanham & The Whippoorwills, and Joe Mahan. A soundtrack album was not released.

== Release ==
Video Film Express holds all media rights for the Netherlands, while Monterey Media holds all rights for the United States and Canada.

=== Festivals ===
Bringing Up Bobby was selected to screen at the following film festivals:

- 2012 Newport Beach Film Festival
- 2012 Dallas International Film Festival
- 2012 Santa Cruz Film Festival
- 2012 Nashville Film Festival
- 2012 White Sands International Film Festival
- 2012 Omaha Film Festival
- 2010 Deauville American Film Festival
- 2011 Savannah Film Festival

== Reception ==
The film has received mainly negative reviews, with a 'rotten' 17% rating on review aggregator Rotten Tomatoes and a 4.9 rating on the Internet Movie Database.
