= Two Ninas =

- Directed by: Neil Turitz
- Written by: Neil Turitz
- Produced by: Greg Scheinman; Denise Doyle
- Starring: Amanda Peet; Cara Buono; Ron Livingston
- Cinematography: Joaquin Baca-Asay
- Edited by: Jumbulingam Chandrasekhar
- Music by: Joseph Saba
- Release date: May 1999 (Gen Art)
- Running time: 88 minutes
- Country: United States
- Language: English

Two Ninas is a 1999 American romantic comedy film written and directed by Neil Turitz and starring Amanda Peet, Cara Buono and Ron Livingston.

== Cast ==
- Amanda Peet as Nina Harris
- Cara Buono as Nina Cohen
- Ron Livingston as Marty Sachs
- Jill Hennessy as Mike the Bartender
- Bray Poor as Dave Trout
- Linda Larkin as Carrie Boxer
- John Rothman as Barry Litzer

== Release ==
The film premiered at the Gen Art Festival in May 1999.

== Reception ==
On the review aggregator website Rotten Tomatoes, 67% of 9 critics' reviews are positive. Metacritic, which uses a weighted average, assigned the film a score of 41 out of 100, based on 8 critics, indicating "mixed or average" reviews.

Variety gave the film a positive review: "Film debut of writer-director Neil Turitz is a solid twentysomething romantic comedy. In covering well-trod territory, he manages a few twists..."

Stephen Holden of The New York Times gave the film a negative review and wrote, "the characters and situations are so utterly predictable that the movie has no sense of surprise. Instead of exploring its zanier possibilities, the movie takes it own setup far too seriously, and the humor rarely levitates."

Peter Travers of Rolling Stone gave the film a positive review and wrote, "Turitz keeps it comic and romantic in just the right doses. Looking for a fun date flick? You found it."

Kevin Thomas of the Los Angeles Times also gave the film a positive review and wrote, "It is amazing how writer-director Neil Turitz, a seasoned journalist, has taken the familiar ingredients of the spiky New York dating game movie and made them seem so fresh and original, filled with individuals acutely detailed and compassionately observed."
