= The Orphan Killer =

- Directed by: Matt Farnsworth
- Written by: Matt Farnsworth
- Produced by: Matt Farnsworth; Diane Foster
- Starring: Diane Foster; David Backus; Matt Farnsworth
- Music by: Bullet Tooth
- Production company: Full Fathom 5
- Distributed by: ITunes; Vimeo; Full Fathom 5
- Release date: November 1, 2011
- Running time: 83 minutes
- Country: United States
- Language: English

The Orphan Killer is a 2011 independent horror film written and directed by Matt Farnsworth. It was produced by Farnsworth and Full Fathom 5. Farnsworth has stated that he has plans for sequels and a web series.

== Plot ==
The film follows the life of two children who become wards of the state in New Jersey after a home invasion results in the murder of their parents. Having witnessed the murder, Marcus is forever changed. The siblings are sent to a Catholic orphanage where Audrey is subsequently adopted and Marcus is left behind. He suffers abuse at the hands of the caretakers and as a punishment is masked and exiled. Never forgiving his sister for abandoning him, Marcus returns to his sister's life many years later in adulthood, still masked, wanting to teach her a lesson.

== Cast ==
- Diane Foster as Audrey
  - Dana DeVestern as Young Audrey
- David Backhaus as Marcus Miller
  - Spencer List as Young Marcus
- Matt Farnsworth as Mike
- James McCaffrey as Detective Jones
- John Savage as Detective Walker
- Karen Young as Sister Mary
- Charlotte Maier as Sister Constance
- Margot White as Jenny Miller
- Mike Doyle as Marcus Miller Sr.
- Ivan Martin as Jim
- Karen Olivo as Angie
- Matthew Arkin as Bob
- Ezra Knight as Simon
- Allison Salvetti as Ghost Orphan
- Jon David Casey as Jerry

== Release ==
A limited test release of The Orphan Killer was distributed through Facebook. The film also premiered at the Sitges Film Festival, where it was shown in the Brigadoon section of the festival. The film was also shown at the 30th Festival de Cine de Terror de Molins de Rei. In Mexico, the film premiered in three different locations across the country at the Morbido Film Festival.

=== Awards ===
The film received an award at the Festival de Cine de Terror de Molins de Rei for "Best Picture". In Italy, director Farnsworth was honored with an Antonio Margheriti award at the Tohorror film festival for his work on the film. The award "symbolizes the birth of a new master creator in the genre and his monster".

=== Reception ===
Reception for the film has been mixed with Germany banning the film. HorrorNews.net said that the movie is "a return to classic horror with a lethal bang". Dread Central also reviewed the film, stating "It is a low-budget offering and often looks like it" but that "You're getting a new slasher, one with a lot of similarities to some of our favorite characters of the past, but with its own unique spin". Fangoria panned the film, writing that "these filmmakers had everything they needed to create something special, and simply chose to go the least interesting route".

== Soundtrack ==
The soundtrack for The Orphan Killer was released in February 2011 on the movie's Facebook page.

=== Track list ===
1. First Blood - First Blood
2. Affiance - Nostra Culpa
3. Asking Alexandria - Someone, Somewhere
4. Deception of a Ghost - These Voices
5. Anew Revolution - Head Against the Wall
6. This or the Apocalypse - Charmer
7. Most Precious Blood - A Danger to Myself and Others
8. A Bullet for a Pretty Boy - The Deceiver
9. Dawn of Ashes - Seething the Flesh in the River of Phlegethon
10. First Blood - Conflict
11. Born of Osiris - Follow the Signs
12. No Bragging Rights - Death of an Era
13. First Blood - Execution
14. Ventana - Cry Little Sister

== Sequels ==
Farnsworth announced plans for a sequel to The Orphan Killer shortly after the film's premiere in 2011. In an interview with Starburst magazine he stated that he had completed the scripts for a second and third films and that he planned to release a web series based upon the first film in 2013.
