= Amber (TV series) =

2014 Irish TV series

- Genre: Crime drama; Thriller
- Created by: Rob Cawley; Paul Duane
- Written by: Rob Cawley; Gary Duggan
- Directed by: Thaddeus O'Sullivan
- Starring: Eva Birthistle; David Murray; Justine Mitchell; David Herlihy; Emily Nagle; Declan Conlon; Lauryn Canny; Levi O'Sullivan
- Composer: Leon O'Neill
- Country of origin: Ireland
- Original language: English
- No. of seasons: 1
- No. of episodes: 4

Production
- Executive producers: Rob Cawley; Paul Duane; Jane Gogan
- Producer: Paul Donovan
- Production locations: Dublin, Ireland
- Cinematography: Peter Robertson
- Editor: Tony Cranstoun
- Running time: 60 minutes
- Production companies: RTÉ; Screenworks Ireland

Original release
- Network: RTÉ One; BBC Four (UK)
- Release: 19 January – 22 January 2014

Amber is an Irish television crime drama series, created by Rob Cawley and Paul Duane and directed by Thaddeus O'Sullivan, that broadcast across four consecutive nights on RTÉ One from 19 to 22 January 2014. The series stars Eva Birthistle and David Murray as parents of a young teenage girl, Amber Bailey (Lauryn Canny), who disappears after being dropped off by her father at a friends' house in Dublin.

Amber was produced by Screenworks Ireland for RTÉ, with funding from the Broadcasting Authority of Ireland. The series was produced in 2011, and following a distribution deal with Content Media Corporation, the series broadcast in Denmark, Sweden, Israel, Latin America, Brazil, Canada and Australia before premiering in its native country.

The series broadcast on BBC Four in the UK in June 2014, airing on Fridays in a graveyard slot. The series is also available on Netflix in some regions, and is available to stream on Amazon Video in the UK. A Region 2 DVD was issued via Arrow Films on 30 June 2014. The series has received mixed reviews from critics, and audiences expressed dissatisfaction with the unresolved conclusion to the mini-series. Producers defended the ending, as a realistic portrayal of how someone can remain missing indefinitely.

== Cast ==
=== Main ===
- Eva Birthistle as Sarah Bailey; mother of Amber and Eamon and estranged wife of Ben
- David Murray as Ben Bailey; father of Amber and Eamon, estranged husband of Sarah and CEO of a security firm
- Justine Mitchell as Maeve Flynn-Dunne; best friend of Sarah and a newspaper reporter
- David Herlihy as Declan McCarthy; friend of Ben and co-director of the same security firm
- Emily Nagle as Sgt. Karen Mulcahy; friend of Ben and Sarah and one of the police officers investigating Amber's disappearance
- Declan Conlon as D.I. Rob Dunlop; friend of Ben and the lead inspector investigating Amber's disappearance
- Lauryn Canny as Amber Bailey; 14-year-old artistic daughter of Sarah and Ben, who disappears on her way home from the city
- Levi O'Sullivan as Eamon Bailey; youngest child of Sarah and Ben, and Amber's brother
- Gary Whelan as Supt. Jack Stirrat; commanding officer overseeing the investigation into Amber's disappearance
- Ned Dennehy as Terrence O'Donoghue; a prisoner who tells Maeve he has information pertaining to Amber's disappearance
- Dan Li as Charlie; an illegal immigrant from China who volunteers to help search for Amber
- Noel Gaskin as 'Dog Man'; an unidentified perp seen talking to Amber a day or so before her disappearance
- Shauna Griffith as Jenny; Amber's best friend
- Andrew Mullan as Manga-Boy; Amber's secret boyfriend

=== Supporting ===
- Stella McCusker as Trish
- Laura Jane Laughlin as Cherry
- Eleanor Methven as Margaret
- Janice Byrne as Gemma
- Eric Lalor as Bernard
- Stephen Jones as Squeak
- Vinny Murphy as Larry
- Aenne Barr as Deirdre Costello
- Jane McGrath as Natalie Costello
- Deirdre Donnelly as Maureen O'Donoghue
- Shashi Rami as Dev
- Craig Kenny as Milligan
- Gabriela Duane as Gabi
- Mirjana Rendulic as Jolanta
- Michael Liebman as Martin
- Ronan Leahy as Mark

== Episodes ==
No.	Title	Directed by	Written by	Irish Viewers (millions)	Airdate
1	"Sarah"	Thaddeus O'Sullivan	Rob Cawley	0.65	19 January 2014; 6 June 2014 (UK)
Fourteen-year-old Amber is dropped off by her dad near a friend's house in the suburbs of Dublin, but she never turns up there. She just disappears.
2	"Maeve"	Thaddeus O'Sullivan	Rob Cawley & Gary Duggan	0.67	20 January 2014; 13 June 2014 (UK)
As the investigation into Amber's whereabouts continues, Maeve is contacted by a prisoner who claims to have new information to share about the 14-year-old's disappearance. After extorting 10,000 euros, he directs police to an old grave of a woman in her 20s and hangs himself.
3	"Charlie"	Thaddeus O'Sullivan	Rob Cawley & Gary Duggan	0.73	21 January 2014; 20 June 2014 (UK)
DI Dunlop and Sgt Mulachy begin their investigation into Amber's disappearance under the impression that her mobile phone, so far unaccounted for, holds the key to solving the mystery. The inquiry gathers pace as Charlie, an illegal immigrant, discovers the device.
4	"Ben"	Thaddeus O'Sullivan	Rob Cawley & Gary Duggan	0.77	22 January 2014; 27 June 2014 (UK)
The two-year search for Amber begins to take its toll on Ben, and he becomes convinced that his daughter had been befriended by an online predator leading up to her disappearance.

== Accolades ==
At the 11th Irish Film & Television Awards, Eva Birthistle won the prize for Best Actress, while Thaddeus O'Sullivan was nominated for Best Director. Oscar winner Juliette Binoche praised Canny's debut performance.
