= Jug Face =

- Directed by: Chad Crawford Kinkle
- Written by: Chad Crawford Kinkle
- Produced by: Andrew van den Houten; Robert Tonino
- Starring: Sean Bridgers; Lauren Ashley Carter; Larry Fessenden; Sean Young; Daniel Manche; Michael G. Crandall
- Cinematography: Chris Heinrich
- Edited by: Zach Passero
- Music by: Sean Spillane
- Production company: Modernciné
- Release date: January 23, 2013 (Slamdance Film Festival)
- Running time: 81 minutes
- Country: United States
- Language: English

Jug Face is a 2013 American independent Southern Gothic supernatural horror film written and directed by Chad Crawford Kinkle, and starring Sean Bridgers, Lauren Ashley Carter, Larry Fessenden, Sean Young and Daniel Manche. The story follows a teen, played by Carter, who is pregnant with her brother's child and tries to escape from a backwoods community, only to discover that she must sacrifice herself to a creature in a pit.

== Plot ==
A backwoods community worships a pit with healing powers. Dawai creates jugs of faces from clay, and when a jug portrays the face of a member of the community, that person must be sacrificed to the creature that lives in the pit. Ada, who has been having sex with her brother Jessaby, finds her own face on Dawai’s latest jug. Scared, she hides the jug and keeps it a secret.

Ada is arranged to be "joined" to a boy from another family, Bodey. Later, Ada discovers she is pregnant. While she is with Bodey's sister, Eileen, Ada has a vision of Eileen's death, and the creature later kills Eileen. Worried that they have angered the creature, the community questions Dawai, who claims to be ignorant of whether there's a missing jug, as he creates them while under a trance. The townspeople become frustrated with Dawai and demand that he search for any potentially missing jugs. Ada meets with Dawai, and she suggests that he create a new one from memory. Ada's mother, Loriss, inspects her to see if she is a virgin, and Ada claims to have broken her own hymen. Loriss punishes Ada, who later informs Jessaby that she is pregnant.

The following day, the community gathers around the pit as Dawai presents his latest jug with the face of Bodey, who is sacrificed. Ada visits her sickly grandfather and sees a vision of an emaciated boy, who explains that her grandfather hid his wife's jug face the same as she did, and the community poisoned her grandfather as punishment. Jessaby tells Sustin, his father, that he is sick, so they go to the pit to heal him. Ada has a vision of Jessaby getting killed; the vision comes true. As it seems Dawai has failed again in interpreting the pit's desires, he is severely punished by the community and tied beside the pit to be taken. Ada breaks Dawai free, and they run off. However, the two are caught, taken back and punished by the community, who assume that it is Dawai with whom Ada had a relationship. Ada is whipped, miscarries her child, and then reveals to her parents that it was her brother's baby.

Ada has a vision of her father's death, and the creature kills him. She reveals to everyone that she was the missing jug face and that all the deaths are her fault. Her mother ties her up beside Dawai next to the pit. The Shunned Boy and Ada's grandfather appear and free her from her ropes, but she will not leave because she knows Dawai will be killed. The next morning, Ada's mother finds her free of her ropes but kneeling beside the Pit. Ada apologizes and is sacrificed. The film ends as Dawai lights a candle next to his jug face of Ada.

== Cast ==
- Lauren Ashley Carter as Ada
- Sean Bridgers as Dawai
- Sean Young as Loriss
- Larry Fessenden as Sustin
- Daniel Manche as Jesseby
- Kaitlin Cullum as Christie
- Mathieu Whitman as Bodey

== Production ==
In 2011, Jug Face writer/director, Chad Kinkle won the Slamdance Screenwriting Competition, and it was announced at the 2012 Slamdance Film Festival that Modernciné's Andrew van den Houten and Robert Tonino would produce the film in Nashville, Tennessee.

It was announced in January 2012 that Lauren Ashley Carter, Sean Bridgers, Larry Fessenden, and Sean Young were cast in the film. Young said that she found it difficult to play an unsympathetic character, but she enjoyed working with Carter and Fessenden. Young was deliberately made to look old, which she said was helped by the custom-made clothing.

Potter and sculptor Jason Mahlke designed and created the face jugs for the film.

== Release ==
The film was accepted at a number of film festivals, including its premiere at the 2013 Slamdance Film Festival. In 2013, it played at the Boston Underground Film Festival, Nashville Film Festival, and Nocturnal Film Festival.

After its premiere at Slamdance, Jug Face was acquired for a pre-theatrical VoD release in July by Gravitas Ventures, with a national theatrical release to follow.

Jug Face grossed $14,315 in domestic DVD sales and $7,491 in domestic Blu-ray sales, for a total of $21,806.

== Reception ==
Rotten Tomatoes, a review aggregator, reports that 76% of 21 surveyed critics with the average rating of 6.14/10. Metacritic rated it 58/100 based on nine reviews.

Brad Miska of Bloody Disgusting rated the film a 3.5 out of 5 and wrote, "Jug Face feels really small, in a good way, and captures the essence of this tiny group of worshippers. It's aesthetically similar to other Modernciné movies; it’s a look that gives the film quality and technical shows expertise. Although, it's carried by strong performances, and a few explicate [sic] shots of gore."

Brad McHargue, writing for Dread Central, praised Kinkle's script, as well as "the stellar performances of Carter and Bridgers." McHargue called it "loaded with talent" and "filled with emotion and just enough blood to keep the gore hounds satisfied." Ryan Larson, a writer for Shock Till You Drop, wrote that "Jug Face isn't a groundbreaking movie. But it's exceptional on a number of levels and is so because of a powerful director and some great acting."

Scott Weinberg, writing for Fearnet, praised the acting and wrote, "[T]he director's steadfast insistence on presenting a potentially outlandish horror tale as plainly and realistically as possible that elevates Jug Face beyond that of a mere curiosity." Rob Nelson of Variety described it as "an impressively oozing slab of indie horror that bodes well for first-time writer-director Chad Crawford Kinkle."

While the film is mainly praised for its script, effective low-budget filmmaking and performances, the story's supernatural elements received some criticism. In a Fangoria review, Samuel Zimmerman wrote: "While Jug Face is clearly on a tiny budget, it’s never bothersome until the frankly cornball appearance of the dead is revealed." Zimmerman adds, "These rough patches are slightly alleviated thanks to grounded work from Jug Face’s cast and Kinkle’s own depiction of this small community."

In a Twitch Film review, Ben Umstead wrote, "While steeped in thick atmosphere and anchored by some interesting riffs on classic horror tropes the film is far more underwhelming in execution than it is dynamic and provocative — elements that feel largely left on the page." Nicolas Rapold of The New York Times wrote, "Some low-budget manifestations of the supernatural jazz up the frights now and again, but as the novelty of worshiping a hole in the ground fades, the film paints itself into a corner."
