= Artik (film) =

2019 American horror film

- Directed by: Tom Botchii
- Written by: Tom Botchii
- Produced by: Jerry G. Angelo; Erik Bernard; Tom Botchii
- Starring: Chase Williamson; Jerry G. Angelo; Lauren Ashley Carter; Matt Mercer
- Cinematography: Martin Moody
- Edited by: Tom Botchii
- Music by: Corey Wallace
- Production companies: TLG Motion Pictures; Fire Born Studios; Have Not Films
- Release date: August 11, 2019 (United States)
- Running time: 78 minutes
- Country: United States
- Language: English

Artik is a 2019 American horror film written and directed by Tom Botchii. It stars Chase Williamson, Jerry G. Angelo and Lauren Ashley Carter. The film had its international premiere at Macabro and world premiere at Popcorn Frights.

== Plot ==
A comic book obsessed serial killer Artik teaches his son how to avoid a series of brutal murders until the boy reaches a mysterious man who blocks everything.

== Cast ==
- Chase Williamson as Holton
- Jerry G. Angelo as Artik
- Lauren Ashley Carter as Flin Brays
- Matt Mercer as Kar
- Gavin White as Boy Adam

== Reception ==
=== Critical response ===
Review aggregator website, Rotten Tomatoes gave it 100% rating, based on six reviews.

=== Accolades ===
Year	Award	Category	Result
2019	Dragon Awards	Best Feature	Won
2019	Shriekfest	Best Feature	Nominated
2019	Oaxaca FilmFest	Best Feature	Nominated
