= Peter Thum =

American businessman

- Born: c. 1970 (age c. 55)
- Education: Claremont McKenna College (BA); Northwestern University (MBA)
- Title: CEO, Liberty United
- Spouse: Cara Buono
- Children: 1 daughter

Peter Thum (born c. 1970) is an American businessman. He has founded several companies and not-for-profit organizations. He is best known for creating the brand Ethos Water and leading the company as its president through its acquisition by Starbucks.

== Early career and education ==
Thum graduated from Claremont McKenna College in 1990 with a degree in government. He then moved to Berlin, Germany, after the fall of the Berlin Wall. He went on to earn an MBA from The Kellogg School of Management at Northwestern University.

== Entrepreneurship ==
=== Ethos Water ===
In 2001, while working on a consulting project in South Africa for McKinsey & Company, Thum met people who lived in the townships and countryside who did not have access to safe water and adequate sanitation. These experiences inspired him to come up with the idea for Ethos Water. Thum led Ethos as president through its acquisition by Starbucks in 2005. From 2005 to 2008, he managed Ethos and other businesses as a vice president of Starbucks and guided its philanthropy as a Director of the Starbucks Foundation.

=== Giving Water ===
In 2008, Thum founded the not-for-profit organization Giving Water. Its mission is to fund programs providing water, adequate sanitation and hygiene education for children in need. Since then Giving Water has funded programs for over 6,000 school children in Kenya.

=== Fonderie 47 ===
Thum cofounded and is CEO of Fonderie 47, a brand formed in 2009 to turn assault rifles into jewelry, watches and accessories, under the stated aim of reducing the number and impact of assault rifles and other small arms.

=== Liberty United ===
In 2013, Thum launched Liberty United, an organization that partners with American communities and law enforcement to take illegal guns and bullet shell casings released from evidence and to create jewelry and other accessories in order to fund programs to reduce gun violence. Mark Ruffalo participated in the launch of the project. The organization provides children with extracurricular academic, sports and art classes, as well as job training.

== Other work ==
Thum advises companies and not-for-profit organizations on strategic issues including growth, marketing, corporate social responsibility programs, fundraising, and venture creation. He speaks about business and social topics at conferences and in the media. He also serves on the boards for several companies and organizations focused on service, including FEED projects.

He has served on multiple boards, including those of The Center for Human Rights at Claremont McKenna College; The Starbucks Foundation; The Fund for Global Human Rights; USA for UNHCR (The UN Refugee Agency); Impossible to Possible; The Deans Council of the Robert F. Wagner Graduate School of Public Service; Feed Projects, and; Tactivate.

== Awards and recognition ==
In April 2017, Thum received the For the Love of Children award from Children’s Home & Aid of Illinois.

In December 2015, Thum’s work was featured in the global advertising campaign of the Cross Pen Company.

In September 2015, Thum was featured in the global advertising campaign for UBS and photographed by Annie Leibovitz.

In October 2014, Thum was featured by Levi Strauss & Co. in its Unzipped series on innovators.

In April 2012, the Tribeca Film Festival and the Disruptor Foundation awarded Thum the Disruptive Innovation Award.

== Personal life ==
As of 2010, Thum lives in Greenwich Village, Manhattan, with his wife, actress Cara Buono, and their daughter.
