= Night Has Settled =

- Directed by: Steve Clark
- Starring: Spencer List; Pilar López de Ayala; Adriana Barraza; Nicholas Pinto; Raul Pinto Jr. Eric Nelsen
- Release date: 1 February 2014 (SBIFF)
- Running time: 90 minutes
- Country: United States
- Language: English

Night Has Settled is a 2014 American drama film directed by Steve Clark.

== Cast ==
- Spencer List as Oliver Nicholas
- Pilar López de Ayala as Luna Nicholas
- Adriana Barraza as Aida
- Eric Nelsen as Valerio
- Tommy Nelson as Nick
- Nicholas Pinto as High School Student
- Raul Pinto Jr. as High School Student
- Ashley Reyes as Daisy
- Adam LeFevre as Kimo
