= Lauren Ashley Carter =

American actress and producer

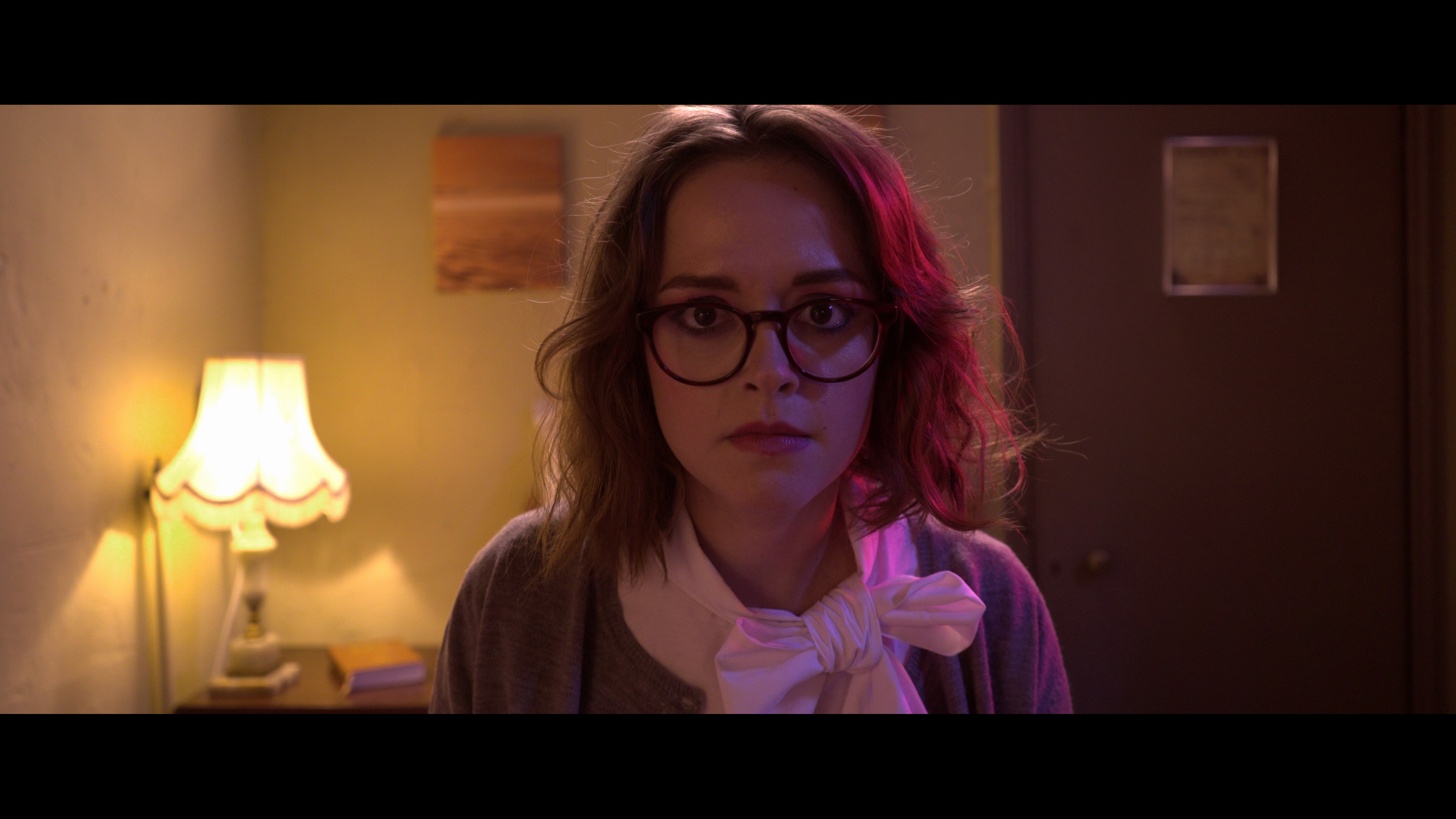
- Carter in the 2018 short film Once Bitten...
- Occupations: Actress and Producer
- Years active: 2008–present

Lauren Ashley Carter is an American actress and producer.

== Early life and education ==
Carter grew up in Ohio and graduated from the University of Cincinnati – College-Conservatory of Music with a Bachelor of Fine Arts degree in Dramatic Performance in 2008.

== Career ==
=== Film ===
Variety described her acting in Jug Face as "a fine performance", and The New York Times wrote of her acting in The Woman that it was "dexterously understated". In 2016 Carter wrote a piece for the Modern Horrors website in which she discussed a film role that she turned down due to concerns for her safety.

=== Theatre ===
In 2014, Carter played Ruth in The Human Race Theatre Company's production of Miracle On South Division Street at the Loft Theatre in Dayton, Ohio.

== Personal life ==
She is a fan of horror and science fiction. In a 2016 interview with SciFiNow, Carter said "If you say you don’t like horror, it just means that you haven’t found the right movie." In 2019, Carter explained that she became a horror fan because she watched horror films on VHS with her father.

== Filmography ==
=== Film ===
Year	Title	Role	Notes
2008	Waiting Room	Alison	Short - credited as Lauren Carter
2010	Rising Stars	Natalie	
2010	Black	Noir	Short
2011	The Woman	Peggy Cleek	
2011	The Prodigies	Liza Everton	
2011	Mantua	Noir Noive	
2012	Premium Rush	Phoebe	
2013	Jug Face	Ada	Released on DVD in the UK as "The Pit"
2013	Jack's Not Sick Anymore	Naomi	Short
2014	Bereavement	Mary	Short
2015	Pod	Lyla	
2015	Darling	Darling	
2015	The Mind's Eye	Rachel Meadows	AKA "Supernatural Forces"
2017	Imitation Girl	Julianna / Imitation	
2017	King Rat	Hailey	
2017	Gags the Clown	Heather Duprey	
2018	Once Bitten...	Martha Swales	Short
2018	Black Site	Agent Leonhart	AKA "Dark Gods"
2018	Hail Maria!	Maria	Short
2019	Artik	Flin Brays	
2019	Darlin'	Peggy	
2021	A Little More Flesh II	As herself	
2021	Eating Cars	Megan	
2027	Exposure	Mia	Short

=== Television ===
Year	Title	Role	Notes
2011	Law & Order: Special Victims Unit: Pursuit (season 12, episode 17)	Lisa Banks	1 episode
2016	Above Average Presents	Michelle	1 episode
2016	The Mentors	Mentee	1 episode
2016-2017	The Special Without Brett Davies	Sen. Diane Harris / Reporter	2 episodes

=== Web series ===
Year	Title	Role	Notes
2013	Tea Time with Lauren Ashley Carter	As herself	4 episodes
2017	The Hawkins Family Yule Log	Daughter	1 episode
