= Ethos Water =

Brand of bottled water

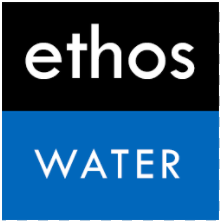
- Type: Subsidiary
- Industry: Food industry
- Founded: 2001; 25 years ago
- Founder: Peter Thum
- Headquarters: Japan
- Area served: Worldwide
- Products: Bottled water
- Parent: Starbucks (2005-present)

Ethos Water is an American brand of bottled water with a social mission of "helping children get clean water." A Starbucks subsidiary, Ethos began in 2001 when Peter Thum had the idea after working in communities in South Africa that lacked access to clean water. Thum, who was working as consultant for McKinsey & Company at the time, realized the potential to create a bottled water brand to raise awareness and funding for safe water programs. The idea became an obsession for Thum, and he wrote the business plan for Ethos, left McKinsey, and moved to New York in early 2002 to start the venture.

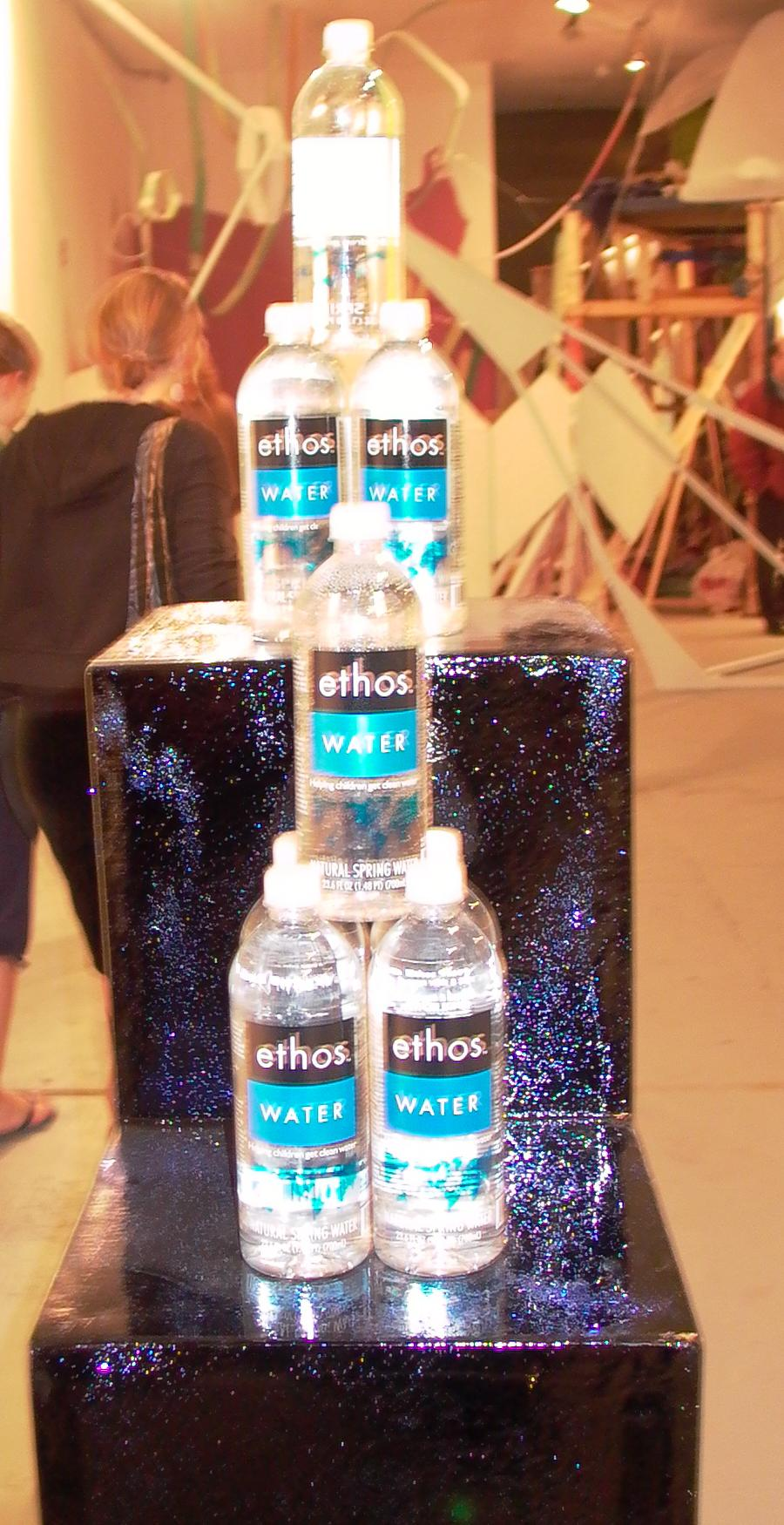
A display of Ethos water

Thum recruited his business school classmate Jonathan Greenblatt to join Ethos in late 2002. They launched operations as a bottled water company in August 2003, and also formed an organization called "Ethos International" to invest funds from the business in safe water programs.

Since only $0.05-0.10 of the retail price ($1.80) goes to charity, the Ethos brand is primarily commercial and therefore a for-profit organization. Nevertheless, as of at least 2009, Ethos, through the Starbucks Foundation, had granted more than $6 million, according to the company, to help support water, sanitation and hygiene education programs.

Ethos water is manufactured by PepsiCo and Safeway's Lucerne brand, but unlike other Pepsi products, Ethos bottles do not contain recycled plastic.

In 2005, Starbucks purchased the company for $8 million.

== Criticism ==
Starbucks was criticized in 2015 for sourcing their Ethos water from California during the drought. The company had been drawing water from two areas described by the US National Drought Mitigation Center as being in “exceptional drought”. In May 2015, the company moved production to Pennsylvania and sourced its water from Naturalle Springs located in Greeneville, Tennessee. Currently, Premium Waters, Inc. bottles Ethos Water from the Lafayette Spring in Lafayette Township.
