= Clare Foley =

American actress

- Occupation: Actress
- Years active: 2010–present

Clare Foley is an American actress. She is known for playing the roles of Ruby Taylor in Do No Harm, Ashley in Sinister, a young version of Piper in Orange Is the New Black and Ivy Pepper, a version of Pamela Isley in the first two seasons of Gotham appearing in a cameo role in the show's third season to pass the role to actress Maggie Geha.

== Filmography ==
=== Film ===
Year	Title	Role	Notes
2011	Win Win	Abby	
2012	Sinister	Ashley Oswalt	
2012	Same Ghost Every Night	Jessy	Short film
2013	Very Good Girls	Phoebe	
2013	Fool's Day	Clare	Short film
2013	Before I Sleep	Child Phoebe	
2014	Every Secret Thing	Mary Paige	
2015	Mistress America	Peggy	
2015	Southpaw	Alice	
2015	Sinister 2	Ashley Oswalt	Credited as Claire Foley
2015	The Great Gilly Hopkins	Agnes	
2015	Frog	Eva	Short film
2016	Little Men	Sally	
2016	Half the Perfect World	Rachel	
2020	The Death of Marie	Nico	Short film
2020	The Elephant in the Room	Grace	Short film
2021	The Changed	Kim	
2022	She Came from the Woods	Lauren Davis	

=== Television ===
Year	Title	Role	Notes
2010	Team Umizoomi	Baby Hawk (voice)	Episode: "The Rolling Toy Parade"
2010	Law & Order: Criminal Intent	Amanda Novak	Episode: "Gods & Insects"
2012	Girls	Lola Lavoyt	2 episodes
2013	Do No Harm	Ruby Taylor	3 episodes
2014	Law & Order: Special Victims Unit	Chelsea Summers-Maddox	Episode: "Reasonable Doubt"
2014	Orange is the New Black	Young Piper Chapman	Episode: "Thirsty Bird"
2014–2016	Gotham	Ivy "Pamela" Pepper	Recurring (season 1–2), guest (season 3); 10 episodes
