= Chonda Pierce =

American comedian, TV host, author and actor

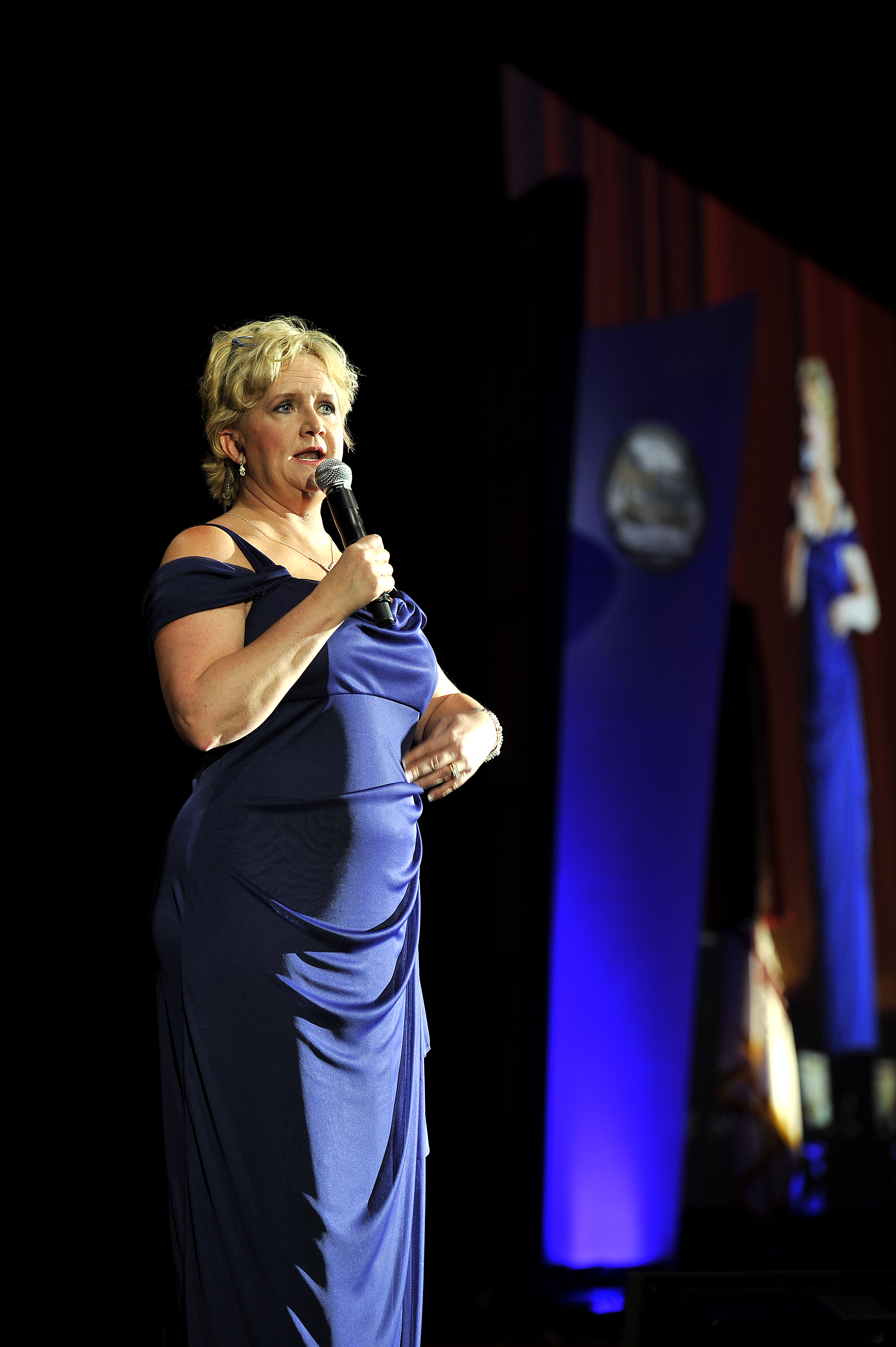

Background information
- Born: Chonda Ruth Courtney; March 4, 1960 (age 66); Covington, Kentucky
- Genre: Contemporary Christian
- Occupations: Singer, comedian
- Instrument: Piano
- Years active: present
- Website: chonda.org

Chonda Pierce (born March 4, 1960) is an American stand-up comedian, television hostess, author and actor.

Pierce has an ongoing concert calendar and her comedy segments frequently appear on XM Radio's Laugh USA and Sirius Satellite Radio's Blue Collar Comedy 103. She is the RIAA's number one selling female comedian of all time.

Pierce is a founding member of the Christian Comedy Association and the Branches Recovery Center and has been a spokesperson for World Vision International, Compassion International, Food for the Hungry, and most recently ChildFund, as well as working with various other Christian leaders and organizations.

== Early life ==
She was born Chonda Ruth Courtney in Covington, Kentucky, on March 4, 1960, and raised in South Carolina by her father, Charles Courtney, who was a preacher, and her mother Virginia Whalen. Chonda channeled a troubled childhood into on-stage comedic entertainment as a much needed catharsis, stating "I was hooked! I loved the sound of an audience laughing. It was just the medicine I needed." She attended Trevecca Nazarene University and Austin Peay State University.

== Career ==
=== Early career ===
Pierce got her start working at the Opryland Theme Park in Nashville where she performed as Grand Ole Opry star Minnie Pearl. Pierce recalls being a terrible dancer and was told by her boss to "find a new talent". In order to keep her job, she memorized three pages of jokes from Sarah Cannon's famous stage performance as Minnie Pearl, and then went on to impersonate Miss Minnie for six years. While Pierce enjoyed singing and dancing, it was at this time that she truly fell in love with her craft. After deciding to pursue comedy full-time, she recorded "Second Row, Piano Side", a comedy DVD drawing material from her childhood growing up as the daughter of a preacher in South Carolina. Pierce's material resonated with people from all walks of life, and she credits her southern upbringing for both her warped sense of humor and her solid roots.

=== Accolades ===
Pierce turned her gift of storytelling into a successful comedic career, receiving more Gold and Platinum sales awards from the RIAA than any other female comedian in history. In addition to her 14 successful DVDs to date, she has also authored seven books, including the 2007 "Laughing in the Dark" (Simon & Schuster/Howard). She has written six books for children. She appears at venues big and small throughout the United States making audiences laugh with her ability to find the positivity in any situation. Pierce received five Daytime Emmy Awards nominations for her work co-hosting talk show Aspiring Women on the Total Living Network and her first television special, This Ain't Prettyville!, on the CMT Network. She is ranked among Pollstar's top-selling live performers, five of her DVD's have been certified Gold by the RIAA, signifying sales of more than 50,000 units, and three have been certified Platinum, signifying sales of more than 100,000 units.

=== Film ===
In October 2015, Pierce took her humor to the big screen with her first film Chonda Pierce: Laughing in the Dark, based on her personal struggle to overcome depression. The film is a behind-the-scenes journal chronicling Pierce's downward spiral dealing with the devastating loss of her mother, an estranged daughter, and the tragedy of her husband's battle with alcoholism and subsequent death, all during a span of three years. Yet she remarkably makes her way through the adversity, heart-wrenching loss and her own depression with the gift of humor. Pierce made the film in hopes it would serve as a vehicle to inspire others who may be hitting points of darkness and depression in their own lives. Laughing in the Dark opened October 27, 2015, to 858 screens and sold more than 100,000 tickets. It won the "Best Documentary" award at the 2016 Park City International Film Festival.

Chonda's second big screen documentary, Chonda Pierce: Enough, chronicled Chonda's continuing story of struggle, survival and faith. It explored what it means to be "enough" in the eyes of family, loved ones, God and even ourselves. The film has been received as an uplifting and inspirational answer to the internal and emotional struggles faced by many women. Enough opened April 25, 2017, to 1,510 screens and more than 100,000 tickets.

In her third big screen documentary, Unashamed, Chonda interviews celebrities and friends who have taken a stand for the gospel no matter the cost. Interviews included Newsboys front man Michael Tait, Governor Mike Huckabee, American Idol finalist and Christian recording artist Danny Gokey and television's Benham Brothers. The film opened May 7, 2019, on 818 screens and sold more than 80,000 tickets.

In August 2019, Chonda starred in her first scripted feature film, Roll with It. The movie, based on a script that Chonda originally wrote with her late husband, follows the humorous travails of a recently demoted, wise-cracking waitress whose faith, friends, and family pull her through personal crisis. The film is directed by Chris Dowling (Run the Race), financed by Endeavor Content and produced by Third Coast Content. The film was released on May 9, 2023, nationwide to over 750 theaters.

=== Television ===
In 2016, Chonda's stand-up comedy series debuted on the Dove Channel, called Chonda Pierce: Stand-Up for Families. The show is designed to encourage entire families to watch television together, and features a stand-up performance by Chonda and her guest comedians.

Pierce is a frequent guest on the famed Grand Ole Opry and has served as host of the Inspirational Country Music Awards and Christian Music Hall of Fame Awards and also co-hosted the GMA Dove Awards in 2012. She has also appeared on Entertainment Tonight, The View, Fox News, Wanda Sykes, Hallmark Home & Family, NY1, CNN's "History of Comedy", “How The States Got Their Shapes” and her comedy is regularly featured on XM and Sirius satellite radio. Variety raved about her ability to draw audiences for an encore performance for "Chonda Pierce: Laughing in the Dark."

Pierce received five Daytime Emmy nominations for her work co-hosting talk show “Aspiring Women” on the Total Living Network and her first television special, This Ain't Prettyville!, on the CMT Network.

== Philanthropy ==
Pierce has used her success to help others, and in 2006 founded Branches Recovery Center, which offers counseling and treatment to those with depression, anxiety, and addiction, regardless of their ability to pay.

== Discography ==
=== Books ===
- Second Row, Piano Side (1996)
- It's Always Darkest Before the Fun Comes Up (1998)
- Chonda Pierce on Her Soapbox (1999)
- I Can See Myself in His Eyeballs (2001)
- Roadkill on the Highway to Heaven (2006)
- Laughing in the Dark (Hardcover 2010, paperback 2015)
- Laughing in the Dark: A Bible Study On the Book of Job (2016)

=== Children's books ===
- Tales from the Ark - with David Pierce (2001)
- The Three Little Pigs (2002)
- Twinkle (2002)
- Tales from the Ark (2002)
- Twinkle - with David Pierce (2002)
- Tales from the Manger - with David Pierce (2004)

=== DVDs ===
- Chonda Pierce: Having a Girls' Night Out! (1998)
- Chonda Pierce: Live! From the Second Row, Piano Side (1998)
- Chonda Pierce...on Her Soapbox (1999)
- Chonda Pierce: Be Afraid... Be Very Afraid (2002)
- Chonda Pierce: Have I Got a Story for You (2003)
- Chonda Pierce: Four-Eyed Blonde (2004)
- Chonda Pierce: A Piece of My Mind (2006)
- Chonda Pierce "Best Bits" (2006)
- Chonda Pierce: Stayin' Alive... Laughing! (2007)
- Chonda Pierce: This Ain't Prettyville (2009)
- Chonda Pierce: Did I Say That Out Loud? (2010)
- Chonda Pierce: I'm Kind of a Big Deal (2011)
- Chonda Pierce: Girl Talk (2013)
- Chonda Pierce: Stand Up for Families (2016)

=== Documentary films ===
- Chonda Pierce: Laughing in the Dark (2015)
- Chonda Pierce: Enough (2017)
- Chonda Pierce: Unashamed (2019)
