= Country lawyer =

Attorney living and practicing primarily in a rural area or town

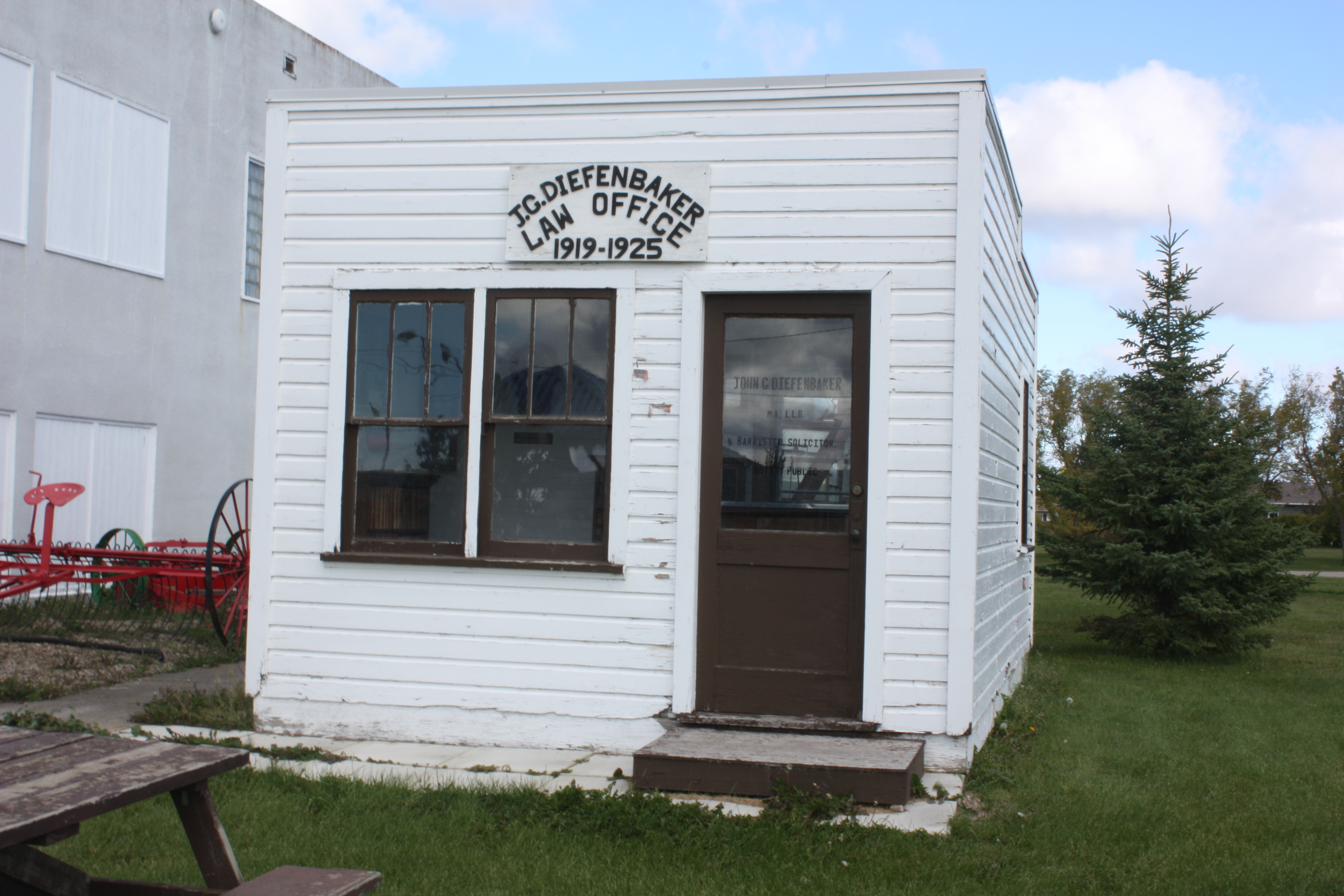
Recreation of future Canadian prime minister John Diefenbaker's first law office in Wakaw, Saskatchewan

In the United States and Canada, a country lawyer or county-seat lawyer is an attorney at law living and practicing primarily in a rural area or town, or an attorney pursuing a rural or small-town legal practice. In such areas, the county seat is an important center of government and home to the county courthouse, the forum for local criminal trials and civil litigation. The legal community may be small and close-knit (at the extreme, with only one who may be personally known to the community), and each individual attorney may handle a wide variety of legal matters as local needs dictate.

Historically, such an attorney may have been more likely to have joined the bar by reading law rather than attending school, and in modern times may have (or may be assumed to have) graduated from a lower tier legal program. (The professions of law and medicine had this in common in the 19th and early 20th centuries, as country doctors of that day sometimes trained by "reading medicine" with established doctors, effectively in an apprenticeship, with minimal or no medical school training and hospital residency.)

Consequently, the term carries with it certain connotations – both pejorative and complimentary – regarding the attorney's education, economic status, and even moral stature. The term may be applied to one's self, where it may indicate self-deprecation or humility. The term may also be used to describe a person who at one time practiced law in a humble setting, and later went on to do other things but (presumably) remained influenced by the country lawyer experience in later life and work.

In contrast, a city lawyer or big city lawyer would work in an urban area, one of many thousands of other attorneys specializing in a single practice area, possibly the graduate of an expensive and prestigious law school and the member of a law firm, potentially responsible to corporate clients whom they have never met in person, and, like most urban denizens, not personally acquainted with most of the other people living nearby. This term, too (especially big city lawyer), may carry pejorative connotations.

According to Francis Lyman Windolph in his 1938 book The Country Lawyer, the term turns more on the general nature of the attorney's practice than on the locality in which he practices:

Now the true test of the country lawyer is not the size or importance of the community in which he does his work, but rather the sort of work which he does and the sort of people for whom he does it. ... If a lawyer performs every sort of legal service for every sort of client – the poor and the lowly as well as the rich and the well born – he is, within my definition at least, a country lawyer, and no arbitrary distinction based on density of population or the like can make him anything else.

Robert H. Jackson offered his own description in his 1950 essay "The County-Seat Lawyer", focusing both on the attorney's education and social values:

He "read law" in the Commentaries of Blackstone and Kent and not by the case system. He resolved problems by what he called "first principles." He did not specialize, nor did he pick and choose clients. He rarely declined service to worthy ones because of inability to pay. ... He never quit. He could think of motions for every purpose under the sun, and he made them all. ... The law to him was like a religion, and its practice was more than a means of support; it was a mission. He was not always popular in his community, but he was respected. ... He "lived well, worked hard, and died poor." Often his name was in a generation or two forgotten. It was from this brotherhood that America has drawn its statesmen and its judges.

== Notable examples ==
The country lawyer's image – and mythology – has become that of advocate and protector of the common man. Notable American examples include:

- Andrew Jackson (1767–1845), frontier lawyer (1787–1796), 7th U.S. President (1829–1837)
- Abraham Lincoln (1809–1865), prairie lawyer, 16th U.S. President (1861–1865),
- Clarence Darrow (1857–1938), leading member of the American Civil Liberties Union
- Calvin Coolidge (1872–1933), country lawyer (1897–1916), Massachusetts State Legislator (1907–1908), Mayor of Northampton, Massachusetts (1910–1911), Massachusetts State Senator (1912–1915), President of the Massachusetts State Senate (1914–1915), Lt. Governor of Massachusetts (1916–1919), Governor of Massachusetts (1919–1921), U.S. Vice-President (1921–1923), 30th U.S. President (1923–1929)
- Robert H. Jackson (1892–1954), last U.S. Supreme Court justice (1941–1954) not to have graduated from law school, chief U.S. prosecutor at the Nuremberg Trials (1945–1946).
- Deane C. Davis (1900-1990), Governor of Vermont.
- Sam Ervin (1896–1985), Democratic U.S. Senator (1954–1974), and leading member of Congressional committees involved in discrediting McCarthy in 1954 and Nixon in 1974. (Ervin eventually graduated from Harvard Law School three years after being admitted to the bar, but still self-identified as "a simple country lawyer".)
- Joe Scarborough (born 1963), Republican congressman from Florida's 1st congressional district (1995–2001); co-host of Morning Joe on MSNBC.
- Strom Thurmond (1902–2003), Edgefield (South Carolina) Town and County Attorney (1930–1938), Circuit Judge, Governor of South Carolina (1947–1951), United States Senator (1956–2003), Presidential candidate (1948).
- Bobby Lee Cook (1925–2021), defense attorney from Summerville, Georgia, reputed to have been the inspiration for the television character Ben Matlock

Notable Canadian examples include:

- John A. Macdonald (1815–1891), 1st Prime Minister of Canada (1867–1873)
- John Sparrow David Thompson (1845–1894), 4th Prime Minister of Canada (1892–1894)
- Robert Borden (1854–1937), 9th Prime Minister of Canada (1911–1920)
- John Diefenbaker (1895–1979), 13th Prime Minister of Canada (1957–1963)
