= Pollyanna McIntosh =

Scottish-born actress (b. 1979)

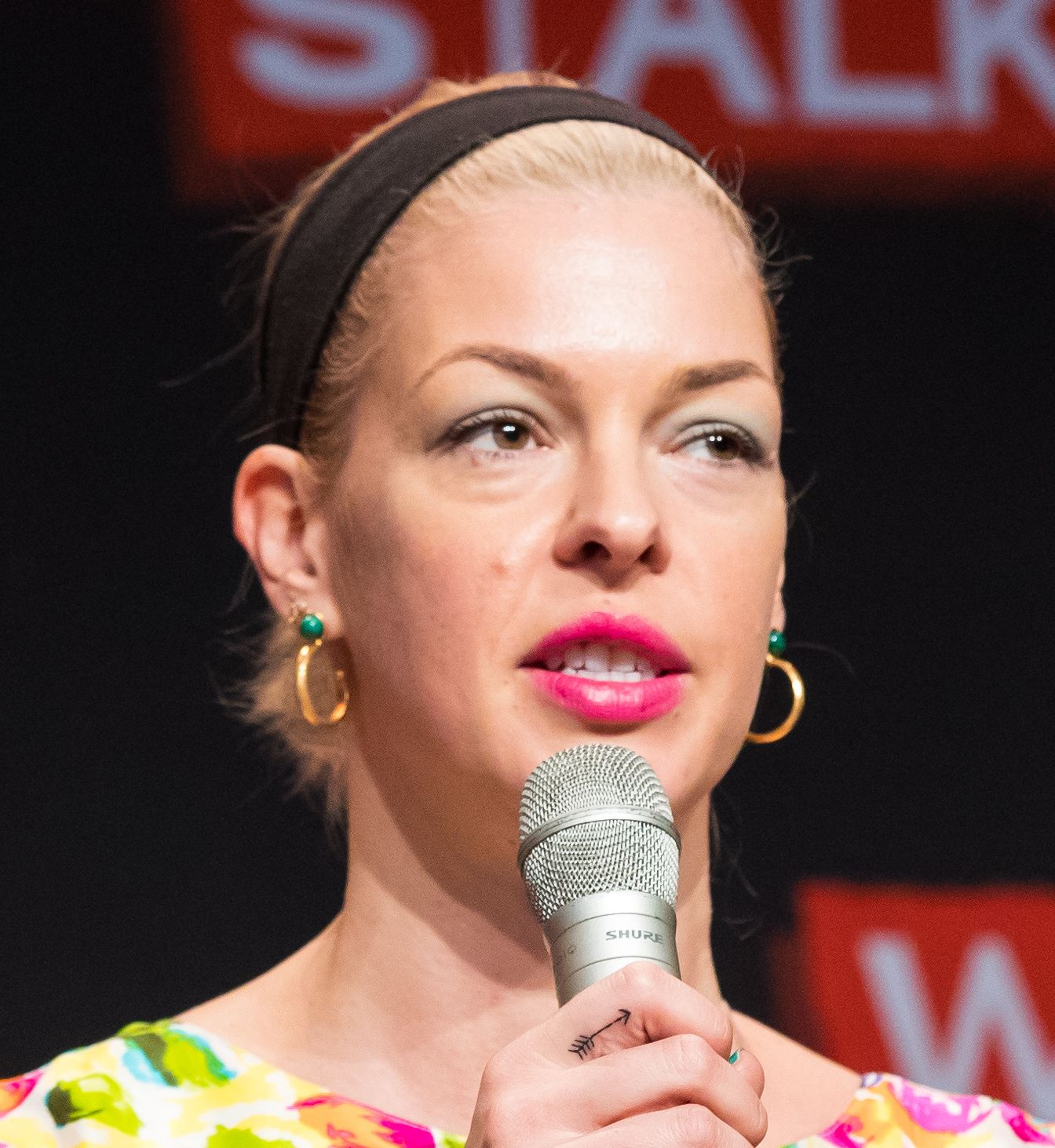
- McIntosh at Walker Stalker Con
- Born: 15 March 1979 (age 47); Dunbartonshire, Scotland
- Occupations: Actress, director
- Years active: 2005–present
- Spouse: Grant Show (m. 2004; div. 2011) Bobcat Goldthwait (m. 2024)

Pollyanna McIntosh (born 15 March 1979) is a Scottish actress and director known for her roles in films Exam (2009), The Woman (2011), Let Us Prey (2014), the first season of Joe R. Lansdale's Hap and Leonard (2016), and social issue horror film Darlin' (2019) which she wrote, directed and starred in. McIntosh also starred as Jadis in The Walking Dead franchise (2017–2024), Queen Ælfgifu of Denmark in the Netflix series Vikings: Valhalla (2022), and voices Kris in the Max adult animation series Scavengers Reign (2023).

== Biography ==
Pollyanna McIntosh was born in Dunbartonshire, Scotland. From ages two to five, she and her family lived in Portugal. They then lived in Edinburgh before moving to Colombia. Her father was an actor, but he became a businessman working for a thread company so that he could spend more time with his family. McIntosh attended St. George's School for Girls.

McIntosh debuted as an actress aged 16, appearing in London's independent film and theatre as both an actress and director. In 2004, she moved to Los Angeles and directed the stage production The Woolgatherer with Anne Dudek and Dyan David Fisher. In 2005, she received her first film role in Headspace. In 2009, she starred in Exam and was nominated for both Best Work of a Rookie at the BAFTA Awards and the Raindance Award at the British Independent Film Awards. In 2011, she was cast in the film The Woman for which she was nominated for Best Actress at the Fangoria Chainsaw Awards. In 2016, she was cast as Angel in the SundanceTV series Hap and Leonard and was cast the following year as Jadis ("Anne") in a starring role on The Walking Dead. Her debut feature as a script writer and director, the social issue horror film Darlin', premiered at the South-by-Southwest festival in Austin, Texas in March 2019.

McIntosh also pursues a career in fashion and works in support of young people's charity the Joshua Nolan Foundation.

She was married to actor Grant Show from 2004 to 2011. She married Bobcat Goldthwait in 2024.

== Filmography ==
=== Film ===
Year	Title	Role	Notes
2005	Headspace	Stacy	
2007	9 Lives of Mara	Mara / Maria	
2007	Sex and Death 101	Thumper (#64)	
2009	All Ages Night	Varela	
2009	Exam	Brunette	
2009	Land of the Lost	Pakuni Woman	
2009	Offspring	The Woman	
2010	Burke & Hare	Mary	
2011	The Woman	The Woman	Sequel to Offspring
2012	I Do	Catherine	
2012	The Famous Joe Project	Nova	
2012	Prevertere		
2012	Carlos Spills the Beans	Hot Girl	
2013	Blue Dream	Amanda	
2013	Noise Matters	Rose	
2013	Love Eternal	Naomi Clarke	
2013	Filth	Size Queen	
2013	Como Quien No Quiere La Cosa	Missis Terrier	
2014	Let Us Prey	PC. Rachel Heggie	
2014	White Settlers	Sarah	
2014	The Herd	Doctor	
2015	Tales of Halloween	Bobbie	Segment: "Ding Dong"
2016	Native	Matilda	
2019	Darlin'	The Woman	Sequel to The Woman. Also writer and director
2019	Deathcember	Radio Host (voice)	Also director
2020	Revenge Ride	Trigga	
2023	Double Blind	Dr. Burke	

=== Television ===
Year	Title	Role	Notes
2007	Bats: Human Harvest	Katya Simonova	Television film
2009	Taggart	Morag Shearer	Episode: "Cold Reader"
2011	Dani's House	Mystery Astronaut	Episode: "One Small Step for Sam"
2012	Book Club	Sexy Yoga Student	Episode: "Book Club Reads... 'Cougar Enchantments' by Del Mari Fuentes"
2013	Waterloo Road	Olivia McAllister	Episode: "Bad Boy"
2013	Bob Servant Independent	Philippa Edwards	5 episodes
2013	Casualty	Georgia Bates	Episode: "Bedside Manners"
2013	M.I. High	Crime Minster / Jenny Lane	13 episodes
2016	Hap and Leonard	Angel	6 episodes
2017	The Last Tycoon	Vera Chase	Episode: "A More Perfect Union"
2017–2018	The Walking Dead	Jadis Stokes / Anne	Recurring (season 7); Also starring (seasons 8–9); 15 episodes
2017–2018	Talking Dead	Herself	3 episodes
2019	Lodge 49	Clara	Recurring (season 2)
2020	Chilling Adventures of Sabrina	Metatron	Episode: "Chapter Thirty-Three: Deus Ex Machina"
2021	The Walking Dead: World Beyond	Jadis Stokes / Anne	Main role (season 2)
2022–2024	Vikings: Valhalla	Ælfgifu of Northampton	Recurring role
2023	Scavengers Reign	Kris	6 episodes
2024	The Walking Dead: The Ones Who Live	Jadis Stokes / Anne	Main role
2024	Outer Banks	Dalia	Recurring role

=== Video games ===
Year	Title	Voice role	Notes
2010	Dante's Inferno	Bella	
2017	Middle-earth: Shadow of War	Shelob	
2023	Forspoken	Tanta Prave	

== Awards and nominations ==
Year	Award	Category	work	Result	Ref.
2011	Fright Meter Awards	Best Actress	The Woman	Won	
2011	Toronto After Dark Film Festival	Best Leading Actress	The Woman	Won	
2012	Fangoria Chainsaw Awards	Fangoria Chainsaw Award for Best Actress	The Woman	Nominated	
2017	Nightmares Film Festival	Best Actress Feature	Blood Ride	Nominated	
2025	Academy of Science Fiction, Fantasy and Horror Films	Best Supporting Actress in a Television Series	The Walking Dead: The Ones Who Live	Nominated	
