= Jack Ketchum =

American novelist (1946–2018)

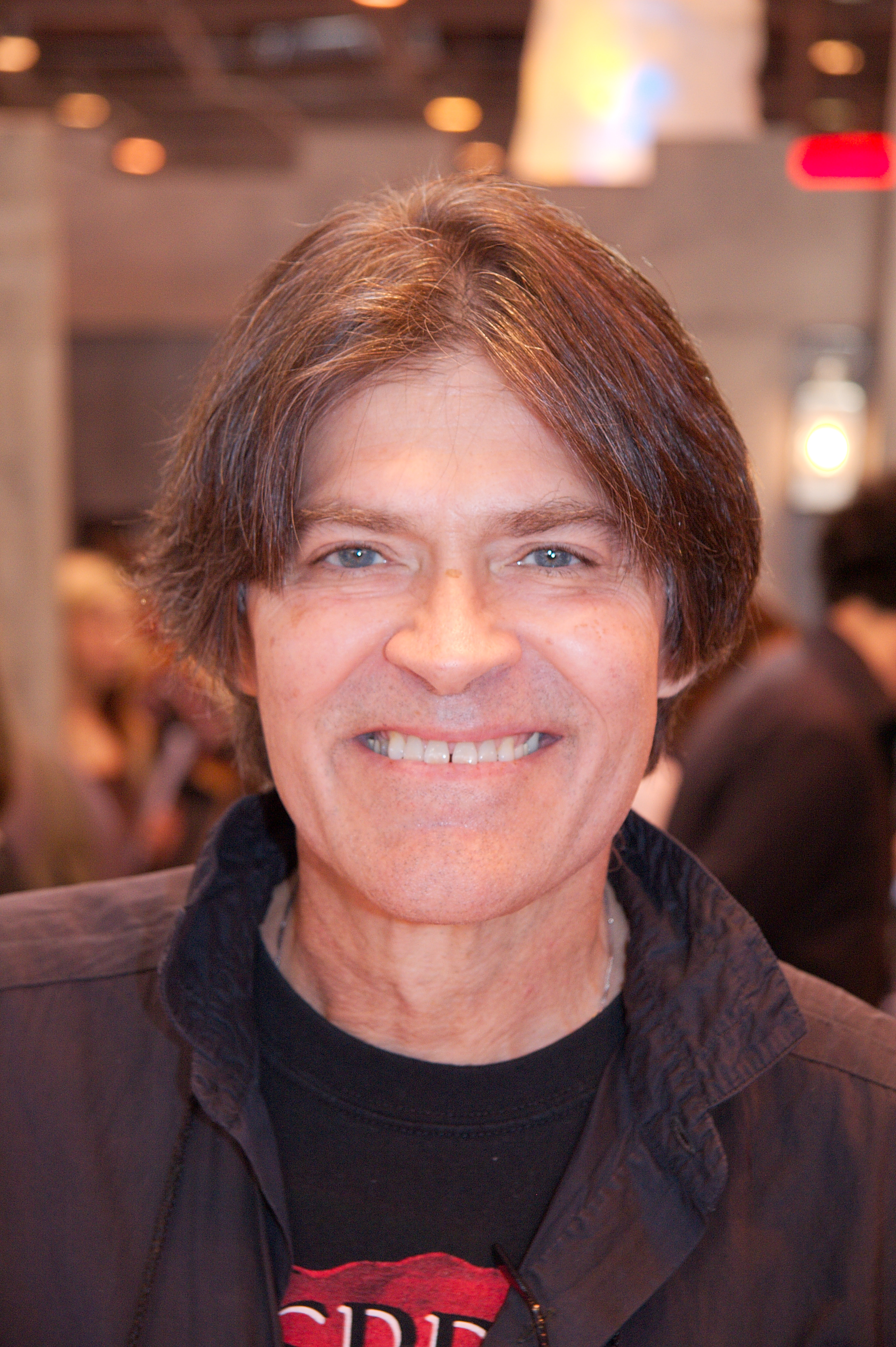
- Ketchum at a book fair in Paris, France, in March 2009
- Born: Dallas William Mayr; November 10, 1946; Livingston, New Jersey, U.S.
- Died: January 24, 2018 (aged 71); New York City, U.S.
- Education: Emerson College (BA)
- Occupations: Writer, filmmaker
- Writing career
- Pen name: Jack Ketchum, Jerzy Livingston
- Genres: Horror fiction, thriller, Western fiction, Dark fantasy, Genre fiction
- Notable works: Off Season, The Girl Next Door, Red, The Crossings, and "The Box" (short story)
- Notable awards: Bram Stoker Award (1994), (2000), (2003 twice); World Horror Convention Grand Master Award (2011)

Dallas William Mayr (November 10, 1946 – January 24, 2018), better known by his pen name Jack Ketchum, was an American horror fiction author. He was the recipient of four Bram Stoker Awards and three further nominations. His novels included Off Season, Offspring, and Red, the latter two of which were adapted to film. In 2011, Ketchum received the World Horror Convention Grand Master Award for outstanding contribution to the horror genre.

== Biography ==
=== Early life and education ===
Ketchum was born in Livingston, New Jersey, as the only child to German immigrant parents. His father, Dallas William Mayr (1908–1997), served in the artillery during World War II and his mother, Evelyn Fahner Mayr (1915–1987), was an accountant and office manager. He earned a Bachelor of Arts degree in English from Emerson College in Boston, Massachusetts, and later taught at the high-school level in Brookline, Massachusetts, for two years.

=== Early years ===
A onetime actor, teacher, literary agent, lumber salesman, and soda jerk, Ketchum credited his childhood love of Elvis Presley, dinosaurs, and horror for getting him through his formative years. He began making up stories at a young age and explained that he spent much time in his room, or in the woods near his house, down by the brook: '[m]y interests [were] books, comics, movies, rock 'n roll, show tunes, TV, dinosaurs [...] pretty much any activity that didn't demand too much socializing, or where I could easily walk away from socializing'. He would make up stories using his plastic soldiers, knights, and dinosaurs as the characters. He was also big on Halloween, and his mother, being '[...] pretty good with the sewing machine [...]', ensured young Ketchum had an authentic costume; his favorites were Peter Pan and Superman. Ketchum further expressed an early interest in horror films such as Nosferatu and the classic Universal Monsters such as The Hunchback of Notre Dame and The Phantom of the Opera.

Later, in his teen years, Ketchum was befriended by Robert Bloch, author of Psycho, who became his mentor. He supported Ketchum's work, just as his work was supported by his own mentor, H. P. Lovecraft. Ketchum's relationship with Bloch lasted until Bloch's death in 1994. Ketchum's parents were the owners of a luncheonette and soda fountain where Jack worked to support his writing, as a short-order cook during the day and a soda jerk after dark.

Ketchum worked many different jobs before completing his first novel (1980's controversial Off Season), including acting as agent for novelist Henry Miller at Scott Meredith Literary Agency, a pivotal point in his career; his encounter with Miller at his home in the Pacific Palisades is one of the subjects of his memoir in Book of Souls. He also sold articles and stories—both fiction and nonfiction—to various rock 'n roll and men's magazines to supplement his income. His decision to eventually concentrate on novel writing was partly fueled by a preference for work that offered stability and longevity.

Throughout his life, Ketchum read widely, authors such as Robert Bloch, Charles Bukowski, Jim Harrison, Franz Douskey and Ernest Hemingway. Apart from his experience as a short-story and magazine article writer, reading was the essential tool in influencing Ketchum's craft.

=== The Jerzy Livingston years ===
Before Ketchum turned to novel writing, he sold a prolific number of short fiction and articles to magazines. His initial pen name, Jerzy Livingston, came about during this period. Because he often had more than one piece published in a specific magazine, he would use his own name for the first byline and then adopt a pseudonym for the others. He came from Livingston, New Jersey, and at the time, had been reading work by the author Jerzy Kosiński: "I liked the in-joke. Hence, Jerzy Livingston." he explained. One of his best-known characters while writing as Jerzy Livingstone is Stroup, a play on Proust: Stroup, however, had zero understanding of people, even himself. Ketchum refers to Stroup as "[a] boozer. a loser. a homophobe. A highly questionable friend and unreliable lover. Misogynist as hell and for the most part proud of it." Stroup is the exact opposite of Marcel Proust, whom Ketchum calls "[a]rguably the most sensitive writer in history". Stroup appeared in the men's magazine Swank. He was resurrected in the tale "Sheep Meadow Story" that formed part of the book Triage (2001), a collection with Richard Laymon and Edward Lee. His exploits can be found collected in Broken on the Wheel of Sex: The Jerzy Livingston Years (2007).

=== Death ===
Ketchum died of cancer on January 24, 2018, in New York City at the age of 71.

== Awards and nominations ==
- The Box (1994)—Bram Stoker Award for Best Short Story
- Right to Life (1999)—Bram Stoker Award nominee for Best Long Fiction
- Gone (2000)—Bram Stoker Award for Best Short Fiction
- The Lost (2001)—Bram Stoker Award nominee for Best Novel
- The Haunt (2001)—Bram Stoker Award nominee for Best Short Fiction
- Peaceable Kingdom (2003)—Bram Stoker Award for Best Collection
- Closing Time (2003)—Bram Stoker Award for Best Long Fiction
- World Horror Convention Grand Master Award (2011)
- I'm Not Sam (2012)—Bram Stoker Award nominee for Best Long Fiction (with Lucky McKee)
- I'm Not Sam (2012)—Shirley Jackson Award nominee for Best Novella (with Lucky McKee)
- Bram Stoker Award for Lifetime Achievement (2014)

== Bibliography ==
=== Books ===
Title	Year	Type	Publisher	Notes
Off Season	1981	novel	Ballantine Books	
Hide and Seek	1984	novel	Ballantine Books	
Cover	1987	novel	Grand Central Publishing	
She Wakes	1989	novel	Berkley Publishing Group	
The Girl Next Door	1989	novel	Grand Central Publishing	
Offspring	1991	novel	Diamond Books	The sequel to Off Season
Joyride	1994	novel	Berkley Publishing Group	Released as Road Kill in the UK
Stranglehold	1995	novel	Berkley Publishing Group	Released as Only Child in the UK
Red	1995	novel	Headline Book Publishing	
Ladies' Night	1997	novel	Silver Salamander Press	Reworked from unpublished Ballantine release
The Exit at Toledo Blade Boulevard	1998	collection	Obsidian Books	Short story collection
Right to Life	1998	novella	Cemetery Dance Publications	
The Lost	2001	novel	Leisure Books	
Peaceable Kingdom	2003	collection	Leisure Books	Short story collection
The Crossings	2003	novel	Cemetery Dance Publications	
Sleep Disorder	2003	collection	Gauntlet Press	Co-written with Edward Lee
Broken on the Wheel of Sex	2006	collection	Overlook Connection Press	Stories previously written under the pseudonym Jerzy Livingston
Weed Species	2006	novella	Cemetery Dance Publications	
Closing Time and Other Stories	2007	collection	Gauntlet Press	Short story collection
Old Flames	2008	novel	Leisure Books	
Book of Souls	2008	novella	Bloodletting Press	
The Woman	2010	novel	Leisure Books	Co-written with Lucky McKee
I'm Not Sam	2012	novel	Sinister Grin Press	Co-written with Lucky McKee
Triptych	2012	collection	Crossroad Press	Collection of plays
Notes from the Cat House	2013	collection	Crossroad Press	Collection of poems
The Secret Life of Souls	2016	novel	Pegasus Books	Co-written with Lucky McKee
Gorilla in My Room	2017	collection	Cemetery Dance Publications	Short story collection

== Filmography ==
=== Writer ===
- The Lost (2006)
- The Girl Next Door (2007)
- Red (2008)
- Offspring (2009)
- The Woman (2011)
- Mail Order (short, 2011)
- Olivia (short, 2013)
- XX ("The Box" segment, 2017)

=== Actor ===
- The Lost (2006) as Teddy Panik
- Header (2006) as State Trooper No. 2
- The Girl Next Door (2007) as Carnival worker
- Red (2008) as Bartender
- Offspring (2009) as Max Joseph

=== Self ===
- The Cult of Ichi (2007)
- The Making of The Girl Next Door (2007)
- Dark Dreamers (2011)
- Inside the Plain Brown Wrapping (2013)

== See also ==
- List of horror fiction writers
- Splatterpunk
