= Off Season (novel) =

Novel by Jack Ketchum

- Cover of the first edition
- Author: Jack Ketchum
- Language: English
- Genre: Horror
- Publisher: Ballantine Books
- Publication date: 1980
- Publication place: United States
- Media type: Print
- Followed by: Offspring

Off Season is a horror novel written by Jack Ketchum and initially published by Ballantine Books in 1980. It was Ketchum's first novel and was partially based upon the legend of Sawney Bean, which also inspired Wes Craven's 1977 cult classic horror film The Hills Have Eyes.

When the novel was released, many well-known publications attacked its depictions of extreme violence. Critical reaction to it was so strong that Ballantine stepped back from supporting the novel. Despite initially strong sales, the publisher decided to withdraw it from circulation after the first printings were sold out. In 1999, the novel was picked up for re-publication by Cemetery Dance Publications and was released in an "unexpurgated edition" that featured some of the gore that Ballantine initially made Ketchum trim as well as his original, bleaker ending.

== Plot ==
A group of six friends from New York City rent a house in Dead River, Maine for a weeklong vacation. The day they arrive a woman is fished from the ocean, claiming she was ambushed by a group of feral children. Hidden for years from civilization, a clan of cannibalistic, inbred savages stalk the area for whatever meat they can find.

Carla arrives at the rental house to clean a day before the other five friends arrive. The house is well off the beaten path, tucked away and private. By night an unnaturally large man watches through the window.

The local sheriff is alerted to a woman having been found in the ocean with distinct, whip-like wounds on her back. The Jane Doe is unconscious till the next day when she reports that she exited her vehicle to help a little girl who was wandering in the road past midnight. This was the beginning of a trap in which she was surrounded by ghastly children who chased her with switches and attempted to kill her. This report resonates with the sheriff, reminding him of a tale the local drunk tells. After interviewing the drunk the sheriff is certain danger is present, sparking an in-depth investigation.

Later that evening, the five friends arrive, most notably Carla's sister Marjie and Carla's ex-boyfriend Nick. As they settle in for the night the living room window bursts open. Carla's boyfriend, Jim, is killed, and Carla is dragged through the window. The four remaining friends startle and soon find themselves surrounded by an unknown enemy. They soon realize, as Carla is killed, cooked, and eaten, that their enemy is a family of cannibals.

An attempt to escape fails as the four friends frantically sprint to one of their cars, only to realize both have been tampered with. Nick, however, remembers that Jim had secretly brought a gun with him and grabs it from the trunk. Marjie, Nick, and Nick's girlfriend Laura make it back into the house safely, but Marjie's boyfriend Dan is killed.

Soon after the escape attempt the house is broken into by the cannibals. Marjie and Nick escape to the attic, but Laura is catatonic and left to her own devices downstairs. Realization dawns on Marjie and Nick that their barricade won't hold, so Marjie attempts an escape through the only window by dropping to the ground. She is soon taken captive with Laura. The cannibals breach the attic and find it empty. Believing Nick escaped into the woods, one of the cannibalistic men sets out to find him. Nick, now on the roof, watches the group leave with his friends, hopeful he can track them.

The police arrive shortly after, brought to the location by the billowing smoke from the fire that cooked Carla. There is no one alive at the house, but the carnage is fresh, and back-up is called. When they arrive they set out, following their trails. Upon arrival on the beach, a gun is heard going off, causing the police to rush towards it.

Following the cannibals to a cave, Nick finds Marjie inside, badly beaten and partially eaten; Laura is butchered next to the fire. The cannibals attack but he is able to kill them, terrifying the others into retreat.

In the haste both groups flee with the cops running directly into the fleeing cannibals and a feverish skirmish ensues, leading to the death of many of the police officers and the rest of the cannibals. Amidst the chaos of the fight, a panic-driven police officer shoots Nick, killing him.

Marjie barely holds onto the last bit of life she has left as paramedics arrive and take her to the hospital. She must now contemplate all the terrible actions she took in order to survive.

== Background ==
Ketchum's influences for the novel included the films Night of the Living Dead and The Texas Chain Saw Massacre, as well as the novels How to Survive in the Wilderness and Mountain Man. Ketchum chose Maine as the setting based on his personal experiences, having spent two seasons of summer stock in Cape Elizabeth, where he found the terrain to be isolating.
