= Latvian animation =

The Baltic European country of Latvia has produced animation since the 1930s, with increased international attention to Latvian animation since the 2010s. Due to the comparatively small size of the Latvian animation industry, Latvian animators have participated in animation collaborations with studios and animators from other countries.

== Funding ==
In the 21st century, the Latvian Ministry of Culture provides funding to some Latvian animation studios.

== Style ==
Latvian animation developed in the wider context of Eastern European animation, with influences drawn from Russian animation in particular.

Early Latvian animations were characterized by puppetry and stop motion, as seen in the first professional Latvian animation, Arnold Burovs' 1996 Ki-ke-ri-gū!/Cock-a-doodle-doo!

Many Latvian animators have expressed interest in establishing "a stylistic continuity" and a specifically Latvian style of animation, rather than copying styles pioneered by other countries. This uniquely Latvian style may include a "penchant for surrealist landscapes and bizarre metaphors". Latvian animator Signe Baumane has stated that "Latvian filmmakers operate on a notion of visual metaphors, some of which translate outride of the Latvian context, but some of which don't...American films are more literal".

For much of Latvian history, the country offered no animation programs in schools. As such, many Latvian animators have been self-taught and/or have come from fine art backgrounds. Some Latvian animators have studied in Estonia; the two countries have been involved in multiple animation collaborations.

== History ==
In the 1930s, graphic artist Oļģerts Ābelīte and caricaturist Ernests Rirdāns experimented with the animation technique.

In 1969, a two-person animation team (Roze Stiebra and Ansis Bērziņš) was established by Latvian Television. Stiebra worked as a writer and director, and Bērziņš as a camera operator and (after 1972) a director. Their first film was titled Lietaina diena (English: Rainy Day). The team released an average of two short films each year, utilizing stop motion and materials like cardboard, canvas, celluloid, fabric, and application paper. Many of the films were centered on a poem, song, and a piece of Latvian literature. The first hand-drawn animated Latvian film, Kabata (The Pocket) was created in 1983. In the late 1980s, the Latvian Television animation team, comprising both puppet animators and hand-drawn animators, split off to form their own studio, Dauka, under Riga Film Studio.

The first full-length animated film produced in Latvia was Dauka's Ness un Nesija (1991). In 1992, the puppet animators of Dauka left, leaving the studio to produce only hand-drawn animated films. The puppet animators formed Animacijas Brigade. These two studios were the dominant animation producers in the country until 1995, when Rija Studio was established.

The first computer-animated Latvian film, Aija Bley's Eza Kazocins, was released in 2005. In 2007, the first Latvian animated documentary film, Edmund Jansons' Little Bird's Diary, was released.

In 2010, the country's first animation studio, Dauka, closed. Latvian animation has seen further attention internationally since the 2010s. The 2024 independently animated film Flow, a Latvian, Belgian, and French co-production, won multiple awards, including the 2025 Academy Award for Best Animated Feature, the country's first Academy Award. It was also the first Latvian film to win the Best Animated Feature Film; the statuette would later be put on display at the Latvian National Museum of Art. In the aftermath of the film's win, the Latvian government pledged additional funding for animation competitions within Latvia.

== Notable Latvian animation ==
=== Television series ===
- Fantadroms, cartoon series (Studio Dauka; 1985–1995)

=== Short films ===
- Lietaina diena (Latvian Television, 1969)
- Zelta Sietins (Latvian Television, 1975; 9 minute duration); directed by Roze Stiebra; based on three poems by Rainis
- Skudrina Tipa (Latvian Television, 1976; 9 minute duration); written and directed by Ansis Bērziņš
- Bimini (1981); based on Heinrich Heine's poem Bimini
- Kabata (Latvian Television, 1983)
- Veca Setnieka Piedzivojums (1985; 20 minute duration); directed by Arnolds Burovs

=== Films ===
- Ness un Nesija (Dauka, 1991)
- Kirikou and the Sorceress, animated film; French, Luxembourgish, and Hungarian co-production (Rija Studio, 1998)
- The Triplets of Belleville, animated film; French, Canadian, English, and Belgian co-production (Rija Studio, 2003)
- Lotte from Gadgetville, animated film; Estonian co-production (2006)
- Rocks in My Pockets, adult animated film; American co-production (2014)
- Away, animated film (2019)
- Jacob, Mimmi and the Talking Dogs, animated film; Polish co-production (2019)
- My Favorite War, animated documentary; Norwegian co-production (2020)
- My Love Affair with Marriage, animated adult film (2022)
- Flow, animated film; French and Belgian co-production (2024)
- Dog of God, animated adult film; American and German co-production (2025)

== Notable Latvian animators ==
- Signe Baumane (born 1964)
- Matīss Kaža (born 1995)
- Roze Stiebra (1942–2024)
- Gints Zilbalodis (born 1994)

== See also ==
- Cinema of Latvia
