= List of Latvian submissions for the Academy Award for Best International Feature Film =

Best International Feature Film submissions from Latvia

Highlights
- Debut: 1992
- Submissions: 17
- Nominations: 1
- Oscar winners: 0

Latvia has submitted films for the Academy Award for Best International Feature Film (Note: Named "Best Foreign Language Film" prior to April 2019) since 1992, few months after restoring independence from the Soviet Union. The award is given annually by the Academy of Motion Picture Arts and Sciences to a feature-length motion picture produced outside the United States that contains primarily non-English dialogue, and was first presented at the 1956.

As of 2026, Latvia was nominated only once, for Flow (2024), which won the Academy Award for Best Animated Feature.

== Submissions ==
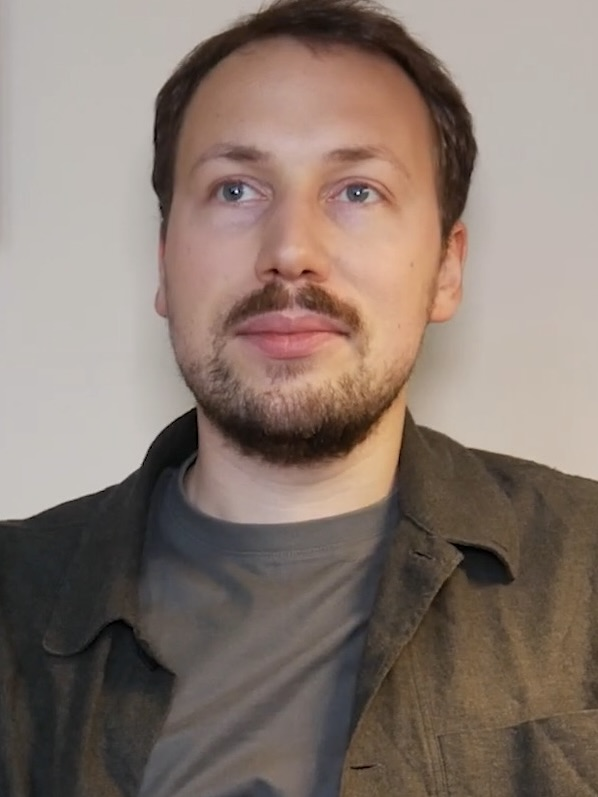
Gints Zilbalodis's animated film Flow was the first Latvian film to be nominated.

The academy selection committee reviews all submissions for this award, and votes the five candidates via secret ballot voting. A panel works on behalf of the National Film Centre of Latvia (NFCL). (Note: Latvian: Latvijas Nacionālais Kino Centrs) As of 2022, it consists of Latvian Filmmakers Union (Note: Latvian: Latvijas Kinematogrāfistu Savienība) chairperson Ieva Romanova, Ministry of Culture secretary Dace Vilsone, critic Kristīne Simsone, filmmaker Dace Pūce, film producer Alise Ģelze, and animator Edmunds Jansons. Dita Rietuma, film historian and director of the NFCL, is head of the panel since 2020. They would hold a meeting to decide on the submission, and would often announce the reason for the final decision. Previous members include film historian Viktors Freibergs, director and Latvian Academy of Culture [lv] (Note: Latvian: Latvijas Kultūras Akadēmija) professor Dāvis Sīmanis, chairwoman of the Latvian Cinematographers Union (Note: Latvian: Latvijas Kinematogrāfistu Savienības) Zane Balčus, chairman of the Baltic Sea Documentary Film Forum Zane Balčus and Dzintars Dreibergs, as well as film producer Uldis Cekulis.

In 1992, they sent their first-ever film for consideration, a comedy film titled The Child of Man, written and directed by Jānis Streičs. The only filmmaker with two submitted films is Viesturs Kairišs, with The Chronicles of Melanie (2016) and January (2022).

Latvia's first nominated film was the animation Flow (2024), directed by Gints Zilbalodis, which won the Academy Award for Best Animated Feature, marking the first fully independent animation to do so.

All the films submitted are primary in Latvian, with the exception of Flow, which features no dialogue. Below is a list of the films that have been submitted by Latvia for the award, listed by year and the respective Academy Awards ceremony.

Year (Ceremony)	Film title used in nomination	Original title	Director(s)	Result
1992 (65th)	The Child of Man (Note: The first film and only Latvian submission to use Latgalian dialect throughout, with the film set in the Latgale region of Latvia)	Cilvēka bērns	Jānis Streičs	Not nominated
2008 (81st)	Defenders of Riga	Rīgas sargi	Aigars Grauba [lv]	Not nominated
2010 (83rd)	Hong Kong Confidential	Amaya	Māris Martinsons	Not nominated
2012 (85th)	Gulf Stream Under the Iceberg	Golfa straume zem ledus kalna	Jevgēņijs Paškēvičs [lv]	Not nominated
2013 (86th)	Mother, I Love You	Mammu, es tevi mīlu	Jānis Nords [lv]	Not nominated
2014 (87th)	Rocks in My Pockets	Akmeņi manās kabatās	Signe Baumane	Not nominated
2015 (88th)	Modris		Juris Kursietis	Not nominated
2016 (89th)	Dawn	Ausma	Laila Pakalniņa	Not nominated
2017 (90th)	The Chronicles of Melanie	Melānijas hronika	Viestur Kairish	Not nominated
2018 (91st)	To Be Continued	Turpinājums	Ivars Seleckis [lv]	Not nominated
2019 (92nd)	The Mover	Tēvs Nakts	Dāvis Sīmanis Jr. [lv]	Not nominated
2020 (93rd)	Blizzard of Souls	Dvēseļu putenis	Dzintars Dreibergs [lv]	Not nominated
2021 (94th)	The Pit	Bedre	Dace Pūce	Not nominated
2022 (95th)	January	Janvāris	Viesturs Kairišs	Not nominated
2023 (96th)	My Freedom	Mana brīvība	Ilze Kunga-Melgaile	Not nominated
2024 (97th)	Flow	Straume	Gints Zilbalodis	Nominated
2025 (98th)	Dog of God	Dieva suns	Lauris Ābele and Raitis Ābele	Not nominated
2026 (99th)	Ulya	Uļa	Viesturs Kairišs	Pending

== Shortlisted films ==
Year	Films
2008	Amatieris · Midsummer Madness
2010	Rūdolfs' Inheritance
2011	~~Return of Sergeant Lapins~~
2012	Kolka Cool · People Out There · Mona
2013	Dream Team 1935 · Mushroomers
2014	Then It's Hi! Hi! Hee!
2015	The Lesson
2016	Exiled · Mellow Mud · Under the Sun
2017	Swingers
2018	Baltic Tribes · Bille · Foam at the Mouth · The Foundation of Criminal Excellence · The Pagan King · Paradise 89 · Van Goghs
2019	Jacob, Mimmi and the Talking Dogs · Oleg
2020	The Sign Painter · What Silent Gerda Knows
2021	In the Mirror · The Year Before the War
2022	My Love Affair with Marriage · Neon Spring · Sisters · Soviet Milk
2023	Soviet Milk
2024	Maria's Silence
2025	The Exalted · In The Land That Sings

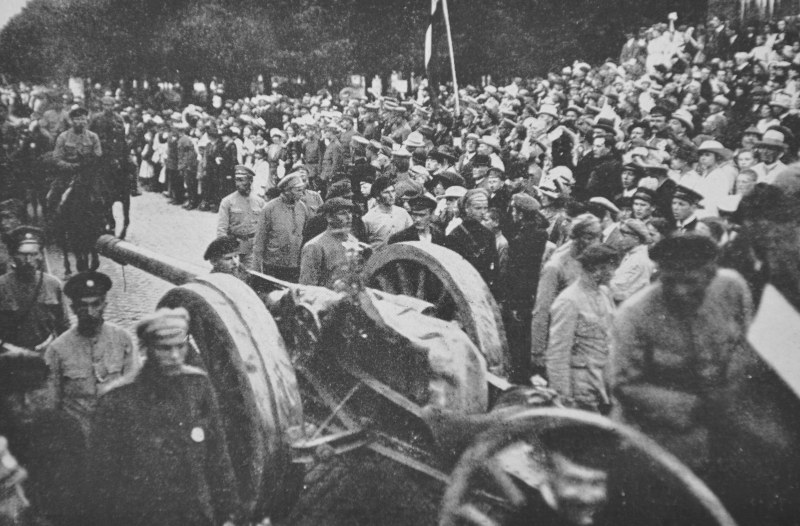
Two submissions, Defenders of Riga (2007) and Blizzard of Souls (2019), are set during the Latvian War of Independence.

== See also ==
- List of countries by number of Academy Awards for Best International Feature Film
- Cinema of Latvia
- List of Lithuanian submissions for the Academy Award for Best International Feature Film (neighbouring country with no nominations)
