= List of accolades received by Flow =

Flow accolades
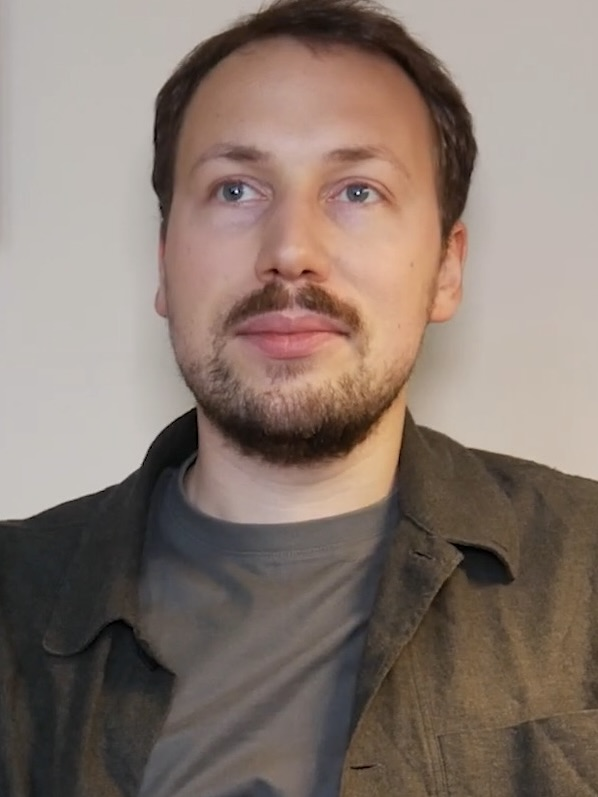
- Gints Zilbalodis received several awards and nominations for his direction, screenplay, and musical score.
Accolades
Award	Wins	Nominations
Academy Awards	1	2
Alliance of Women Film Journalists	1	2
American Cinema Editors	0	1
Annecy International Animation Film Festival	4	5
Annie Awards	2	3
The Astra Awards	0	2
Austin Film Critics Association	0	2
Bandung Film Festival	1	1
Boston Society of Film Critics	1	1
British Academy Film Awards	0	2
Cannes Film Festival	0	1
César Awards	1	1
Chicago Film Critics Association	1	1
Critics' Choice Movie Awards	0	2
Dallas–Fort Worth Film Critics Association	0	1
Dorian Awards	1	1
European Film Academy	1	1
European Film Awards	1	2
Florida Film Critics Circle	1	2
Golden Globe Awards	1	1
Golden Trailer Awards	1	2
Goya Awards	0	1
Guadalajara International Film Festival	1	1
Independent Spirit Awards	1	1
International Cinephile Society Awards	1	1
Lielais Kristaps	6	8
Los Angeles Film Critics Association	1	1
Lumière Awards	1	1
National Board of Review	1	1
New York Film Critics Circle	1	1
New York Film Critics Online	1	1
Online Film Critics Society	1	1
Ottawa International Animation Festival	1	1
Polish Film Awards	0	1
San Diego Film Critics Society	1	1
San Francisco Film Critics Circle	1	1
Satellite Awards	0	1
Seattle Film Critics Society	0	2
Seville European Film Festival	3	3
St. Louis Film Critics Association	0	1
Toronto Film Critics Association	1	1
Washington D.C. Area Film Critics Association	0	2

Totals (Note: Certain award groups do not simply award one winner. They acknowledge several different recipients, have runners-up, and have third place. Since this is a specific recognition and is different from losing an award, runner-up mentions are considered wins in this award tally. For simplification and to avoid errors, each award in this list has been presumed to have had a prior nomination.)
- Wins: 41
- Nominations: 69

Flow (Latvian: Straume) is a 2024 animated fantasy adventure film directed by Gints Zilbalodis, written and produced by Zilbalodis and Matīss Kaža. A Latvian, French and Belgian co-production, it features no dialogue and follows a cat trying to survive along with other animals in a seemingly post-apocalyptic world as the water level dramatically rises.

The film premiered on 22 May 2024 at the 2024 Cannes Film Festival in a Un Certain Regard section, and was released in Latvian theaters on 29 August, followed by subsequent releases in the rest of the world until March 2025. It has grossed US$50 million at the global box office. On the review aggregator website Rotten Tomatoes, 97% of 182 critics' reviews are positive, with an average rating of 8.5/10. The website's consensus reads: "Thanks to its innovative animation and mature themes, going with this Flow proves irresistible." Metacritic, which uses a weighted average, assigned the film a score of 87 out of 100, based on 27 critics, indicating "universal acclaim".

Flow received critical acclaim, becoming the most-viewed film in Latvian theaters in history, foreign films included. Earning multiple awards, it was the first Latvian film to earn Academy Award recognition, and the first independent animated film to win Best Animated Feature. It also became the first animated film without dialogue to win in the category. It also received a Best International Feature Film nomination as Latvia's submission, becoming the second animated film to do so after Flee. Flow was the first Latvian film to be nominated for a Golden Globe Award, winning Best Animated Feature Film; the statuette was later put on display at the Latvian National Museum of Art. Additionally, Zilbalodis was honoured as "Rigan of the Year" in 2024.

== Accolades ==
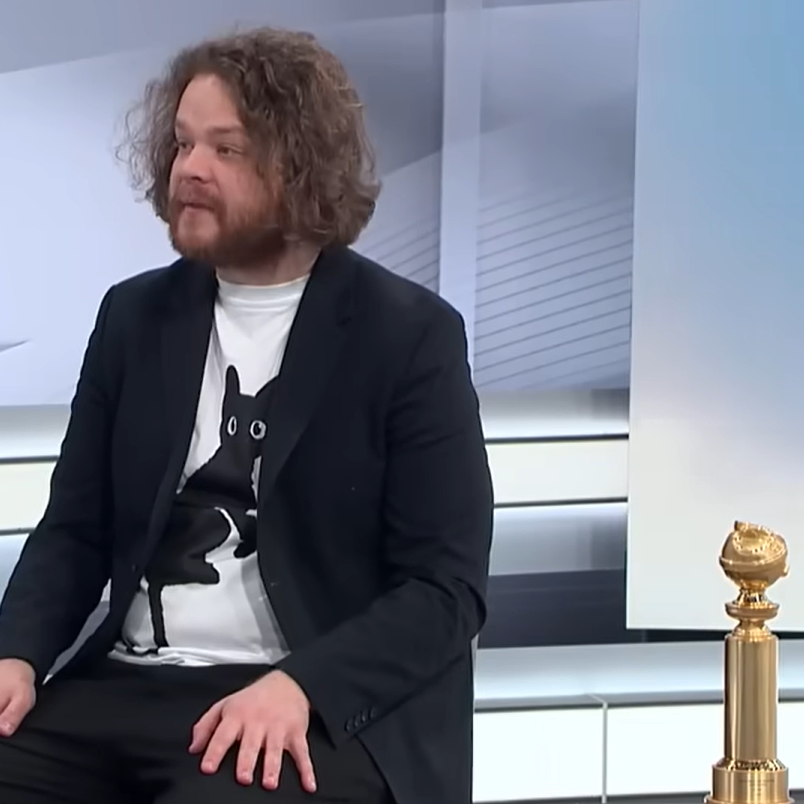
Co-producer Matīss Kaža with the film's Golden Globe trophy

Accolades received by Flow
Award	Ceremony date	Category	Recipient(s)	Result	Ref.
Academy Awards	2 March 2025	Best Animated Feature	Gints Zilbalodis, Matīss Kaža, Ron Dyens, and Gregory Zalcman	Won	
Academy Awards	2 March 2025	Best International Feature Film	Latvia	Nominated	
ACE Eddie Awards	14 March 2025	Best Edited Animated Feature Film (Theatrical or Non-Theatrical)	Gints Zilbalodis	Nominated	
Animation Is Film Festival	22 October 2024	Jury Prize Award	Flow	Won	
Annecy International Animation Film Festival	15 June 2024	Cristal Award for a Feature Film	Flow	Nominated	
Annecy International Animation Film Festival	15 June 2024	Gan Foundation Award for Distribution	Flow	Won	
Annecy International Animation Film Festival	15 June 2024	Jury Award for a Feature Film	Flow	Won	
Annecy International Animation Film Festival	15 June 2024	Audience Award for a Feature Film	Flow	Won	
Annecy International Animation Film Festival	15 June 2024	Best Original Music Award for a Feature Film	Gints Zilbalodis and Rihards Zaļupe	Won	
Annie Awards	8 February 2025	Best Animated Feature — Independent	Flow	Won	
Annie Awards	8 February 2025	Outstanding Achievement for Directing in an Animated Feature Production	Gints Zilbalodis	Nominated	
Annie Awards	8 February 2025	Outstanding Achievement for Writing in an Animated Feature Production	Gints Zilbalodis and Matīss Kaža	Won	
Astra Film Awards	8 December 2024	Best Animated Feature	Flow	Nominated	
Astra Film Awards	8 December 2024	Best International Feature	Flow	Nominated	
Austin Film Critics Association	6 January 2025	Best Animated Film	Flow	Nominated	
Austin Film Critics Association	6 January 2025	Best International Film	Flow	Nominated	
Bandung Film Festival	31 October 2025	Commendable Imported Film - Praiseworthy Adventure Animated Film	Flow	Won	
Boston Society of Film Critics Awards	8 December 2024	Best Animated Film	Flow	Won	
British Academy Film Awards	16 February 2025	Best Animated Film	Gints Zilbalodis, Matīss Kaža, Ron Dyens, and Gregory Zalcman	Nominated	
British Academy Film Awards	16 February 2025	Best Children's & Family Film	Gints Zilbalodis, Matīss Kaža, Ron Dyens, and Gregory Zalcman	Nominated	
Cannes Film Festival	24 May 2024	Un Certain Regard	Gints Zilbalodis	Nominated	
César Awards	28 February 2025	Best Animated Film	Flow	Won	
Chicago Film Critics Association Awards	11 December 2024	Best Animated Film	Flow	Won	
Critics' Choice Movie Awards	7 February 2025	Best Animated Feature	Flow	Nominated	
Critics' Choice Movie Awards	7 February 2025	Best Foreign Language Film	Flow	Nominated	
Dallas–Fort Worth Film Critics Association	18 December 2024	Best Animated Film	Flow	Runner-up	
Dorian Awards	13 February 2025	Animated Film of the Year	Flow	Won	
EDA Awards	7 January 2025	Best Animated Film	Flow	Won (Note: Tied with The Wild Robot)	
EDA Awards	7 January 2025	Best International Film	Flow	Nominated	
European Film Academy	29 April 2025	Lux Award	Flow	Won	
European Film Awards	7 December 2024	European Film	Flow	Shortlisted	
European Film Awards	7 December 2024	European Animated Feature Film	Flow	Won	
Florida Film Critics Circle	20 December 2024	Best Animated Film	Flow	Won	
Florida Film Critics Circle	20 December 2024	Best Original Score	Gints Zilbalodis and Rihards Zaļupe	Nominated	
Golden Globe Awards	5 January 2025	Best Animated Feature Film	Flow	Won	
Golden Trailer Awards	29 May 2025	Best Foreign Animation/Family	Curzon / Silk Factory (for "Journey")	Won	
Golden Trailer Awards	29 May 2025	Best Foreign Animation/Family	Sideshow / Mark Woollen & Associates (for "Horizon")	Nominated	
Goya Awards	8 February 2025	Best European Film	Flow	Nominated	
Guadalajara International Film Festival	15 June 2024	Best Animated Film	Flow	Won	
Independent Spirit Awards	22 February 2025	Best International Film	Gints Zilbalodis	Won	
International Cinephile Society Awards	9 February 2025	Best Animated Film	Flow	Won	
Lielais Kristaps	4 February 2025	Best Screenplay	Gints Zilbalodis and Matīss Kaža	Won	
Lielais Kristaps	4 February 2025	Best Animated Feature Film	Gints Zilbalodis and Matīss Kaža	Won	
Lielais Kristaps	4 February 2025	Best Editing	Gints Zilbalodis	Nominated	
Lielais Kristaps	4 February 2025	Best Director - Animated Feature	Gints Zilbalodis	Won	
Lielais Kristaps	4 February 2025	Best Production Design - Animated Feature	Gints Zilbalodis	Nominated	
Lielais Kristaps	4 February 2025	Best Sound	Gurwal Coïc-Gallas	Won	
Lielais Kristaps	4 February 2025	Best Score	Rihards Zalupe and Gints Zilbalodis	Won	
Lielais Kristaps	4 February 2025	Audience Award	Flow	Won	
Los Angeles Film Critics Association Awards	8 December 2024	Best Animated Film	Flow	Won	
Lumière Awards	20 January 2025	Best Animated Film	Flow	Won	
National Board of Review Awards	4 December 2024	Best Animated Film	Flow	Won	
New York Film Critics Circle Awards	3 December 2024	Best Animated Film	Flow	Won	
New York Film Critics Online	16 December 2024	Best Animation	Flow	Won	
Online Film Critics Society Awards	27 January 2025	Best Animated Feature	Flow	Won	
Ottawa International Animation Festival	28 September 2024	Grand Prize for Feature Animation	Flow	Won	
Rigan of the Year	18 November 2024	—N/a	Gints Zilbalodis	Won	
Polish Film Awards	9 March 2026	Best European Film	Gints Zilbalodis	Pending	
San Diego Film Critics Society Awards	9 December 2024	Best Animated Feature	Flow	Won	
San Francisco Film Critics Circle Awards	15 December 2024	Best Animated Feature	Flow	Won	
Satellite Awards	26 January 2025	Best Motion Picture – Animated or Mixed Media	Flow	Nominated	
Seattle Film Critics Society Awards	16 December 2024	Best Animated Feature	Flow	Nominated	
Seattle Film Critics Society Awards	16 December 2024	Best International Film	Flow	Nominated	
Seville European Film Festival	16 November 2024	Grand Jury Award	Flow	Won	
Seville European Film Festival	16 November 2024	Best Editing	Gints Zilbalodis	Won	
Seville European Film Festival	16 November 2024	Puerta América Award	Flow	Won	
St. Louis Film Critics Association Awards	15 December 2024	Best Animated Feature	Flow	Nominated	
Toronto Film Critics Association Awards	15 December 2024	Best Animated Film	Flow	Won	
Washington D.C. Area Film Critics Association Awards	8 December 2024	Best Animated Feature	Flow	Nominated	
Washington D.C. Area Film Critics Association Awards	8 December 2024	Best International Film	Flow	Nominated	

== Sources ==
- Blauvelt, Christian (2 March 2025). "'Flow' Wins Best Animated Feature Oscar, the First Indie Film to Do So". IndieWire. Archived from the original on 3 March 2025.
- Davis, Clayton (8 December 2024). "Anora Nabs Best Picture at L.A. Film Critics Awards, Marianne Jean-Baptiste Makes History With Lead Win (Full Winners List)". Vanity Fair. Archived from the original on 8 December 2024.
- Dockterman, Eliana (2 March 2025). "The 2025 Oscar Winners Who Made History". Time. Archived from the original on 3 March 2025.
- Ford, Rebecca (3 December 2024). "The Brutalist Tops NYFCC Awards". Vanity Fair. Archived from the original on 4 December 2024.
- "2024 Archives". National Board of Review. 8 December 2024. Archived from the original on 4 December 2024.
- "Celebrating the best of European Cinema". European Film Academy. 8 December 2024. Archived from the original on 14 February 2025.
