= Kristian Sensini =

- Born: 18 November 1976 (age 49); Loreto, Marche, Italy
- Genres: Soundtrack
- Occupation(s): Film composer,
- Instrument(s): Piano, Flute,
- Years active: 2003–present
- Labels: KeyeStudioS, Machiavelli, Gdm Music, R.t.i. Mediaset, Rai Trade, Philology Jazz
- Website: www.kristiansensini.com

Kristian Sensini (born 18 November 1976) is an Italian film composer flutist and music producer. He works for music related Thriller, Horror, Drama Movie, Fantasy, Documentary, Animation and Cartoon. He has composed music for 10 featured films, including film scores for My Love Affair with Marriage in 2022, Rocks in My Pockets in 2014, Hyde's Secret Nightmare in 2011, Dead Enders in 2010, Monkeyshine in 2008.

== Early career ==
He studied at G. Rossini Conservatory in Pesaro for learning composition, arrangements, piano and classical flute, orchestration.

In 2010, he studied with Michael Giacchino, (the Oscar Winner for Up and composer for Lost) Nathan Barr (True Blood, The Hostel), Dave Grusin (Oscar winner for Milagro, composer for The Goonies), Randy Edelman (composer for Dragonheart), Christopher Lennertz (Medal of Honor, Quantum of Solace videogame) and many more. He has studied Orchestration and Composition with Conrad Pope. Kristain also studied at Centro Sperimentale di Cinematografia in Rome with Ennio Morricone.

== Works ==
- 2022 "My Love Affair with Marriage"
- 2014 Rocks In My Pockets: A crazy quest for sanity
- 2012 “Warspear” (Videogame, EU)
- 2011 POE Poetry of Eerie (by various directors)
- 2011 “Hyde's Secret Nightmare” (by Domiziano Cristopharo)
- 2010 “Bloody Sin” (by Domiziano Cristopharo)
- 2010 Documentary about the Italian Architect Tamburini ( By Henry Secchiaroli)
- 2010 "The Museum of Wonders" by Domiziano Cristopharo
- 2010 "Butterfly Rising" by Tanya Wright (True Blood, Csi, 24)
- 2009 "La Fano dei Cesari" by Italian Director Henry Secchiaroli
- 2009 "Dead Enders" (Usa)
- 2008 “Monkeyshine” by Gene Fallaize
- 2004 "The Mongol King" (USA) by Anthony Vallone.

== Awards and nominations ==
- Musicomics 2024 - Won the Award for "My Love Affaire With Marriage" soundtrack
- Colonne Sonore Award 2014- Won the Award for "Rocks In My Pockets" soundtrack
- Global Music Award 2013- Won the Award of Merit for movie soundtrack of Hyde's Secret Nightmare.
- Latvia's Oscar Entry 2014- Rocks In My Pockets (Directed By Signe Baumane) (Foreign Language Film Award).
- Hollywood Music In Media Awards 2014- Rocks In My Pockets (Directed By Signe Baumane) Nominated Best Original Score In Animated Film
- International SAMOBOR Film Music Festival 2014- Rocks In My Pockets (Directed By Signe Baumane): Nominated for Best Original Score.
- Jerry Goldsmith International Film Music Award 2014- Rocks In My Pockets (Directed By Signe Baumane): Nominated for Best Music In Feature Film, Best Animated Feature Film – Animator.
- International SAMOBOR Film Music Festival 2013- “HYDE’S SECRET NIGHTMARE” (directed by Domiziano Cristopharo) nominated BEST ORIGINAL SCORE, FEATURE FILM.
- La Samain du cinema fantastique 2013- “BLOODY SIN” (directed by Domiziano Cristopharo): Nominee BEST MUSIC.
- Fantafestival 33rd edition 2013- “POE: PROJECT OF EVIL” BEST MOVIE.
- Jerry Goldsmith Awards 2013- “LE RADICI DI UNA SCARPA” (directed by Andrea Baldassarri) Nominee BEST MUSIC IN PROMOTIONAL.
- Jerry Goldsmith Awards 2012- “BRIGHTSIDE” (Directed by Clair Haines): Nominee BEST MUSIC IN DOCUMENTARY
- “Trailer Film Festival” 2012- “LINKING LIVES” (directed by Henry Secchiaroli): Won the first prize.
- Jerry Goldsmith Awards 2011- “HYDE’S SECRET NIGHTMARE” (directed by Domiziano Christopharo) Nominee BEST MUSIC IN PROMOTION.
- Jerry Goldsmith Awards 2011- “TAMBURRINI LA COSTRUZIONE DEL POTERE” (directed by Henry Secchiaroli) Nominee BEST MUSIC IN DOCUMENTARY.
- Jerry Goldsmith Awards 2010- “LA FANO DEI CESARI” (directed by Henry Secchiaroli): Nominee BEST MUSIC IN DOCUMENTARY.
- Santa Fe Film Festival (Mexico) 2010- “HOUSE OF FLASH MANNEQUINS” (directed by Domiziano Cristopharo) winner of Independent Spirit Award “Night of Horror” Film Festival” Sidney and Official Selection.

== See also ==
- List of submissions to the 87th Academy Awards for Best Foreign Language Film
- List of Latvian submissions for the Academy Award for Best Foreign Language Film
