= Sturgis Warner =

American Actor, Theater Director

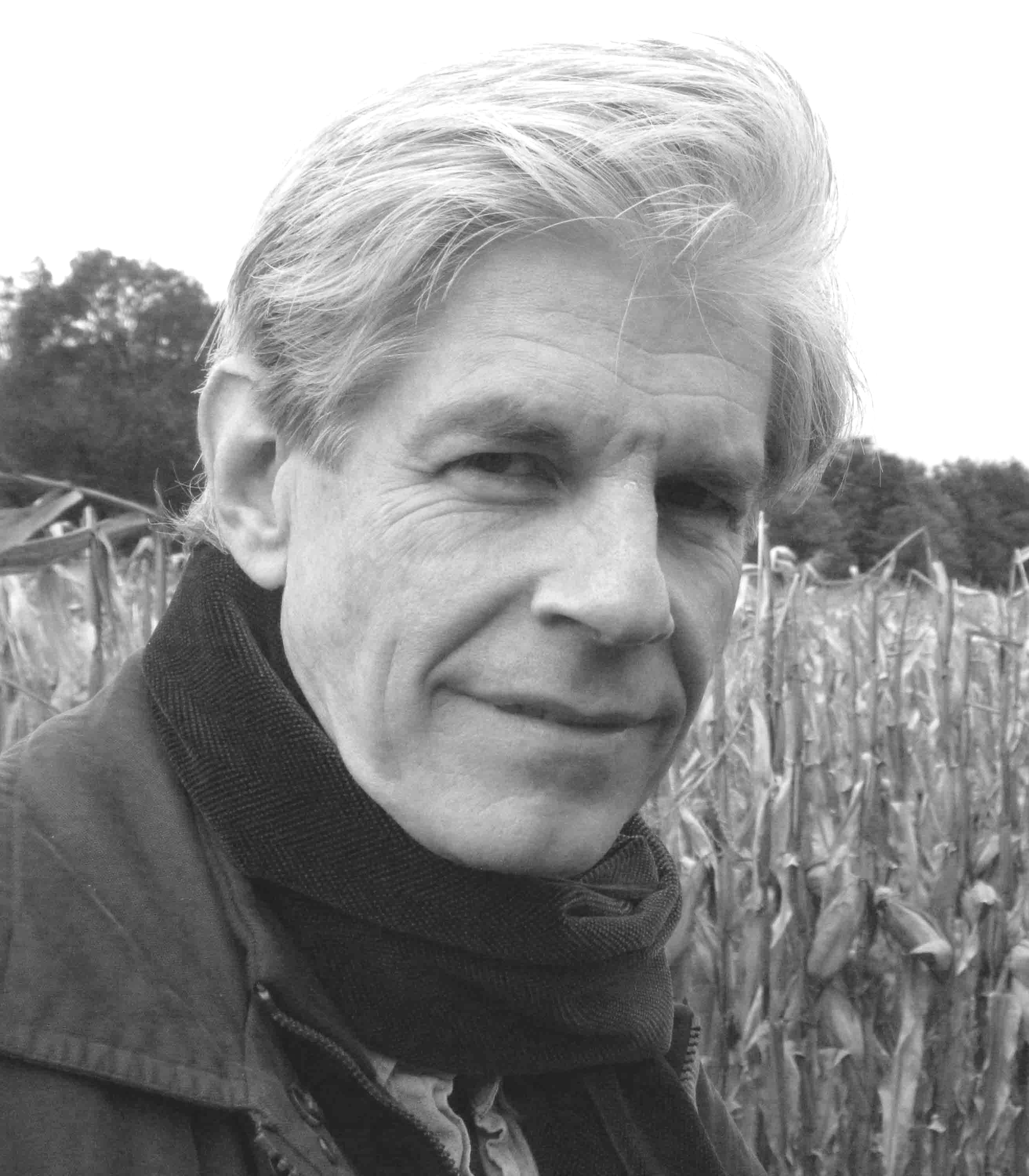
Sturgis Warner

Sturgis Warner is an actor and theater director who specializes in new plays and new-play development. He has also produced two animated feature films by Signe Baumane. He lives in New York City.

== Acting ==
After graduating in theater from Washington University in St. Louis, Warner moved to New York to be an actor. Within two weeks he was cast in Sacred Guard., a futuristic play at La Mama and he joined the booming Off-Off Broadway theater scene in the East Village. Some of the theater artists he worked with in his early years include Jeff Weiss, Tom Eyen, Henry Kreiger, Charles Stanley, Madeleine le Roux, Neil Flanagan, Andre DeShields, Nathan Lane and John Goodman. To help pay rent he drove a taxicab, moved furniture, and eventually developed trade skills as a carpenter and electrician - jobs with flexible schedules in case acting roles came up. At Circle Repertory Company he helped build many sets designed by John Lee Beatty including premieres by Lanford Wilson and Jules Feiffer. He designed and built sets for the Off-Broadway production of Women Behind Bars starring Divine. After five years of low-pay downtown theater he started booking acting jobs in TV commercials, many as a basketball player. He appeared in Magic Johnson's first commercial for 7-Up and worked with other NBA pros such as Bernard King and Spud Webb. He made eight different commercials with former New York Knick players Luther Rackley and Nate Bowman. He acted in a movie, Starting Over, opposite Jill Clayburgh and Burt Reynolds. He studied with famed acting teacher Wynn Handman, a major influence. He acted in plays at The Public Theater, Signature Theater Company, Second Stage, Atlantic Theater Company, The Performing Garage, PS122, HERE Arts Center and numerous others.

== Theater directing ==
In 1992 Warner directed his first play, a student production at American Academy of Dramatic Arts, America's oldest acting school. Over the next several years he directed nine more plays at the Academy, all as a freelancer. In 1998 Warner founded Twilight Theater Company, a 501(c)(3) organization dedicated to the production of new plays. Through Twilight, Warner produced and directed new plays by Michael John Garcés, Gordon Dahlquist, Saïd Sayrafiezadeh, Ted LoRusso, Daniel Macdonald and Najla Said. Said performed her one-woman play Palestine for ten weeks to sold-out audiences at New York Theater Workshop. Through readings, workshops, and retreats, Warner worked extensively developing new plays at The Lark Play Development Company (closed in 2021), New York Theater Workshop, where he is a "Usual Suspect" and elsewhere. As a freelancer, Warner directed productions of new plays at theaters in New York City and around the country.

In 2013 Warner began to put his focus on acting once again. Margarett Perry took over as Artistic Director of Twilight Theater Company.

== Animation ==
In 2010 Warner started to work with filmmaker/animator Signe Baumane on her first animated feature film Rocks in My Pockets (2014). He was her dramaturg on the script and directed her 85-minute voiceover. He helped build background sets for her animation and was the lighting designer when she photographed them. As the film neared completion he came on board as Co- Producer. Rocks in My Pockets premiered at Karlovy Vary International Film Festival and went on to screen at 130 other film festivals. Zeitgeist Films was the theatrical distributor in North America.

In 2015 Baumane and Warner founded The Marriage Project LLC to begin work on her new animated feature My Love Affair with Marriage. Along with producing the film, he was the script advisor, casting director, set builder/designer and lighting designer bringing theater and new-play principles and skills into her animation. My Love Affair with Marriage premiered June 11, 2022 at Tribeca Festival and has screened at 65 other film festivals winning numerous awards

== Miscellaneous ==
- Warner played softball in the Broadway Show League for many years. He was on Meat Loaf's team for five seasons, and later played for Actors' Equity Association.
- For two summers, twelve years apart, Warner worked as a ranch hand at Beckton Stock Farm, a breeder of Red Angus cattle, in Sheridan, Wyoming.
- Inspired by his experience directing a play about Alaska, Warner travelled to Wrangell, a small fishing town in Southeast Alaska, talked his way onto a commercial fishing boat, a gillnetter, and worked as a deckhand fishing for salmon. Three summers later he returned to Alaska, this time to Cordova, where he crewed on a seine boat, and again fished for salmon. In August, the 45-foot boat hit a reef and sank in minutes. He and his four crew mates lost everything but their lives. He wrote a solo play about the experience, Fishing for Alaska, which he performed at INTAR in 2013.
- In 2009, Constance Rosenberg of The New York Times wrote an article about Warner and the renovation work he did on his apartment called A Production Called Home. She later included the article in her book Habitats: Private Lives in the Big City published by New York University Press.
