= Starting Over (1979 film) =

1979 film by Alan J. Pakula

- Theatrical release poster
- Directed by: Alan J. Pakula
- Screenplay by: James L. Brooks
- Based on: Starting Over by Dan Wakefield
- Produced by: Alan J. Pakula; James L. Brooks
- Starring: Burt Reynolds; Jill Clayburgh; Candice Bergen
- Cinematography: Sven Nykvist
- Edited by: Marion Rothman
- Music by: Marvin Hamlisch
- Distributed by: Paramount Pictures
- Release date: October 5, 1979
- Running time: 105 minutes
- Country: United States
- Language: English
- Budget: $10 million
- Box office: $38.2 million

Starting Over is a 1979 American romantic comedy-drama film directed by Alan J. Pakula from a screenplay by James L. Brooks, based on the 1973 novel by Dan Wakefield. Starring Burt Reynolds, Jill Clayburgh, and Candice Bergen, it follows a recently divorced man who is torn between his new girlfriend and his ex-wife.

The film was nominated for two Academy Awards for Best Actress (Clayburgh) and Best Supporting Actress (Bergen). Marvin Hamlisch and Carole Bayer Sager wrote three original songs for the film, "Easy for You", "Better Than Ever", and "Starting Over", which are sung by Bergen in the film, but sung by Stephanie Mills for the radio versions.

== Plot ==
Phil Potter, a freelance magazine writer, is taken aback when his wife Jessica, who cheated on him with his boss, asks for a divorce, determined to pursue a career as a singer-songwriter. Phil moves from New York City to Boston, where his psychiatrist brother, Mickey, lives with his wife, Marva, and rents an apartment in the city. Mickey and Marva set him up with a friend, Marilyn Holmberg, a neurotic nursery school teacher working on her master's degree. Phil asks Marilyn out on a date, but she is wary of recently divorced men and tells him they should wait a few months.

After learning his divorce has been finalized, Phil attends a support group for divorced men in a church basement and goes on his first date in eight years with Marilyn's friend Marie, a single mother, but he does not reciprocate her enthusiasm. Returning home from the date, Phil calls Marilyn and persuades her to have dinner with him. After dating for two weeks, Phil and Marilyn have sex for the first time. He also takes a new job teaching a college course in creative writing.

During a Thanksgiving dinner at Mickey and Marva's house with Marilyn, Phil takes a phone call from Jessica. Marilyn overhears him telling Jessica that he is dining with his family and "their friend". Hurt, she ends their relationship, thinking that Phil still has feelings for Jessica. Soon afterwards, Phil confronts Marilyn at a school carnival, where she is volunteering in a dunk tank. After dunking Marilyn several times, Phil, believing that they need to define their relationship more clearly, asks her to move in with him, to which she agrees.

On their first evening living together, Phil is surprised when he returns to the apartment to find Marilyn sitting on the couch with Jessica, who is dressed in a low-cut blouse. After Marilyn allows the former spouses to talk privately, Phil drives Jessica back to her hotel room, where he nearly gives in to her advances, but as she sings a song she wrote about their reconciliation, he loses interest and leaves. Later that night, Jessica calls Phil to explain that her behavior was inspired by her love for him. During a support group meeting, Phil confesses that he really wanted to have sex with his ex-wife.

While shopping for a couch with Marilyn at Bloomingdale's, Phil has a panic attack, and Mickey is summoned to calm him down. Afterwards, Phil informs Marilyn that he must reconcile with Jessica, and Marilyn makes him promise that he will never contact her again. Phil moves back to New York City and tries to resume his relationship with Jessica, but realizes that he misses Marilyn. Weeks later, he returns to Boston, unaware that Marilyn is now dating John Morganson, a professional basketball player with the Boston Celtics.

Phil buys the couch Marilyn wanted at Bloomingdale's, and the next day, he approaches her outside her nursery school dressed as Santa Claus, but she does not recognize him and drives away with John. Phil then tracks Marilyn down at the Boston Garden during a Celtics practice. Marilyn insists she is no longer interested in Phil until he proposes to her. Moved by the proposal, Marilyn embraces Phil and they leave together. That night, she is excited to learn that Phil has bought the couch.

== Cast ==
- Burt Reynolds as Phil Potter
- Jill Clayburgh as Marilyn Holmberg
- Candice Bergen as Jessica Potter
- Charles Durning as Dr. Michael "Mickey" Potter
- Frances Sternhagen as Marva Potter
- Austin Pendleton as Paul
- Mary Kay Place as Marie
- MacIntyre Dixon as Dan
- Jay Sanders as Larry
- Charles Kimbrough as department store salesman
- Richard Whiting as Everett
- Alfie Wise as Barry
- Wallace Shawn as Jerry
- Sturgis Warner as John Morganson
- Daniel Stern as student #2
- Ian Martin as doorman
- Ben Pesner as Victor Potter
- Kevin Bacon as husband in young couple (scene deleted but still credited)

== Production ==
Starting Over marked the first feature film screenplay for James L. Brooks. Principal photography began on November 13, 1978, in New York City, with filming also taking place in Boston.

== Reception ==
=== Critical response ===
Roger Ebert gave the film two stars out of four and wrote that it "feels sort of embarrassed at times, maybe because characters are placed in silly sitcom situations and then forced to say lines that are supposed to be revealing and real." Gene Siskel of the Chicago Tribune gave the film three stars out of four and said it was worth seeing because "Two-thirds of it (Reynolds and Clayburgh) work very well", though he disliked Candice Bergen, saying "she is awful in this picture" and that the script "somehow feels obliged to be cute or funny. We don't want jokes from Starting Over. All we want is to see Reynolds and Clayburgh go out together and work on their problems." Variety called the film "a delight. Much more than the flip side of An Unmarried Woman, to which it will inevitably be compared, the James L. Brook [sic] production takes on the subject of marital dissolution from a comic point of view, and succeeds admirably."

Charles Champlin of the Los Angeles Times declared, "It is, all in all, a classy entertainment which, right now and in years to come, will remind us quite accurately how things were between middle-class men and women, circa 1980." Jack Kroll of Newsweek stated that the film "starts out well and continues well for about two-thirds of the way before succumbing to the creeping virus of the cutesies. But until then, Pakula finds a nice groove of effectively understated comedy." Frank Rich said in Time, "Though this film has funny lines and a potentially explosive story, it rarely generates any emotion beyond bland good cheer. Right up to the moment that Starting Over is over, we are still waiting for the fireworks to start." Gary Arnold of The Washington Post wrote, "As the newly divorced hero of Starting Over, a delightful romantic comedy destined for enormous well-deserved popularity, Burt Reynolds reaches a breathtaking new plateau of screen acting dexterity."

On the review aggregator website Rotten Tomatoes, the film holds an approval rating of 78% based on nine reviews, with an average rating of 6.6/10.

=== Accolades ===
Award	Category	Recipient(s)	Result	Ref.
Academy Awards	Best Actress	Jill Clayburgh	Nominated	
Academy Awards	Best Supporting Actress	Candice Bergen	Nominated	
Golden Globes	Best Actor in a Motion Picture – Musical or Comedy	Burt Reynolds	Nominated	
Golden Globes	Best Actress in a Motion Picture – Musical or Comedy	Jill Clayburgh	Nominated	
Golden Globes	Best Supporting Actress – Motion Picture	Candice Bergen	Nominated	
Golden Globes	Best Original Song	Marvin Hamlisch and Carole Bayer Sager for "Better Than Ever"	Nominated	
