= Fantadroms =

Latvian animated television series

- Genre: science fiction
- Directed by: Ansis Bērziņš
- Country of origin: Latvia
- No. of seasons: 1
- No. of episodes: 13

Production
- Running time: 10 min (1984–1986) 7 min (1992–1995)
- Production company: Latvijas Televīzija (1984–1986) Studija Dauka (1992–1995)

Original release
- Network: Latvijas Televīzija
- Release: 1984 – 1995

Fantadroms is a Latvian science fiction animated series produced by Studio Dauka. It first aired in the Latvian SSR in 1985. The show has no dialogue and drama unfolds through pantomime and expressive noises such as grunts, groans, and laughter. This allows the show to cross language barriers.

The episode "Salt" won the Lielais Kristaps award for best animation in 1985, and further episodes were made sporadically until 1995.

In the early 1990s, Streamline Pictures was planning to release Fantadroms in the United States, but it was scrapped because the company thought the series was too bizarre for American children and that the person representing it did not actually have the rights to it.

== Plot ==
The main character of the show is a yellow shape-shifting robot called Indriķis XIII, who takes the form of a cat. He flies through the universe mediating various disputes between the other characters or saving them from disaster. One recurring dynamic in the show is the love triangle between Indriķis, Receklīte ("clot" in Latvian, a flying purple octopus-like alien with a cat face with whom Indriķis is in love), and The Rat (who is in love with Indriķis). Other recurring characters include a cow, two human boys, and an amorphous pink blob.

== Episode list ==
No. overall	No. in series	Title	Directed by	Written by	Original release date
0	pilot	"Takeoff Field of Fantasy"	Ansis Bērziņš	Ansis Bērziņš	1984
1	1	"The Laugh"	Ansis Bērziņš	Ansis Bērziņš	1985
2	2	"The Salt"	Ansis Bērziņš	Ansis Bērziņš	1985
3	3	"The Fire"	Ansis Bērziņš	Ansis Bērziņš	1985
4	4	"Flowers"	Ansis Bērziņš	Ansis Bērziņš	1992
5	5	"Milk"	Ansis Bērziņš	Ansis Bērziņš	1993
6	6	"Ice Cream"	Aivars Rušmanis	Ansis Bērziņš, Uģis Segliņš	1993
7	7	"The Contest"	Dzintars Krūmiņš	Uģis Segliņš	1993
8	8	"Earthquake"	Jānis Kārkliņš	Uģis Segliņš	1993
9	9	"Feeding Bottle"	Aivars Rušmanis	Uģis Segliņš, Ansis Bērziņš	1994
10	10	"A Little House"	Jānis Kārkliņš	Ansis Bērziņš, Aldis Linē	1994
11	11	"Rainbow"	Dace Liepa	Ilze Skrastiņa, Ansis Bērziņš	1994
12	12	"Cocoa"	Ilze Ruska	Ansis Bērziņš, Aldis Linē	1995
13	13	"Daddy"	Ilze Ruska	Ansis Bērziņš, Aldis Linē	1995

Episodes "Takeoff Field of Fantasy", "The Salt" and "The Fire" got another cut a few years after release, being shortened as a result. "Takeoff Field of Fantasy" was renamed into "The Laugh" on that release.
