= To Be Continued (2018 film) =

2018 film

- Film poster
- Directed by: Ivars Seleckis
- Written by: Dace Dzenovska
- Produced by: Antra Gaile; Gints Grūbe
- Cinematography: Valdis Celmiņš
- Edited by: Andra Doršs
- Music by: Kārlis Auzāns
- Release date: 22 March 2018
- Running time: 95 minutes
- Country: Latvia
- Language: Latvian

To Be Continued (Latvian: Turpinājums) is a 2018 Latvian documentary film directed by Ivars Seleckis. It was selected as the Latvian entry for the Best Foreign Language Film at the 91st Academy Awards, but it was not nominated.

== Overview ==
Director Ivars Seleckis profiles five children from all walks of life across Latvia. The film's international premiere was at 49th edition of Visions du Réel in 2018, one of the leading international documentary film festivals in Europe, held in Nyon, Switzerland. The film received three awards at the Latvian National Film Awards: Best Documentary Film Director (Ivars Seleckis), Best Documentary Film Cinematographer (Valdis Celmiņš), and Best Editor (Andra Doršs).

== See also ==
- List of submissions to the 91st Academy Awards for Best Foreign Language Film
- List of Latvian submissions for the Academy Award for Best Foreign Language Film
