= My Love Affair with Marriage =

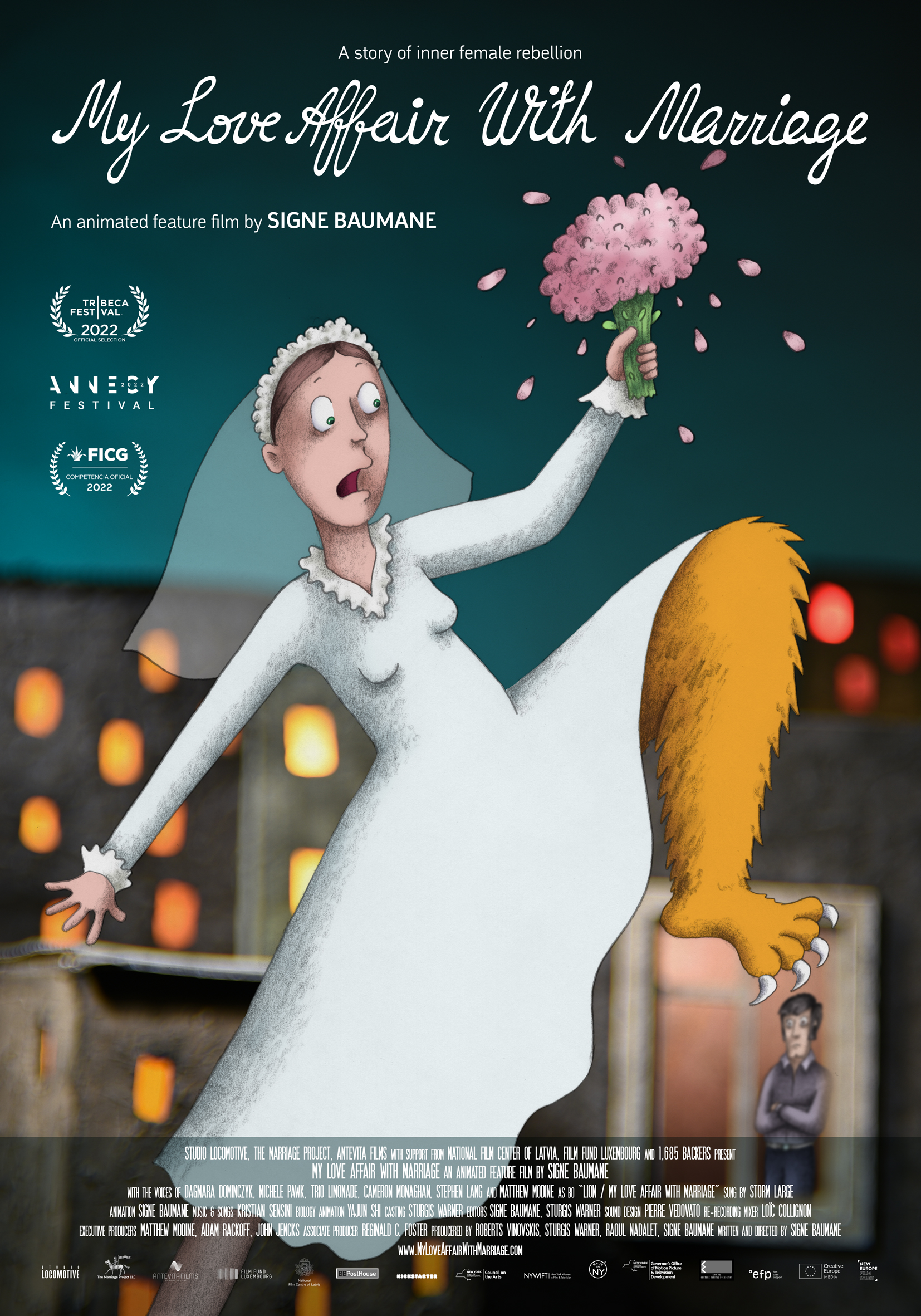
- Original Poster
- Directed by: Signe Baumane
- Written by: Signe Baumane
- Produced by: Roberts Vinovskis; Sturgis Warner; Raoul Nadalet; Signe Baumane
- Starring: Dagmara Dominczyk; Michele Pawk; Trio Limonāde; Cameron Monaghan; Stephen Lang; Storm Large; Matthew Modine
- Edited by: Signe Baumane; Sturgis Warner
- Music by: Kristian Sensini
- Animation by: Signe Baumane; Yajun Shi (Biology animation)
- Layouts by: Signe Baumane
- Production companies: Studio Locomotive; The Marriage Project; Antevita Films
- Distributed by: New Europe Film Sales (Sales Agent); Studio Locomotive (Latvia); Tamasa (France); Filmin (Spain); HBO Central Europe
- Release date: June 11, 2022 (Tribeca)
- Running time: 108 minutes
- Countries: Latvia; United States; Luxembourg
- Language: English

My Love Affair with Marriage is a 2022 semi-autobiographical adult animated musical comedy-drama film animated, written and directed by Signe Baumane, her second feature following Rocks in My Pockets (2014). The story follows a young woman, Zelma, on her 23-year quest for perfect love and lasting marriage, set against a backdrop of historic events in Eastern Europe. Pressured by Mythology Sirens to be the ideal woman and is unable to free herself from the biology of her own brain, Zelma finds love and loses it multiple times before discovering who she really is. Told from a female point of view, this is a coming-of-age story of love, gender, marriage, abuse, hopes, fantasies, and ultimately, finding a better place for women in society.

An international co-production of companies in Latvia, the United States and Luxembourg, the film took seven years to complete. Kristian Sensini of Italy composed 24 songs and wrote the score. Yajun Shi of China animated the Biology sections. Dagmara Dominczyk voices Zelma, with executive producer Matthew Modine as being one of Zelma's husbands.

My Love Affair with Marriage had its world premiere at Tribeca Festival on June 11, 2022 and went on to screen at many other international festivals. It won a Jury Distinction for a Feature Film award at Annecy International Animation Film Festival, an Excellence in Narrative Directing award at Woodstock Film Festival, Best Feature Film awards at both Viborg Animation Festival and Fredrikstad Animation Festival and was nominated for a European Film Academy Award, the first Latvian film to do so. Huffington Post named it as "one of the best movies of 2022."

== Plot ==
Hungry for love and acceptance, young Zelma feels incomplete. Hounded by three singing Mythology Sirens, she sets out on a 23-year quest for perfect love and lasting marriage. She is unaware, however, that her own Biology is a powerful force to be reckoned with.

More than anything, 8-year-old Zelma wants love. Only love will make her complete, the Mythology Sirens insist. But love is elusive when you are an outcast at school and a loner at home. Guided by the Mythology Siren's hypnotic songs, Zelma tries to change herself into the kind of girl that boys like – cute, weak, demure.

But there are consequences, counters Biology. Zelma has DNA, millions of neural pathways, and a vast array of chemical reactions inside her brain that make up her personality. Zelma has no choice but to be a battleground of conflicts between the Mythology Sirens and Biology as she struggles to find her own ground.

Coming of age brings blood and creepy compliments. Her early sexual encounters confound her, and, tragically, her best friend Darya dies in childbirth. Zelma is comforted by marriage to Sergei, but it soon veers into domestic abuse. A second, gender-bending marriage to Bo, though brief, deepens her understanding of herself and her place in the world.

== Voice cast ==
- Dagmara Dominczyk as Zelma
- Michele Pawk as Biology
- Trio Limonāde (Iluta Alsberga, Ieva Katkovska, Kristīne Pastare) as the Mythology Sirens
- Cameron Monaghan as Sergei (Zelma's first husband)
- Matthew Modine as Bo (Zelma's second husband)
- Stephen Lang as Jonas (the older artist)
- Storm Large as End-credits Singer
- Erica Schroeder as Elita (the singing perfect girl)
- Florencia Lozano as Zelma's Mother
- Emma Kenney as Sarma (Zelma's sister)
- Carolyn Baeumler as Darya (Zelma's college friend)
- Christina Pumariega as Darya's Mother
- Tracy Thorne as Master of Ceremonies (funeral)
- Laila Robins as Master of Ceremonies (wedding)
- Anna O'Donoghue as Teacher 1
- Tanya Franks as Teacher 2
- Clyde Baldo as Eduards (school bully)
- Najla Said as New Girl
- Dan Domingues as Lauris (the kissing high school senior)
- Keith Randolph Smith as Man on Train
- Ruby Modine as Nina (Sergei's Mother)
- Cindy Cheung as Velta (Gallery owner)
- Brian Dykstra as Estonian 1
- Andrew Garman as Estonian 2
- Dale Soules as Latvian Official
- Michael Laurence as Big Man
- Sturgis Warner as Big Man's Friend
- Jennifer Dorr White as Swedish Pastor

== Development ==
=== Writing ===
Baumane began the script in 2015. She set out to write about her second marriage to a self-described gender-bending man from Sweden, but soon expanded the story to explore what made them want to get married in the first place. From there, a story of a young woman's search for love, purpose and meaning emerged. Baumane asked herself where do young women get the idea that they have to marry to be a complete person and have a worthy life? Where does it start? Also, what is love? What's the basis of it? What happens neurologically when people fall in and out of love?

Over the next year Baumane researched the biology of love and consulted periodically with NYU professor Pascal Wallisch, PhD for scientific accuracy. She wrote 24 drafts of the script weaving into her story the ways body chemistry dictates many of the decisions humans make and the feelings they feel. For this she created a neuron-like character, Biology. She also researched the anthropology and culture of love and created three singing, shape-shifting characters, the Mythology Sirens, who try to influence Zelma through pop songs. Composer Kristian Sensini wrote the music to Baumane's lyrics.

=== Casting and recording ===
Baumane and casting director Sturgis Warner looked to cast actors with extensive theater credits and excellent language skills. They signed a Theatrical Contract with SAG-AFTRA and began making offers. Dagmara Dominczyk played Zelma from ages 7 to 29 and narrated the film from an older age. Michele Pawk voiced the second narrator, Biology. The Latvian singing group Trio Limonāde recorded the Mythology Sirens both in English and Latvian (for the Latvian language version). Matthew Modine came on board to voice Bo, Zelma's second husband, and with him brought three actors from Shameless: Cameron Monaghan to voice Sergei, Zelma's first husband, Emma Kenney and Ruby Modine.

in 2017, Baumane and Warner recorded 29 actors and singers in New York City, Los Angeles and Riga, Latvia. Arjun G. Sheth, the New York Recording engineer, edited the recordings into a working vocal track.

In 2021, Storm Large recorded Lion / My Love Affair with Marriage, the end-credit song with music by Sensini and lyrics by Baumane.

=== Production ===
In Brooklyn, the production process began with the construction of background sets, approximately 65 of them for the 145 scenes in the film. Warner built each set out of wood creating 3-D environments into which Baumane animated her 2-D characters. When finished, he would pass the set on to the art department where the team would cover it with papier-mâché, paint an undercoat of black, then four more coats, darkest colors to lightest, to create textured looks on the surfaces of the set.

Warner, also lighting designer, then lit the set and Baumane, the Cinematographer, photographed it using an array of stop-motion techniques to create zooms, pans and other camera movements. Once a set was photographed, Baumane imported the shots into Premiere Pro to see how the images fit with the vocal track. She would print out the chosen images and using a light box to precisely line up fresh pieces of paper, she would animate 2-D characters, pencil on paper, into the photographed scene. The team scanned the drawings, organized them, and sent them to the Latvian team working at Studio Locomotive in Riga led by Producer Roberts Vinovskis. The Latvian team colored the drawings in Photoshop and composited the characters into the photographs using After Effects. Finally, they would create QuickTime movies to send back to Brooklyn for editing.

=== Animation ===
Baumane animated all the characters in My Love Affair with Marriage with the exception of Biology. She worked in the traditional animation style, pencil on paper, using 662 pencils in all. Baumane explained, "I like animating on paper because the pencil becomes an extension of my hand, and the impulse goes from my gut into my heart, through my shoulder into my fingertips and when I draw the line, I become one with the line, I become one with the pencil and that is an expression of what I feel and who I am. And so, pencil and paper inspire me the way that no software, no computer program can inspire me."

Yajun Shi animated the Biology sections, thirteen minutes altogether. Baumane wanted a different animator for those sections, but one with a style that would complement her own. Shi animated on a tablet directly in Photoshop and moved back and forth between Photoshop and After Effects to create her unique style.

My Love Affair with Marriage has four different styles of animation representing four distinct worlds.

- The world in which Zelma's life unfolds is represented by practical 3-D sets, photographed in stop motion with 2-D animated characters on top, with sketched-in shadows.
- The world of Zelma's imagination is depicted by flat drawings and flat, colorful backgrounds. This world helps Zelma process the events around her.
- The world of Biology, omnipresent and powerful, not visible to the naked human eye.
- The political world, the Maps, are animated in an app called OpenStreetMap. It shows the arc of Zelma's understanding of the world and how it is relates to her inner experiences."

=== Post-production ===
Baumane and Warner edited the final picture. Post-production sound was created at Philophon Studios in Luxembourg, produced by Raoul Nadalet of Antevita Films and financed by FilmFund Luxembourg.

- Christophe Burdet was the foley artist, the creator of sound effects. As animation, My Love Affair with Marriage had no incidental sounds other than vocal track of the actors. Burdet had to created them from scratch.
- Pierre Vedovato, the sound designer, also created different aural atmospheric environments for the film's 145 scenes and arranged them with the Foleys, the actors' voices, the songs, and musical scoring.
- Loïc Collignon, the re-recording mixer, took over 1,000 tracks of sound and orchestrated them into a 7.1 surround sound mix, the current standard for cinema viewing.

In Riga, the team at Studio Locomotive executed final mastering and color correction, and prepared all the deliverables – the various formats a feature film needs for widespread distribution.

=== Financing ===
My Love Affair with Marriage is an independent production funded over a six-year period by 1,685 individual backers and grants from a variety of institutions and foundations.

- From Latvia: National Film Centre of Latvia, Culture Capital Foundation of Latvia, BB PostHouse
- From Luxembourg: FilmFund Luxembourg
- From Europe: Creative Europe MEDIA
- From the United States: New York State Film Tax Credit Program, New York State Council on the Arts, The NYC Women's Fund for Media, Music and Theatre by the City of New York Mayor's Office of Media and Entertainment in association with The New York Foundation for the Arts, John Simon Guggenheim Foundation, H. O. Peet Foundation, The Ravenal Foundation Grant of New York Women in Film & Television, Kickstarter and 1,685 individual backers

== Release ==
New Europe Film Sales is the international sales agent for the film.

My Love Affair with Marriage had three premieres over a five-day period: the World Premiere at Tribeca Festival in New York City on June 11, 2022, the European Premiere at Annecy International Animation Film Festival in France June 15, 2022, and the Latin American Premiere at Guadalajara International Film Festival in Mexico June 15, 2022. It has gone on to screen at over 90 other international film festivals winning multiple awards along the way.

- Tamasa Distribution released My Love Affair with Marriage in France June 7, 2023.
- Filmin released My Love Affair With Marriage in Spain in 2023.
- In 2023 HBO Central Europe will release My Love Affair With Marriage in 13 Central European countries: Albania, Czech Republic, Slovakia, Hungary, Poland, Romania, Moldova, Croatia, Slovenia, Serbia, Kosovo, Montenegro, Bosnia-Herzegovina, North Macedonia and Bulgaria.
- Mans laulību projekts (My Marriage Project), a Latvian language version of My Love Affair with Marriage voiced by 14 Latvian actors, premiered at Riga International Film Festival October 13, 2022 and screened in Latvian cinemas throughout the rest of 2022.
- My Love Affair With Marriage will have its North American theatrical release through 8 Above beginning October 6, 2023 in New York City.

== Reception ==
- "Latvian filmmaker Signe Baumane quietly delivered one of the best female resistance films of the year — and it's animated. It's a wonderful surprise in a movie already filled to the brim with them. It's a sprawling story that follows the life of Zelma (voiced by Dagmara Domińczyk), a girl who is destined to walk down the much-tread path of her ancestors to be married to a man and taken care of. But the more she grows up and experiences new things, including bullies at school and terrible boyfriends, the more she realizes that what's destined for her may not be for her. Her body even resists the thought of such conformity. My Love Affair With Marriage is an exuberant and complex movie about the journey to female rebellion." — Candice Frederick, HuffPost
- "Funny, moving, and visually stunning throughout, it's easily one of the most distinct animated films I've seen in quite a while and it serves as a needed reminder that animation is an art form that can be used for more than family-oriented narratives." – Peter Sobczynski, RogerEbert.com
- "A joyfully exuberant piece of work that manages to conduct some serious examination of human behavior whilst always being nothing less than gloriously entertaining. Many of its themes of gender, identity and conformity also seem incredibly timely." – Laurence Boyce, Cineuropa
- "This film is something special. It's unafraid to reveal our innermost thoughts, fears, hopes, regrets, mistakes, and dreams. It celebrates unfiltered authenticity with clever writing and delightful visuals. It's an outstanding feminist film that will undoubtedly win over audiences everywhere." – Liz Whittemore, ReelNewsDaily
- "For those who have more contained ideas about animated films, My Love Affair with Marriage will doubtless make them think twice about the medium's endless possibilities. This is a deeply funny, socially conscious sharp satire with heart." – Josh Batchelder, Josh at the Movies
- "Right from the start, Signe Baumane's animation proves it has earned a place in the hallowed halls of raw storytelling. Rough, storybook-sketched 2D characters are layered on top of highly texturized stop-motion backgrounds, detailing every paint stroke, scrape, sometimes even mold spore. And the imagery is just the start." – Victoria Davis, Animation World Network

=== Accolades ===
Festival	Date of Ceremony	Award Category	Recipient	Result	Ref.
Tribeca Festival, New York City	June 16, 2022	International Feature Competition	My Love Affair with Marriage	Nominated	
Annecy International Animation Film Festival, France	June 18, 2022	Feature Films in Competition	My Love Affair with Marriage	Jury Distinction for a Feature Film	
FICG – Guadalajara International Film Festival, Mexico	June 18, 2022	Best International Animation Feature	My Love Affair with Marriage	Honorable Mention	
FEFFS Strasbourg European Fantastic Film Festival, France	October 1, 2022	Independent Animated Films Competition	My Love Affair with Marriage	Nominated	
Woodstock Film Festival, New York	October 1, 2022	Feature Narrative	Signe Baumane	Excellence in Narrative Directing	
Viborg Animation Festival, Denmark	October 2, 2022	VAF Best Feature Film 2022	My Love Affair with Marriage	Winner	
Antalya Golden Orange Film Festival, Turkey	October 8, 2022	International Feature Film Competition	My Love Affair with Marriage	Nominated	
Anim'est International Animation Film Festival, Romania	October 14, 2022	Best Feature Film	My Love Affair with Marriage	Special Mention for a Feature film	
Riga International Film Festival, Latvia	October 22, 2022	Feature Film Competition	My Love Affair with Marriage	Special Mention	
Fredrikstad Animation Festival, Norway	October 23, 2022	Nordic-Baltic Competition – Feature Films	My Love Affair with Marriage	Best Feature Film	
BIAF Bucheon International Animation Film Festival, South Korea	October 25, 2022	International Competition – Feature Film	My Love Affair with Marriage	Special Distinction Prize	
Raindance Film Festival, London, UK	November 4, 2022	Best International Feature	My Love Affair with Marriage	Nominated	
Raindance Film Festival, London, UK	November 4, 2022	Best Screenplay	Signe Baumane	Nominated	
New Chitose Airport International Animation Festival, Japan	November 6, 2022	Official Selection for Feature Films	My Love Affair with Marriage	Grand Prix for the Feature Films	
Sevilla International Film Festival, Spain	November 12, 2022	Official Selection	My Love Affair with Marriage	Nominated	
Tallinn Black Nights Film Festival, Estonia	November 27, 2022	Baltic Film Competition	My Love Affair with Marriage	Nominated	
European Film Awards, Iceland	December 10, 2022	European Animation Feature Film	My Love Affair with Marriage	Nominated	
Latvian National Film Awards, Lielais Kristaps	February 26, 2023	Animated Films Competition	My Love Affair with Marriage	Best Animation Film	
Latvian National Film Awards, Lielais Kristaps	February 26, 2023	Animated Films Competition	Signe Baumane	Best Director of an Animated Film	
Latvian National Film Awards, Lielais Kristaps	February 26, 2023	Animated Films Competition	Signe Baumane	Best Production Design of an Animated Film	
Aswan International Women Film Festival, Egypt	March 10, 2023	Feature Film Competition	Signe Baumane	Best Screenplay	
Aswan International Women Film Festival, Egypt	March 10, 2023	Feature Film Competition	My Love Affair With Marriage	Egyptian Film Critics Association Award	
Tokyo Anime Award Festival	March 13, 2023	Feature Film Competition	My Love Affair With Marriage	Nominated	
Créteil International Women's Film Festival France	March 27, 2023	Fiction Competition	My Love Affair With Marriage	Nominated	
Stuttgart International Festival of Animated Films, Germany	April 26, 2023	Honorary Trickstar Award	Signe Baumane	Honorary Trickstar Award	
Anifilm, International Festival of Animated Films, Czechia	May 7, 2023	International Competition of Feature Films	My Love Affair With Marriage	Best Feature Film for Grown-Ups	
Animafest Zagreb, Croatia	June 10, 2023	Grand Competition for Feature Films	My Love Affair With Marriage	Grand Prix for Animated Feature	
Female Eye Film Festival, Toronto, Canada	July 30, 2023	Best Feature Film Competition	My Love Affair With Marriage	Best Film	
