= Away (2019 film) =

2019 film by Gints Zilbalodis

- Latvian theatrical release poster
- Directed by: Gints Zilbalodis
- Written by: Gints Zilbalodis
- Produced by: Gints Zilbalodis
- Edited by: Gints Zilbalodis
- Music by: Gints Zilbalodis
- Production company: Bilibaba
- Distributed by: Cinema Management Group
- Release date: 4 June 2019 (Animafest Zagreb)
- Running time: 75 minutes
- Country: Latvia
- Box office: $18,961

Away (Latvian: Projām) is a 2019 Latvian animated fantasy adventure film directed by Gints Zilbalodis in his directorial debut, who also animated, wrote the screenplay and composed the score. It was animated using the computer program Maya.

== Plot ==
A teenage boy wakes up in the desert, with his parachute dangling on a tree branch, before a giant black monster appears from the dust and approaches him. The monster attempts to consume him, but he releases himself from the parachute and runs away after discovering the monster is transparent. He follows a black road toward a cave, where he finds a motorcycle and a forest by the ocean. After eating and bathing in the forest, he meets a small yellow chick and finds a backpack filled with a survival kit and a map of the island he is on. The map shows him directions to the port village on the other side of the island. With the monster still standing in front of the cave, the boy spends the night in the forest.

The next day, the boy takes the motorcycle and circles around the cave when a flock of white birds appear in the sky, causing the chick to follow the flock and get swallowed by the monster before the boy runs through the monster and rescues it. That night, he stocks up on fruits and water and rides with the chick out of the cave. Following the arches ahead of them, they cross the desert into the grasslands, with the monster slowly following them and consuming every animal on its path. The boy climbs a mountain decorated with balancing rocks and pushes a boulder down toward a wooden bridge while a white fox appears and chases the chick. He manages to destroy the bridge and send the monster falling, but the chick also falls off the cliff before a white bird guides it back to the boy. In the middle of the journey, the chick spreads its wings and bids farewell to the boy as it joins a flock of white birds.

That night, the boy has a dream of himself parachuting from a plane while being surrounded by black human-like figures resembling the monster falling to their deaths. Meanwhile, the chick and the flock circle back to the bridge to discover the monster still alive and continuing its pursuit of the boy. Days later, the boy stops and discovers the wreckage of the plane he was on several days ago. As he seeks shelter in the fuselage from the rain, the flock continues to follow the monster when all the white birds suddenly die and fall toward the monster, leaving the chick to fly to the boy and warn him of the monster's approach.

The next morning, the boy walks his motorcycle on steep inclines through snow-capped mountains with the monster tailing him. As the blizzard intensifies, he passes out from exhaustion before the monster consumes him. He finds himself falling deep inside the monster before the chick arrives and pulls him out and the monster explodes. The boy wakes up and he and the chick race downhill against an avalanche toward the port village. The boy rides the motorcycle down into the ocean to avoid the avalanche and swims to shore. After removing his goggles, he sees villagers walking toward him in the distance, the white bird flying above them.

== Release ==
Away was presented at the 2019 Annecy International Animation Film Festival, winning the Contrechamp Award. It was also presented at the Tokyo Film Festival and the London International Animation Festival.

Following the critical success of Zilbalodis' 2024 film Flow, Away was re-released in theatres in the UK and Ireland on 14 March 2025.

=== Home media ===
Away was bundled in all formats of the U.S. physical media release of Flow by The Criterion Collection.

== Reception ==
On the review aggregator website Rotten Tomatoes, 100% of 31 critics' reviews are positive, with an average rating of 8.2/10. The website's consensus reads: "A haunting and refreshing odyssey, Away's vision will whisk audiences away to its stunning oasis." Metacritic, which uses a weighted average, assigned the film a score of 78 out of 100, based on 7 critics, indicating "generally favorable" reviews. Variety praised the visual and soundtrack aspects of the movie but highlighted weaknesses in the story-telling. Some reviewers talked about the surreal nature of the work and the minimalist soundtrack. Several reviewers focused on the effort required for a single person to create an entire animated film, and the opportunities modern animation software offers to independent film-makers.

== Accolades ==
Away was nominated for the Annie Award for Music in a Feature Production at the 47th Annie Awards. The film won Best Animated Film at the 2019 Lielais Kristaps, the largest Latvian film awards. The Lielais Kristaps award jury (which included Lolita Ritmanis, Boriss Frumins, Larisa Gūtmane, Dāvis Sīmanis, Zane Balčus and Arvīds Krievs) also remarked upon the achievement of one person making an entire film, stating "When awarding the prize, the jury wants to emphasize the film's unique visual and audio fantasy world, which the author has convincingly created alone."

Accolades received by Flow
Award	Ceremony date	Category	Recipient(s)	Result	Ref.
Annecy International Animation Film Festival	2019	Contrechamps Award for Best Feature Film	Away	Won	
Lielais Kristaps	2019	Best Animated Feature Film	Away	Won	
Strasbourg European Fantastic Film Festival	2019	Best Animated Feature	Away	Won	
Strasbourg European Fantastic Film Festival	2019	Best European Fantastic Feature Film	Away	Nominated	
Annie Awards	2020	Outstanding Music in a Feature Production	Away	Nominated	
Vilnius International Film Festival	2020	New Europe – New Names Competition	Away	Nominated	
