= Baltic Tribes (film) =

2018 film directed by Lauris Ābele and Raitis Ābele

- Directed by: Lauris Ābele; Raitis Ābele
- Written by: Toms Ķencis
- Produced by: Dace Siatkovska; Kristele Pudāne; Thom Palmen
- Starring: Kaspars Aniņš
- Cinematography: Mārcis Ābele
- Music by: Kaspars Bārbals
- Production company: Tritone Studio
- Release date: 16 May 2018
- Running time: 90 minutes
- Country: Latvia

Baltic Tribes: Last Pagans of Europe (Latvian: Baltu ciltis: Eiropas pēdējie pagāni) is a 2018 Latvian popular science documentary film co-directed by Lauris Ābele and Raitis Ābele about the Baltic people during the 13th century. The film consists of historical reconstructions, live action scenes, and computer animations supplemented with a voice-over narration by scientific experts of the field.

In 2016, the film received financing from the National Film Centre's special fund for the 100th Anniversary of the Latvian Republic. In 2018, Baltic Tribes were nominated for a Lielais Kristaps National Film Festival award in the category of "Best Documentary". On 21 October 2018, Baltic Tribes premiered in the U.S. at the Baltic Film festival, ⁣which took place at the Scandinavian House.

== Plot ==
Lars, a merchant from Gotland island, travels through the lands of Curonians, Latgalians, Selonians, Semigallians, Prussians, Yatvingians, Galindians, Eastern Old Lithuanians, and Samogitians.

== Awards and nominations ==
Year	Award	Category	Result
2018	Lielais Kristaps	Best Make-Up (Aija Beata Rjabovska)	Won
2018	Lielais Kristaps	Best Documentary	Nominated
2018	Lielais Kristaps	Best Editing (Gunta Ikere)	Nominated
2018	Lielais Kristaps	Best Director of a Documentary (Raitis Ābele and Lauris Ābele)	Nominated
2018	Lielais Kristaps	Best Cinematography of a Documentary (Mārcis Ābele and Jānis Indriks)	Nominated
