= Rocks in My Pockets =

2014 Latvian film by Signe Baumane

- Film poster
- Directed by: Signe Baumane
- Written by: Signe Baumane
- Produced by: Signe Baumane
- Starring: Signe Baumane
- Music by: Kristian Sensini
- Distributed by: Zeitgeist Films; New Europe Film Sales; Locomotive Productions, Yekra, Ltd.
- Release dates: 7 July 2014 (Karlovy Vary); 22 August 2014 (Latvia)
- Running time: 88 minutes
- Countries: United States; Latvia
- Language: English
- Box office: $1.03 Million

Rocks in My Pockets (Latvian: Akmeņi manās kabatās) is a 2014 English-language Latvian adult animated autobiographical psychological tragicomedy film written, produced, directed and animated by Signe Baumane. It was originally created in English and a Latvian version was thereafter translated and produced. The film is based on true events about five women of the filmmaker's family, including herself, and their battles with depression and suicide.

It was selected as the Latvian entry for the Best Foreign Language Film at the 87th Academy Awards, but was not nominated. The soundtrack, composed by Kristian Sensini, has received a nomination at the Jerry Goldsmith Film Music Awards in the Best Movie Soundtrack category.

== Plot ==
In the late 1920s, Anna, a young Latvian woman, pretty and educated, falls in love with an adventurous entrepreneur, 30 years her senior. But with marriage comes great jealousy, and the entrepreneur hides Anna away in the forest, far from other men, where she bears him eight children. The Great Depression hits them hard. Then, during World War II, Latvia is overrun with invasions by the Soviets, then the Nazis, then the Soviets once again. Anna is a pillar of strength, defying the hardships, raising her young, teaching them survival secrets of the forest. But something inside her is terribly wrong.

Years later, Signe, a young artist, asks her father, "How did my grandmother die?" Her father is evasive. His seven siblings are evasive, as well. Signe strongly suspects that Anna committed suicide. Clues of mental illness had always leaked through the family stories. Signe has depression herself. Her suicidal fantasies get her locked away for four months in a Soviet mental institute. Three of her cousins, all women, battle madness as well. Could there be a link between Anna and the four granddaughters? Defying the stigma that silences so many, Signe takes us on a journey deep into her own depression where she looks to confront the family demons.

== Cast ==
Signe Baumane provided the narration, under the supervision of theater director Sturgis Warner. The dialogue was recorded in both English and Latvian, for the two versions of the film.

== Production ==
=== Writing ===
Signe Baumane wrote the script for Rocks in My Pockets in 2010, based on her family history. In an unconventional manner, no storyboards were created, only the script was used as a blueprint for the development of the animation.

=== Financing ===
Rocks in My Pockets was partially funded by grants from NYSCA and the Jerome Foundation in 2010. The organization Women Make Movies became a fiscal sponsor of the film, and Baumane also ran some fundraising events and an IndieGogo campaign. An additional Kickstarter campaign was initiated in 2013 to raise $42,800 in order to complete the coloring, editing, sound and music for the film. With the help of 800 backers, that campaign surpassed its goal and raised $50,780 to finish the production and help with translation, publicity and festival entry costs.

=== Filming ===
In order to create a visual style for the film that combined elements of both 2D and 3D animation, 28 sets were constructed using plywood, cardboard boxes, and paper-maché, which were then painted to resemble rooms, forests and city streets. The sets were then photographed with a digital camera as either still pictures, or in sequences to create a stop-motion effect. These digital photos then served as backgrounds for the hand-drawn characters, made in pencil on paper using a lightbox. For the entire film, approximately 30,000 drawings were created, and then scanned into Photoshop where they were colored digitally. The individual drawings were composited into sequences using AfterEffects, and output as QuickTime files, which were then edited using Final Cut Pro.

== Reception ==
=== Release ===
The film premiered in July 2014 at the Karlovy Vary International Film Festival in the Czech Republic, where it won the International Film Critics (FIPRESCI) Award, as well as a Commendation from the Ecumenical Jury. It was subsequently screened at over 130 other film festivals, including the Animator Film Festival in Poland, the Athens International Film Festival in Greece, the San Sebastian International Film Festival in Spain, and the London International Animation Festival, winning a number of awards.

The film opened in New York City on 3 September 2014, and was released in 35 U.S. cities, distributed by Zeitgeist Films. It also was released in Latvia by Locomotive Productions. "Rocks In My Pockets" is now available for streaming and downloads on a number of platforms, and is also available on DVD.

=== Critical response ===
Overall, the response of film reviewers was widely favorable. Alissa Simon described it in Variety as "boasting a narrative of extraordinary complexity and density, stuffed with irony, humor and tales-within-tales" and "a fascinating and very personal look at mental illness, as well as familial and societal dictates and dynamics." Nicolas Rapold of The New York Times wrote, "Signe Baumane presents a sharp, surprising and funny animated feature, plumbing the depths of depression via her family history. It's told with remorseless intelligence, wicked irony and an acerbic sense of humor." In The Hollywood Reporter, Boyd van Hoeij wrote, "Animated in a striking combination of real paper-maché sets and props and hand-drawn 2D figures, the film explores with wit, surreal invention and insight something left far too often undiscussed."

The film attained exceptionally high ratings among U.S. reviewers: a 100% score based on 23 reviews at Rotten Tomatoes, as of July 2019. Metacritic, which uses a weighted average, assigned the film a score of 78 out of 100, based on 10 critics, indicating "generally favorable" reviews. In December 2019, animation web-site Zippy Frames ranked Rocks in My Pockets ninth on their list of the 20 Best Animation Features of the 2010s, stating, "Coming before the #metoo movement was ever adopted, it is a surrealistic and poignant tale of empowerment that it is an essential element of this decade."

=== Accolades ===
The film has received the following awards:

- Karlovy Vary International Film Festival
  - Winner, International Film Critics (FIPRESCI) Award
  - Commendation, Ecumenical Jury
- ANIMATOR Festival, Poland
  - Best Feature Film, 2014
- Riga International Film Festival 2ANNAS, Latvia
  - Best Feature Film, 2014
- Trieste Film Festival, Italy
  - Sky Arte Award
- Anifilm Festival, Czech Republic
  - Special Mention - Best Animated Feature Film for Adults
- Vilnius International Film Festival, Lithuania
  - Special Mention, "Baltic Gaze" program
- Docs Barcelona & Medellin, Colombia
  - Best Documentary, 2015

== See also ==
- List of submissions to the 87th Academy Awards for Best Foreign Language Film
- List of Latvian submissions for the Academy Award for Best Foreign Language Film
