= The Foundation of Criminal Excellence =

2018 Latvian crime comedy film by Oskars Rupenheits

- Directed by: Oskars Rupenheits
- Written by: Oskars Rupenheits
- Produced by: Oskars Rupenheits, Juris Pīlēns, Sintija Andersone
- Starring: Lauris Kļaviņš, Andris Daugaviņš, Jana Rubīna, Māris Mičerevskis, Armands Brakmanis, Juris Riekstiņš
- Cinematography: Juris Pīlēns, Kaspars Cirsis
- Release date: 2 February 2018
- Running time: 126 minutes
- Country: Latvia
- Language: Latvian

The Foundation of Criminal Excellence (Latvian: Kriminālās ekselences fonds) is a Latvian crime comedy film released in 2018 directed by Oskars Rupenheits. Produced independently and partially financed through crowdfunding, the film was released in Latvian cinemas on 2 February 2018 and achieved significant domestic box office success. The film was nominated for Best Feature Film at the Latvian National Film Awards, Lielais Kristaps, and won the Delfi Audience Award and attracted media attention for its humorous portrayal of Latvian criminal culture.

== Plot ==
Imants Veide, a struggling television scriptwriter, attempts to develop a crime series based on authentic criminal methods. To increase the realism of his screenplay, he begins researching Latvia’s criminal underworld. Initially observing from a distance, Imants gradually becomes directly involved in illegal activities, including organizing and participating in improvised criminal schemes.

Over time, he forms connections with small-time criminals, and the group’s schemes increase in scale and complexity. Misunderstandings, internal conflicts, and growing police attention escalate as Imants becomes more involved, prioritizing his television project despite the legal risks.

The criminal enterprise ultimately collapses following police intervention, and Imants is confronted with the consequences of his actions.

== Cast ==
- Lauris Kļaviņš as Imants Veide
- Andris Daugaviņš as Harijs Kuharjonoks
- Māris Mičerevskis as Duļķis
- Armands Brakmanis as Aļģe
- Juris Riekstiņš as Vintāžs
- Jana Rubīna as the Neighbour
- Jānis Plaudis as Inkognito
- Rūdolfs Putāns as the TV Producer
- Sintija Andersone as the Intern
- Raimonds Platacis as the TV Director
- Jānis Asaris as the TV Chief
- Miks Kalējs as the TV Project Manager
- Didzis Kalējs as TV Art Director
- Andris Bekmanis as the TV Lawyer
- Māris Brokāns as Inkognito’s Right-Hand Man
- Ivars Krauklis as the Bartender
- Aivars Šterns as the Security Guard
- Edmonds Labanovskis as Zutis
- Harijs Sils as the Surgeon
- Santa Leiškalne as the Imaginary Girl
- Ojārs Daugavietis as the Imaginary Boy
- Oskars Zvejs as the Maniac Neighbour
- Edmunds Aizkalns as the Investigator
- Jānis Ielejs as the Junior Postal Worker
- Rūdis and Ozijs as Pupsiks

== Production ==
The film was produced independently and did not receive state funding. Financing was partially secured through crowdfunding initiatives. Director Oskars Rupenheits and the creative team adopted a low-budget production model, working with a cast that included mostly non-professional actors. The film’s independent production model was noted in Latvian media coverage.

== Release ==
Kriminālās ekselences fonds premiered in Latvian cinemas on 2 February 2018. Prior to release, it was promoted through teaser materials and media coverage.

Within three weeks of its premiere, the film attracted more than 30,000 viewers. It later became the most-watched Latvian film in the history of the cinema Kino Citadele.

== Reception ==
The film received extensive coverage in Latvian media, including discussions of its independent production model and unconventional casting. According to reporting by the National Film Centre of Latvia, audience reactions were compiled and published following its release, including comments from public figures such as Toms Grēviņš, Artis Volfs, Intars Rešetins, Ieva Adamss, Shipsea, Dita Rietuma, Renārs Zeltiņš, and Marta Kukarāne.

Several lines from the film gained popularity and were widely quoted in Latvian popular culture following its release.

== Awards and nominations ==
The Foundation of Criminal Excellence was nominated for Best Feature Film at the 2018 Latvian National Film Awards, Lielais Kristaps. The film also won the Delfi Audience Award, reflecting its popularity with audiences.

== Related projects ==
Members of the creative team later collaborated on additional Latvian film projects, including Tumšzilais Evaņģēlijs.
