= Gints Zilbalodis =

Latvian filmmaker (born 1994)

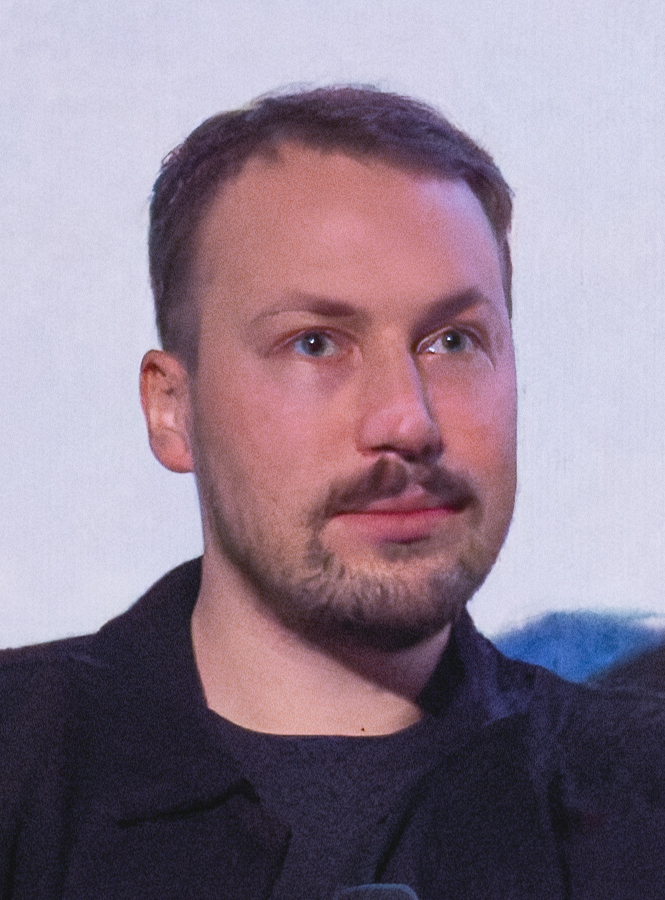
- Zilbalodis in 2025
- Born: 13 April 1994 (age 32); Riga, Latvia
- Occupations: Animator, film director, composer
- Notable work: Away (2019); Flow (2024)

Gints Zilbalodis (born 13 April 1994) is a Latvian filmmaker, animator and composer. A prominent figure of Latvian animation and the global independent animation industry, Zilbalodis's films are considered minimalist and often explore themes of journey, isolation, survival against nature, and the power of collaboration and camaraderie.

Zilbalodis is best known for his works of animated adventure films Away (2019) and Flow (2024), the latter of which earned him accolades including an Academy Award, a Golden Globe Award, and two Annie Awards, with nominations for two British Academy Film Awards, making him and co-producer Matīss Kaža the first Latvians to win an Academy Award.

== Early and personal life ==
Gints Zilbalodis is the child of a painter mother and a sculptor father. He gained interest in filmmaking as a medium for expressing his thoughts; he stated that he struggles to express his emotions externally. He chose not to attend university as Latvia had no animation schools, instead teaching himself animation, sound design, and even musical composition.

Zilbalodis has cited the works of Hayao Miyazaki, Steven Spielberg, Wes Anderson, Akira Kurosawa, Martin Scorsese, Hal Ashby, Sergio Leone, Jacques Tati, Alfonso Cuarón, and Paul Thomas Anderson, as his major influences.

== Career ==
After directing seven short films, Zilbalodis' debut feature, Away, premiered in 2019. Written, directed, and scored by Zilbalodis himself, Away was awarded the Contrechamps prize at the Annecy International Animation Film Festival and was nominated for an Annie Award for Outstanding Achievement for Music in a Feature Production.

Zilbalodis' second feature film, Flow, was selected to screen in the Un Certain Regard portion of the 2024 Cannes Film Festival. Unlike his past works, Flow marked the first time Zilbalodis collaborated with other staff, with animation co-produced by Sacrebleu Productions of France and Take Five of Belgium. It went on to win numerous awards worldwide, including Best Animated Feature at the 97th Academy Awards and in the same category at the 82nd Golden Globe Awards, while receiving nominations for two British Academy Film Awards and the Academy Award for Best International Feature Film. Due to the success of Flow in Latvia, Zilbalodis was honoured as "Rigan of the Year" in 2024.

Zilbalodis later announced he would make another film, Limbo, scheduled for 2028.

== Filmography ==
=== Short films ===
- Rush (2010)
- Aqua (2012)
- Clarity (2012)
- Priorities (2014)
- Followers (2014)
- Inaudible (2015)
- Oasis (2017)

=== Feature films ===
- Away (2019)
- Flow (2024)
- Limbo (TBA)

== Awards and nominations ==
=== Away ===
Year	Award	Category	Nominated work	Result	Ref.
2019	Annecy International Animation Film Festival	Contrechamps Award for Best Feature Film	Away	Won	
2019	Lielais Kristaps	Best Animated Feature Film	Away	Won	
2019	Strasbourg European Fantastic Film Festival	Best Animated Feature	Away	Won	
2019	Strasbourg European Fantastic Film Festival	Best European Fantastic Feature Film	Away	Nominated	
2020	Annie Awards	Outstanding Music in a Feature Production	Away	Nominated	
2020	Vilnius International Film Festival	New Europe – New Names Competition	Away	Nominated	

=== Flow ===
Selected awards and nominations received for Flow
Year	Award	Category	Nominated work	Result	Ref.
2024	Cannes Film Festival	Un Certain Regard	Flow	Nominated	
2024	European Film Awards	Best Animated Feature Film	Flow	Won	
2025	Academy Awards	Best Animated Feature	Flow	Won	
2025	Academy Awards	Best International Feature Film	Flow	Nominated	
2025	Annie Awards	Outstanding Directing in a Feature Production	Flow	Nominated	
2025	Annie Awards	Outstanding Writing in a Feature Production	Flow	Won	
2025	BAFTA Awards	Best Animated Film	Flow	Nominated	
2025	BAFTA Awards	Best Children's & Family Film	Flow	Nominated	
2025	César Awards	Best Animated Film	Flow	Won	
2025	Golden Globe Awards	Best Animated Feature Film	Flow	Won	

== See also ==
- Independent animation
- Minimalist film
