= Riga International Short Film Festival 2ANNAS =

Film festival held in Latvia

Riga International Short Film Festival 2ANNAS (Latvian: Rīgas Starptautiskais īsfilmu festivāls 2ANNAS) is the only annual short film festival in Latvia. Founded by its current director Viesturs Grazdanovics (Viesturs Graždanovičs) in 1996, the festival has since taken place every year in late May, until in 2013 it moved to late October in Riga (Latvia). Screenings take place in several film theaters as well as popular alternative entertainment venues and non-conventional screening venues. Originally created to promote short film, the festival has widened its range by adding a feature film competition program in its 2014 selection.

== History ==
The first 2ANNAS film festival took place in 1996 at the Center of Creative Learning ANNAS 2 (CCL) as the only youth and experimental film festival in Latvia. The program consisted of only 10 short films and its goal was to support and promote interest in film art in Latvia.

Gradually the festival grew, and in 2005 the film selection crossed the Latvian border, thus 2ANNAS became an international film festival. The transition led to a change of strategy for the festival and in 2006 it highlighted the new criteria for festival selections - quality, flexibility, innovation and openness. In 2007 2ANNAS introduced many changes and updates. One of them is the sub-festival "Green Anna" - an international competition program consisting of short films made by filmmakers under 18. Another addition to the festival was a separate Baltic competition program for filmmakers from Estonia, Latvia and Lithuania, which is closely connected to the foundation of the Baltic Film and Media School in Tallinn (Estonia) in 2005. The festival also adapted a one-week event format.

In about ten years the festival evolved from a small independent event into one of the biggest film festivals in Latvia with a film selection consisting of 31 short films from 9 countries (2007). In 2008 the festival started to position itself as the largest short film festival in the Baltics. Festival's 2009 selection consists of 42 short films from 18 countries.

== Competition programmes ==
International competition started alongside the festival's transition from a national to an international film festival in 2005. It offers a selection of high-quality short films that have already gained recognition or are on their way to fame. Short films represent all genres (fiction, animation, documentary, experimental, music video, etc.). Every year 2ANNAS competition program includes short films that have been nominated or awarded in high-rank film events such as Cannes Film Festival, Berlinale and the Academy Awards.

Baltic competition was created as a separate competition section due to the increasing film quality in the Baltics in 2007. It offers the latest work of Baltic directors which reveals the short film genres.

Green Anna competition also created in 2007 for Latvian and international films and videos created by filmmakers under the age of 18. The competition however lived to its end in 2009.

== Jury ==
The Festival Jury includes filmmakers, theoreticians, film critics and journalists, film festival program representatives, art historians, producers, etc. from both Latvia and other countries.

== Winners ==
In 2007 Riga International Short Film Festival 2ANNAS establishes cooperation with the leading system integrator company in the Baltic states "Hannu Pro" which gives the opportunity to award the winner of the festival main award "Grand Prix Golden Anna" with a cash prize.

Grand Prix Golden Anna winners

Year	Film	Director	Country
2007	Safety-matches	Didzis Eglītis	Latvia
2008	Reality show	Federico Schmucler	Mexico
2009	Orgesticulanismus	Labaye Mathieu	Belgium
2010	Echo	Magnus von Horn	Poland
2011	The Cage	Adrian Sitaru	Romania
2012	Il Capo	Yuri Ancarani	Italy
2013	Plug & Play	Michael Frei	Switzerland

== Related events ==
Latvian tour:

The details differ every year, but the concept stays the same: the festival team takes a tour around Latvia and shows some of the films from previous year's competition to promote the festival and to educate the audience about the latest development in the film genre.

Special programs:

Alongside competition programs, 2ANNAS likes to delight its audience with guest programs. In 2013 the festival decided to take it more seriously and created a special non-competition program.

2013' program WOMAN: AN AVANT GARDIST. A HOUSEWIFE. A PROSTITUTE. focused on a woman not only as a filmmaker, but also as an actress, a muse, an inspiration, an object of research, an idol, a legend, a queen and a servant.

In 2014 the festival has decided to go even further and sets its eye upon feature films. The program TRANSGRESSORS consists of young filmmakers' debut work (first or second film) and focus on the films and filmmakers that continuously challenge the way we as the audience engage with the film.
