= Flow (2024 film) =

2024 animated film by Gints Zilbalodis

- International theatrical release poster
- Latvian: Straume
- Directed by: Gints Zilbalodis
- Written by: Gints Zilbalodis; Matīss Kaža
- Produced by: Matīss Kaža; Gints Zilbalodis; Ron Dyens; Gregory Zalcman
- Cinematography: Gints Zilbalodis
- Edited by: Gints Zilbalodis
- Music by: Gints Zilbalodis; Rihards Zaļupe
- Production companies: Sacrebleu Productions; Take Five; Dream Well Studio
- Distributed by: Baltic Content Media (Latvia); UFO Distribution (France); Le Parc Distribution (Belgium)
- Release dates: 22 May 2024 (Cannes); 29 August 2024 (Latvia); 30 October 2024 (France); 15 January 2025 (Belgium)
- Running time: 85 minutes
- Countries: Latvia; France; Belgium
- Budget: €3.5 million
- Box office: €50 million

Flow (Latvian: Straume) is a 2024 independent animated dystopian adventure film directed by Gints Zilbalodis, written and produced by Zilbalodis and Matīss Kaža. A Latvian, French, and Belgian co-production, it features no dialogue and follows a cat trying to survive along with other animals in a seemingly post-apocalyptic world as the water level dramatically rises.

Production of Flow started in 2019 and lasted five and a half years. The animation was done using the free and open-source software Blender. Jacques Tati and Future Boy Conan served as inspirations for the film. No storyboards were used for the production, and there are no deleted scenes.

Flow premiered on 22 May 2024 at the Cannes Film Festival in the Un Certain Regard section and was released in Latvian theaters on 29 August. It received critical acclaim and broke several Latvian box-office records, becoming the most-viewed film in Latvian theaters in history. At the 97th Academy Awards, Flow won Best Animated Feature. It was also nominated for Best International Feature Film as Latvia's submission, becoming the first film from Latvia to receive an Academy Award nomination and a win. Flow also won the Golden Globe Award for Best Animated Feature Film. Both of the award statuettes were put on display at the Latvian National Museum of Art.

== Plot ==
A dark grey cat wanders through a forest. A pack of dogs arrives by the river and chases the cat after it takes a fish the dogs fought over. The cat escapes but notices a deer stampede before it is caught in a massive flood. The cat and dogs survive the flood and reach higher ground. A yellow Labrador Retriever from the pack follows the cat to its abandoned cabin with wooden cat sculptures. They both notice the water level rising, and the Labrador joins the other dogs on a passing boat. As the flood consumes the cabin, the cat climbs atop a giant cat statue until the waters reach the top of the statue's head. As the rising water completely submerges the statue, the cat jumps into an approaching sailboat with a capybara aboard.

The next morning, as the boat sails through a partially submerged forest, the cat goes overboard and begins to sink while trying to avoid a white secretarybird. A mutated whale saves it from drowning, but another secretarybird seizes it, and during the flight, the cat catches a glimpse of massive stone pillars in the distance. The secretarybird then releases the cat over the boat. Soon after, as the water level continues to rise, the capybara invites a ring-tailed lemur to hop aboard with its basket of trinkets, to which the lemur adds a mirror found on the boat. While sleeping, the cat has a nightmare where it is being circled by a herd of deer and looks to the massive stone pillars before being swept away by a flood. Later that day, the three animals land on shore and are joined by the Labrador. They encounter a flock of secretarybirds that show hostility toward them, causing the cat to run away. The younger secretarybird that first encountered the cat pleads with the leader to spare its life, only to lose in a duel and have its wing injured before the flock abandons it. With a diminished ability to fly, the secretarybird joins the crew.

The crew arrives at a half-submerged city near the base of the massive stone pillars. The Labrador takes the lemur's glass float to the secretarybird to play fetch, but the secretarybird kicks it off the boat. The lemur gets angry and starts fighting with the secretarybird, who is steering the boat. Due to loss of control, the boat's mast is caught in a tree. The whale breaches out of the water, producing waves that free the boat from the tree. After learning from the capybara, the cat improves its ability to swim and catch fish. Later, the crew sees the other dogs stranded in a bell tower and rescues them.

As the boat sails through the huge stone pillars during a heavy storm, the secretarybird flies away. The cat falls off the boat but swims ashore. It climbs the stairs to the top of a stone pillar and finds the secretarybird there, on a labyrinth-like carving on the floor. For a short duration, gravity vanishes, and a bright portal opens above them. They are both temporarily weightless, but the cat floats back to the ground, while the secretarybird flies toward the light and disappears.

The cat rushes down the stairs and tries to swim back to the boat, but it is too far. It finds the lemur's glass float and uses it to stay afloat. The water level drops quickly as massive fault lines open in the earth, draining the water. While roaming through the forest, the cat finds the lemur, and they find the boat hanging on a tree soon after. The dogs jump off the boat, but just as the capybara is about to exit, the tree begins to fracture. The cat climbs the tree and passes the boat's rope to the lemur and dogs, who pull the boat toward them. When a rabbit scampers by, the other dogs abandon the Labrador and its friends to chase it. The cat falls but is caught by the capybara. They both manage to jump off the boat before it falls with the tree into a ravine below. Just as the crew celebrates, another deer stampede occurs. The cat flees but stops when it comes upon the whale beached in the forest. The cat comforts the whale and looks at the massive stone pillars. Saddened by the whale's loss, the cat sees its reflection in a puddle of water as it is joined by its friends.

In a post-credits scene, a whale is seen surfacing on the ocean.

== Production ==
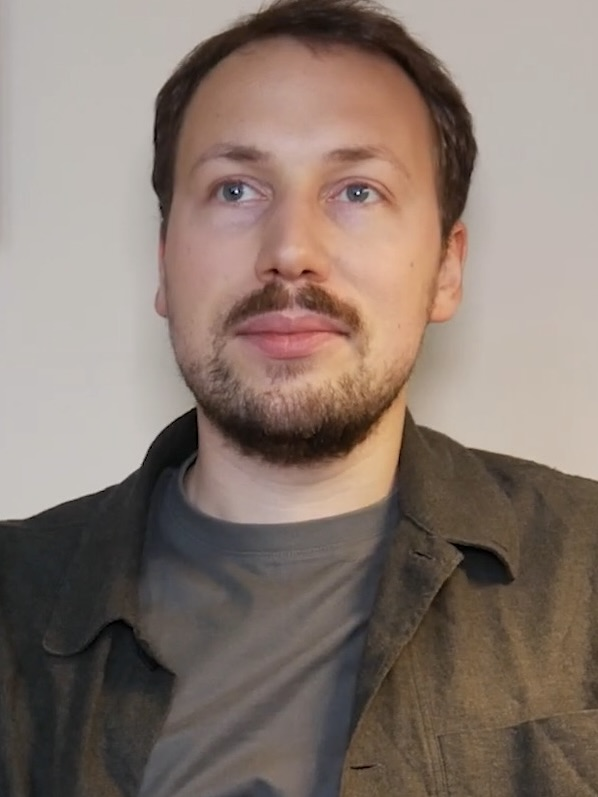
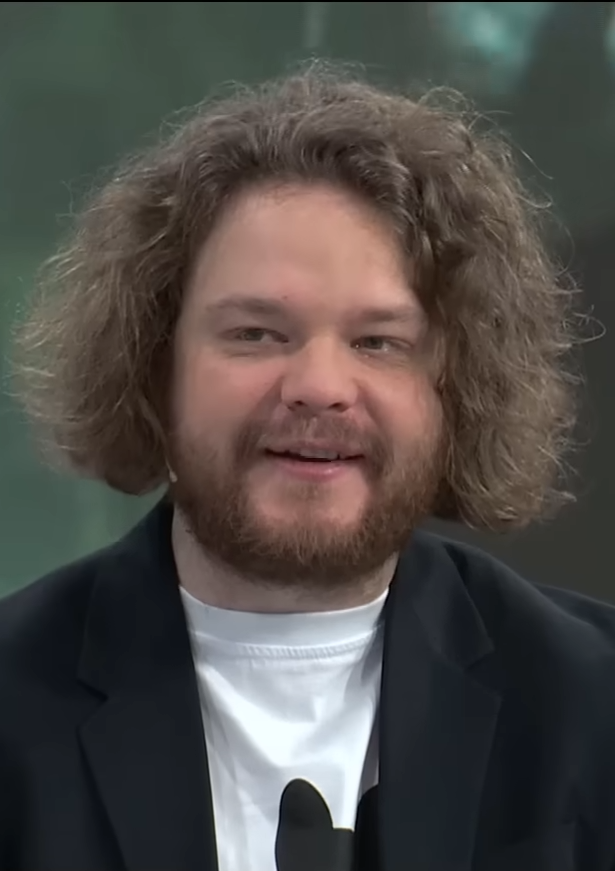
Gints Zilbalodis and Matīss Kaža worked together for the film.

In 2012, Zilbalodis produced Aqua, a short film about a cat overcoming its fear of the ocean. The premise of Aqua served as the basis for Flow. Zilbalodis used Maya to animate his previous works up to his 2019 film Away. That year, he switched to Blender, due to its real-time renderer EEVEE, and used it to animate Flow.

Production started in 2019, and it took Zilbalodis and his production team five-and-a-half years to complete Flow. The film features no dialogue, and Zilbalodis stated that he was inspired by Jacques Tati, as well as the anime series Future Boy Conan. No storyboards were used, and Zilbalodis instead placed the animals into the scene and "explored them with the camera". There are no deleted scenes from the film.

Take Five and Sacrebleu Productions joined the production in 2022, and worked on character animation and sound. While Flow was still in development, materials from the film were presented at the 2022 Cartoon Movie forum in Bordeaux. The film was produced with financial support from the National Film Centre of Latvia, the State Culture Capital Foundation of Latvia, the Centre national du cinéma et de l'image animée, ARTE France, Eurimages, RTBF, and the Belgian Tax Shelter. Animation for the film was completed in France and Belgium.

An episode of the LTV documentary series Aizliegtais paņēmiens about the film's production was released in March 2025.

=== Animals ===
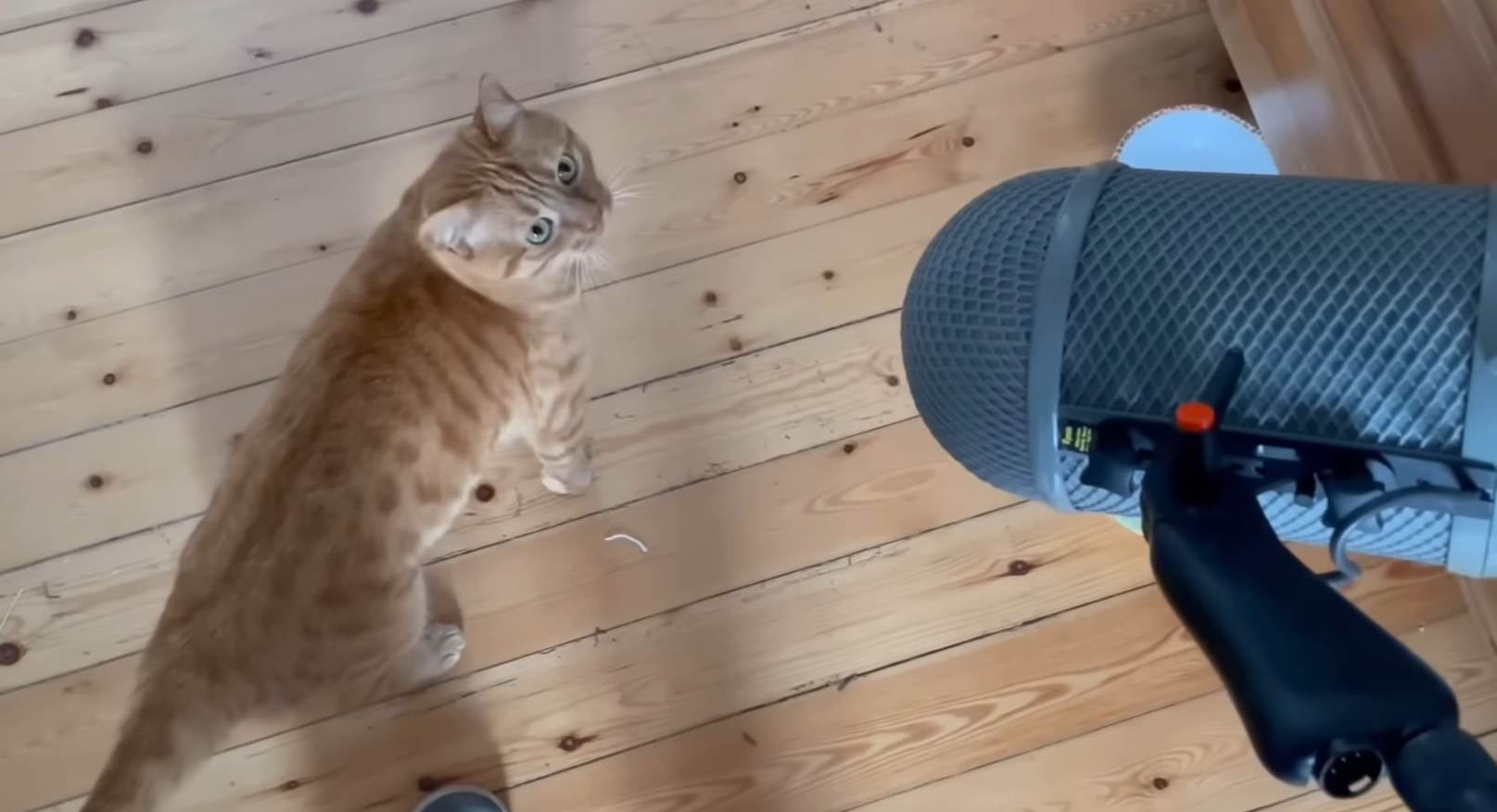
Miut, the cat of sound designer Gurwal Coïc-Gallas, provided the voice of the cat in Flow

Capybaras and lemurs were studied at zoos, such as the Izu Shaboten Zoo in Japan. The whale was originally supposed to be based on a real whale, but it was redesigned to look more mythical. Additionally, the secretarybird was originally planned to be a seagull but was changed because the seagull was too small. The boat used by the main characters was inspired by Mediterranean feluccas.

=== Sound design ===
Sound designer Gurwal Coïc-Gallas used actual animal sounds for each character depicted in the film. Coïc-Gallas's cat, named Miut, served as the voice of the cat. Coïc-Gallas and Zilbalodis felt that the high-pitched and unpleasant sound of an actual capybara being tickled did not properly represent the calm and peaceful capybara in the film. They considered using a moose or llama before they selected the sound of a baby camel instead. The sound of a tiger pitched down was used for the whale.

== Music ==
Flow: Original Motion Picture Soundtrack

Soundtrack album by Gints Zilbalodis and Rihards Zaļupe
- Released: 1 November 2024
- Genre: Film score
- Length: 53:51
- Label: Milan
- Producer: Gints Zilbalodis

The film's score was composed by Zilbalodis and Rihards Zaļupe, and mixed by Mikko Raita. Seven hours of music was composed by Zilbalodis and 50 minutes of it was used in the film. The soundtrack was released on streaming media platforms by Milan Records on 1 November 2024.

All tracks are written by Gints Zilbalodis and Rihards Zaļupe.

No.	Title	Length
1.	"Home"	2:04
2.	"Dog Chase"	1:34
3.	"Panic"	0:59
4.	"Flood"	5:24
5.	"Capybara"	0:48
6.	"Unexpected Visitor"	0:32
7.	"Lemur"	2:07
8.	"Bananas"	1:27
9.	"Deer Cyclone"	1:23
10.	"Windmill Island"	2:11
11.	"Birds"	3:45
12.	"Outcast"	2:26
13.	"Showing Off"	0:59
14.	"Abandoned City"	2:24
15.	"Splash"	1:38
16.	"Fishing"	3:05
17.	"Storm"	2:03
18.	"Flow Away"	4:33
19.	"Forest Emerging"	1:55
20.	"Amphitheater"	1:51
21.	"Following"	3:36
22.	"Reflection"	3:29
23.	"Acceptance"	2:43
Total length:		53:51

== Release ==
Flow was selected to premiere in the Un Certain Regard section of the 2024 Cannes Film Festival on 22 May 2024. It was the first Latvian film shown in that section since The Shoe in 1998. It was also shown at the 2024 Annecy International Animation Film Festival, where it was awarded the Jury Award, the Audience Award, and the Gan Foundation Award for Distribution in the Feature Film category. Flow was submitted to the 2024 Ottawa International Animation Festival, where it received the Grand Prize for Feature Animation. The film was also screened at the 2024 Toronto International Film Festival and 2024 Vancouver International Film Festival. The film was invited to 'Open Cinema' at the 29th Busan International Film Festival and was screened at the outdoor theater in October 2024. Flow was screened in competition at the 2024 Melbourne International Film Festival, where it won the Special Jury Award.

Flow premiered at the Splendid Palace cinema in Riga, Latvia, on 28 August 2024 and was released nationwide the following day by Baltic Content Media. UFO Distribution released the film theatrically in France on 30 October 2024. It was given a limited release in the United States by Janus Films and Sideshow in New York and Los Angeles on 22 November 2024, before being released to 200 theatres on 6 December. The film was released in Belgium on 15 January 2025 by Le Parc Distribution. It opened in 800 theatres in Mexico on 1 January 2025. PVR Inox Pictures released Flow in India on 28 February 2025. Madman Entertainment released the film theatrically in Australia on 20 March 2025.

A board game based on the film was released in January 2025. HarperCollins published a picture book adaptation of the film on 2 December 2025.

=== Home media ===
On 4 Mar 2025, Flow was released on Blu-ray by Fnac. In the UK, it was released on 4K Blu-ray by Curzon Film on 30 June 2025. The Blu-ray release includes the short films Aqua and Priorities and the making-of documentary Dream Cat. In the United States, Flow was released in 4K Blu-ray by The Criterion Collection on 23 September 2025. The Blu-ray includes roughly the same features as the UK release but also added Zilbalodis' 2019 debut feature Away.

== Reception ==
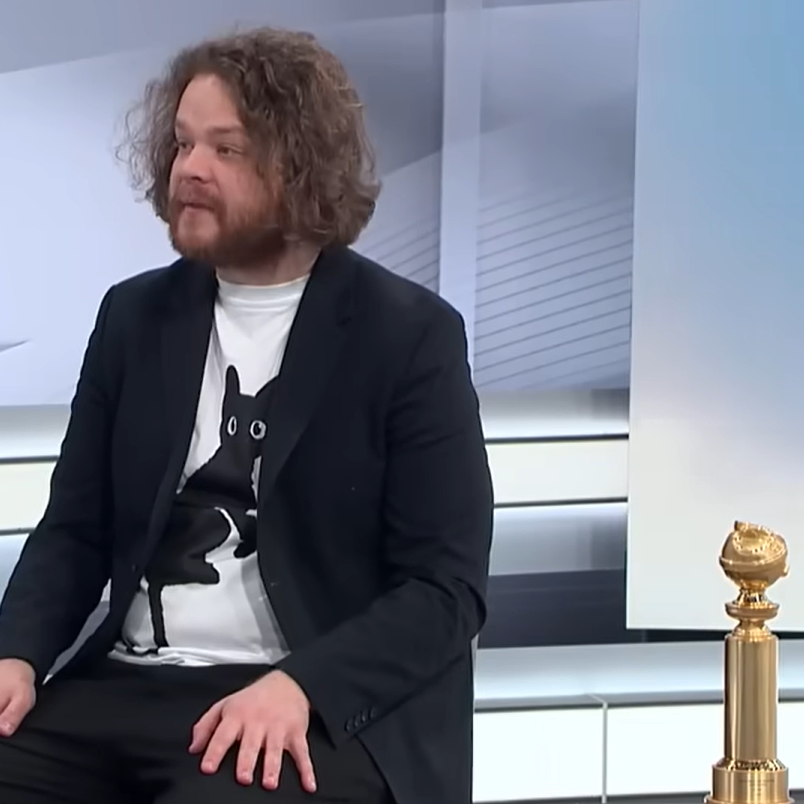
Co-producer Matīss Kaža with the film's Golden Globe trophy

=== Box office ===
Flow has become the most-viewed theatrical film in Latvian history. Over 306,000 tickets were sold in Latvia, overtaking Blizzard of Souls to become the most attended film in the country's history.

Flow became Janus Films' highest-grossing film in the U.S. with US$4 million in ticket sales, surpassing the domestic earnings of Drive My Car (2021). As of June 2025, it had grossed over €50 million at the global box office. The film became a success in Mexico, where it grossed over US$6.3 million in ticket sales. Zilbalodis celebrated the success in the country by screening the film for free at the Zócalo in Mexico City on 30 April 2025 in front of 15,000 people.

=== Critical response ===
On the review aggregator website Rotten Tomatoes, 97% of 193 critics' reviews are positive. The website's consensus reads: "Thanks to its innovative animation and mature themes, going with this Flow proves irresistible." Metacritic, which uses a weighted average, assigned the film a score of 87 out of 100, based on 31 critics, indicating "universal acclaim".

Writing for The New York Times, Calum Marsh noted that "the animals act like animals, and that gives their adventure an authenticity that, in moments of both delight and peril, makes the emotion that much more powerful." Jake Coyle of the Associated Press called Flow the best animated film of 2024, writing that the "computer generated animation adds to its dreamy, curiously real surrealism."

Christian Blauvelt, writing for IndieWire, gave Flow an A rating and praised it as "brimming with sentiment but not sentimentality" and compared its limited dialogue and non-anthropomorphized animals to Spirit: Stallion of the Cimarron. Actor and director Bill Hader named Flow his favorite film of 2024, saying that he watched it three times and that it made him want to get a cat despite being allergic to them. In June 2025, IndieWire ranked the film at number 26 on its list of "The 100 Best Movies of the 2020s (So Far)." In July 2025, it was one of the films voted for the "Readers' Choice" edition of The New York Times' list of "The 100 Best Movies of the 21st Century," finishing at number 224.

=== Accolades ===
Flow was the first Latvian production to win an Academy Award and a Golden Globe. It was also the first independent film to win the Academy Award for Best Animated Feature, and the second animated film to be nominated for both the Academy Award for Best International Feature Film and Best Animated Feature after Flee. The film's Golden Globe Award and Academy Award were featured at the Latvian National Museum of Art. 15,000 people came over ten days to see the Golden Globe award. The film's win for the Independent Spirit Award for Best International Film marked the first time an animated feature to win an Independent Spirit Award for any category.

== Legacy ==
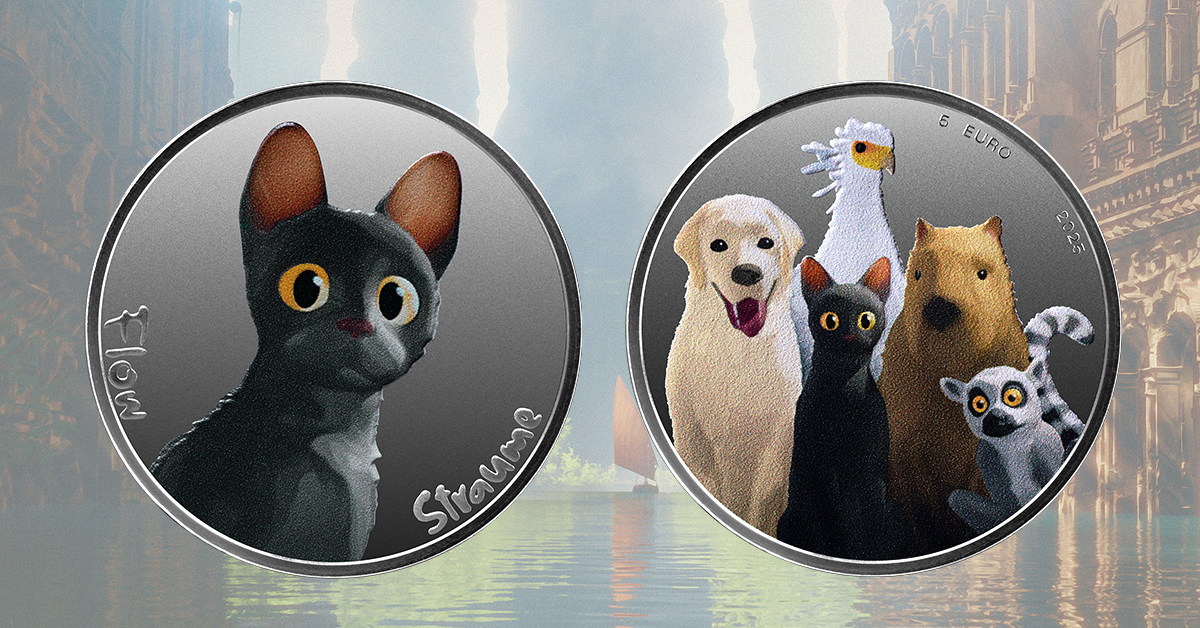
A commemorative silver coin issued by the Bank of Latvia depicting characters from the film

Due to the film's popularity in Latvia, a statue of the cat from Flow was installed in Riga. It was initially installed outside of the Freedom Monument, and was moved to the Brīvības Square in April 2025. Statues of the lemur, capybara, and dog from the film were also installed in other parks in Riga in 2025. In addition, the national Latvian post service, Latvijas Pasts released a limited edition commemorative postage stamp dedicated to the film. Zilbalodis was honored as "Riga Citizen of the Year" in 2024. Due to the success of Flow, the Latvian film industry saw increased investment. Zilbalodis said that he had been approached to create a sequel to Flow but chose not to make one, instead focusing on a different project with dialogue titled Limbo.

In December 2025, the Bank of Latvia issued a commemorative silver collector coin featuring characters from the film. The coin had a limited mintage of six thousand.

== See also ==
- List of Latvian submissions for the Academy Award for Best International Feature Film
- List of submissions to the 97th Academy Awards for Best International Feature Film
- Minimalist film – Cinema related to the philosophy of minimalism

== Works cited ==
=== News ===
- Aguilar, Carlos (12 February 2025). "One Wordless, Animated Cat Movie. Two Oscar Nominations". The New York Times. Archived from the original on 14 February 2025.
- Blauvelt, Christian (2 March 2025). "'Flow' Wins Best Animated Feature Oscar, the First Indie Film to Do So". IndieWire. Archived from the original on 3 March 2025.
- Blauvelt, Christian; Perella, Vincent (5 January 2025). "The Budget for Animated Hit 'Flow' Was So Tight, the Film Has No Deleted Scenes". IndieWire. Archived from the original on 10 January 2025.
- Blauvelt, Christian (4 December 2024). "Watch the Director of Flow Go Behind the Scenes of the Best Animated Movie of the Year". IndieWire. Archived from the original on 17 December 2024.
- Brikmane, Zane (5 March 2025). "Flow's Oscar to be displayed at Latvian Art Museum". Public Broadcasting of Latvia.
- Desowitz, Bill (18 November 2024). "'Flow' Director Gints Zilbalodis Doesn't Need Dialogue to Tell His Stories". IndieWire. Archived from the original on 10 January 2025.
- Dockterman, Eliana (2 March 2025). "The 2025 Oscar Winners Who Made History". Time. Archived from the original on 3 March 2025.
- "'Flow' becomes most viewed film ever in Latvian cinemas". Public Broadcasting of Latvia. 26 January 2025.
- Gularte, Alejandra (2 March 2025). "How Flow's Filmmakers Decided a Tiger Could Voice a Whale". Vulture. Archived from the original on 5 March 2025.
- Shachat, Sarah (29 November 2024). "'Flow' Doesn't Have Dialogue — But Its Sound Design Speaks Volumes". IndieWire. Archived from the original on 10 January 2025.
- "Surprise win of Flow brings 1st ever Oscar to Latvia, sparking national pride". Canadian Broadcasting Corporation. 3 March 2025. Archived from the original on 20 March 2025.

=== Web ===
- Abbatescianni, Davide (3 May 2024). "Gints Zilbalodis's sophomore feature, Flow, set to world-premiere in Cannes' Un Certain Regard". Cineuropa. Archived from the original on 3 May 2024.
- Siddi, Francesco (22 January 2025). "Making Flow – Interview with director Gints Zilbalodis". Blender Foundation. Archived from the original on 14 February 2025.
- "Flow, as seen by Gints Zilbalodis". Cannes Film Festival. 22 May 2024. Archived from the original on 14 February 2025.
