= Ansis Bērziņš =

Latvian film producer and director (1940–2021)

Ansis Bērziņš (16 February 1940 – 14 September 2021) was a Latvian film producer and director, known as one of the first animation film producers of Latvia. Together with the director Roze Stiebra, Bērziņš was awarded the Latvian film prize Lielais Kristaps in 2017, for lifetime contribution to Latvian cinema.
