= Matīss Kaža =

Latvian filmmaker (born 1995)

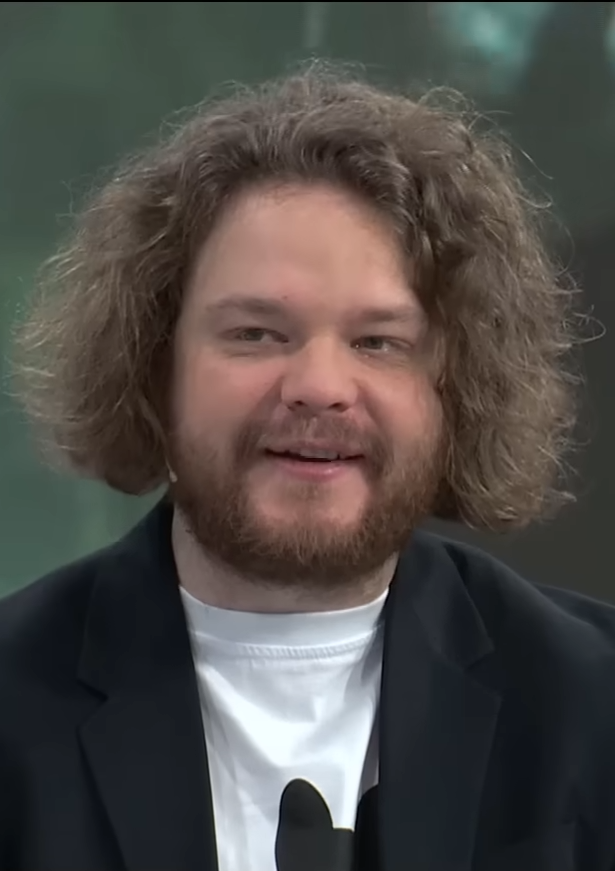
- Kaža in 2025
- Born: Matīss Kaža; August 31, 1995 (age 31); Stockholm, Sweden
- Citizenship: Sweden; Latvia; United States
- Education: New York University (BFA); American Film Institute
- Years active: 2012–present

Matīss Kaža (born August 31, 1995) is a Latvian filmmaker. He is best known for co-writing and co-producing the 2024 animated film Flow. For Flow, Kaža won the Academy Award for Best Animated Feature, making him the category's youngest ever winner at the age of 29.

Before Flow, Kaža wrote and directed documentary films such as Month of the Witches (2012) and One Ticket Please (2017) as well as directing Latvian-language drama films during his career such as Neon Spring and The Taste of Water (both in 2022). He is the founder of the production company Trickster Pictures and has worked as a lead producer at Gints Zilbalodis's Riga-based animation company Dream Well Studio.

== Early life and education ==
Matīss Kaža was born on August 31, 1995, in Stockholm, Sweden, to journalist Juris Kaža and film director Una Celma. He was mostly raised in Riga, Latvia before moving to the United States. He holds Latvian, Swedish, and American citizenship.

Kaža attended and graduated New York University with a degree of Bachelor of Fine Arts (BFA) in Film & Television, and has been a directing fellow at the AFI Conservatory.

== Awards ==
Year	Award	Category	Nominated work	Result	Ref.
2024	Cannes Film Festival	Un Certain Regard	Flow	Nominated	
2024	European Film Awards	Best Animated Feature Film	Flow	Won	
2025	Academy Awards	Best Animated Feature	Flow	Won	
2025	Annie Awards	Outstanding Writing in a Feature Production	Flow	Won	
2025	BAFTA Awards	Best Animated Film	Flow	Nominated	
2025	BAFTA Awards	Best Children's & Family Film	Flow	Nominated	
2025	César Awards	Best Animated Film	Flow	Won	
2025	Golden Globe Awards	Best Animated Feature Film	Flow	Won	
