= Signe Baumane =

Latvian animator and illustrator

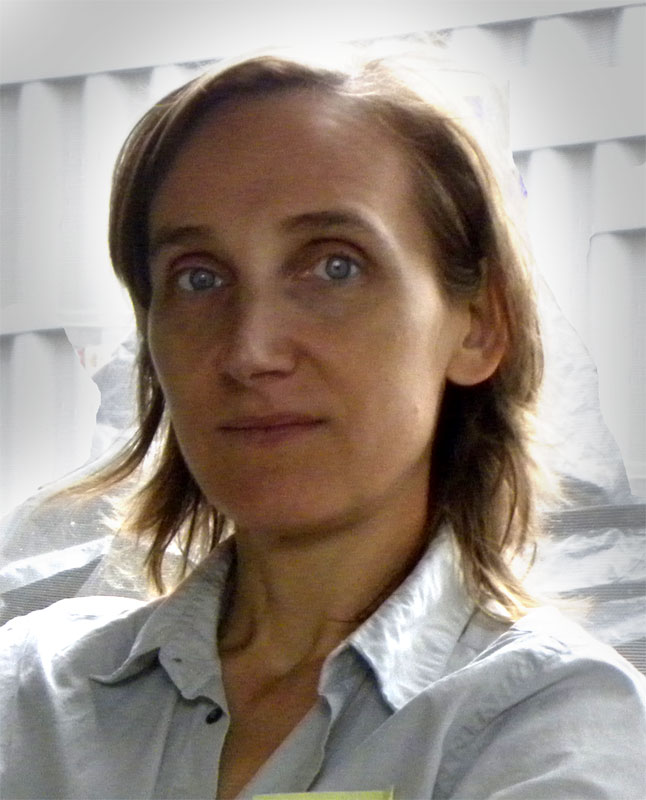
- Image of Signe Baumane from 2009
- Born: Auce, Latvia
- Education: Moscow State University (1989)
- Notable work: Rocks in My Pockets (2014)
- Website: signebaumane.com

Signe Baumane is a Latvian animator, artist, illustrator and writer, currently living and working in New York City. She is a member of the Academy of Motion Picture Arts and Sciences, she was a 2005 Fellow in Film of the New York Foundation for the Arts. She is also a teacher, having taught animation at the Pratt Institute from 2000 to 2002.

== Early life and education ==
Signe Baumane was born in Auce, Latvia, and grew up in Tukums, Latvia and Sakhalin Island. She was married to Yuriy Gavrilenko, an artist and impresario, and Lasse Persson, a Swedish animator. She began writing for publication at the age of 14. She attended Moscow University and graduated in 1989 with a BA in philosophy.

== Career ==
She began working as an animator in 1989, taking a position as animator at Dauka Animation Studio. Over the next several years, local television aired several animated commercials that Baumane had designed and directed. In 1991 she produced her first animated film, The Witch and the Cow, of which she was the scriptwriter, director, designer, and animator.

Following a two-year stint as a children's book illustrator in Moscow, she returned to animation, illustration and stage design in 1993 in Riga. She relocated to New York City in September 1995, finding work with Bill Plympton as production manager, color stylist, and cel painter the following January.

In 1998 she resumed work as an independent animator, making several films. Two of these, Woman and Veterinarian were made during visits to Latvia. The remainder were made in New York City.

Signe has initiated and curated a number of independent animation programs and along with Patrick Smith and Bill Plympton is the organizing core of Square Footage Films, a group of New York independent animators that self-publishes and distributes DVDs of their own work.

Besides doing animation, Baumane is a fine artist, and has produced numerous paintings and sculptures, and has also worked as an illustrator for children's books.

Her films have been screened at important film festivals such as Annecy, Tribeca, Sundance, Berlin, Ottawa, Venice and they have received numerous awards. In 2017, Baumane was awarded a prestigious Guggenheim Fellowship for her exceptional creative ability in the arts.

=== Rocks in My Pockets ===
Baumane's animation Rocks in My Pockets is a feature-length autobiographical animation that explores the depression that has haunted three generations of women in her family. Rocks in My Pockets was selected as the Latvian entry for Best Foreign Language Film at the 87th Academy Awards but was not nominated.

The project received early funding from NYSCA, The Jerome Foundation, and Women Make Movies, the project's fiscal sponsor. In 2013 after two years of working on the project Baumane and team raised another $50,000 on Kickstarter.

The film premiered in July 2014 at the Karlovy Vary International Film Festival in the Czech Republic, where it won the International Film Critics (FIPRESCI) Award, as well as a Commendation from the Ecumenical Jury. It was subsequently screened at over 130 other film festivals, including the Animator Film Festival in Poland, the Athens International Film Festival in Greece, the San Sebastian International Film Festival in Spain, and the London International Animation Festival, winning a number of awards.

The film opened in New York City on 3 September 2014, and was released in 35 U.S. cities, distributed by Zeitgeist Films. It also was released in Latvia by Locomotive Productions. "Rocks In My Pockets" is now available for streaming and downloads on a number of platforms, and is also available on DVD.

The film attained exceptionally high ratings among U.S. reviewers: a 100% score based on 22 reviews at Rotten Tomatoes, as of July 2019. In December 2019, animation web-site Zippy Frames ranked Rocks in My Pockets ninth on their list of the 20 Best Animation Features of the 2010s, stating, "Coming before the #metoo movement was ever adopted, it is a surrealistic and poignant tale of empowerment that it is an essential element of this decade."

=== My Love Affair with Marriage ===
Signe directed and animated her second animated feature film, My Love Affair with Marriage, which infuses music and science into a personal love story. The film examines the biological chemistry of love and gender, as well as societal pressures on an individual to conform to the social mores of the times.

After receiving a development grant from NYSCA, through Women Make Movies, the project then raised over $132,000 through Kickstarter to fund production. She animated the movie in a partnership with Locomotive Productions, based in Latvia.

The voice cast includes Dagmara Dominczyk, Matthew Modine, Cameron Monaghan, Stephen Lang, Erica Schroeder, Emma Kenney, and Michele Pawk in key roles.

== Style and themes ==
Baumane mainly utilizes a personal narration over a flat 2D hand-drawn cel-shaded style of animation. In her feature films, Rocks in My Pockets and My Love Affair with Marriage, she combines papier-mâché and stop-motion with traditional animation.

Her work tackles difficult subjects such as sex, pregnancy and depression and makes it palatable through irony and humor. Her narrative style uses visual metaphors to communicate how living people feel inside; one example is in her animated short Birth her use of the body as a vessel in her film. Baumane's Teat Beat of Sex, a series of semi fictionalized personal recollections that stem from the artist's firsthand experience and an array of viewpoints on the subject, are uncompromisingly yet refreshingly candid, oftentimes dealing with somewhat taboo areas that can serve as discussion points.

== Filmography ==
=== Animated Shorts ===
- The Witch and the Cow (1991)
- Tiny Shoes (1993)
- The Gold of the Tigers (1995)
- Love Story (1998)
- The Threatened One (1999)
- Natasha (2001)
- Five Fucking Fables (2002)
- Woman (2002)
- Dentist (2005)
- Five Infomercials for Dentists (2005)
- Teat Beat of Sex (2007)
- Veterinarian (2007)
- The Very First Desire Now and Forever (2007)
- Teat Beat of Sex: Episodes 8, 9, 19, 11 (2007)
- Birth (2009)

=== Animated Features ===
- Rocks in My Pockets (2014)
- My Love Affair with Marriage (2022)

=== Compilations (DVD) ===
- Avoid Eye Contact Vol. 1
- Avoid Eye Contact Vol. 2
- Ten Animated Films by Signe Baumane
- Teat Beat of Sex

=== Music Videos ===
- Cousin Joe Twoshacks - "Tarzan" (2014)
