= Sachiko Kojima =

Japanese actress & voice actress (born 1979)

- 小島 幸子
- Born: January 18, 1979 (age 47); Chiba Prefecture, Japan
- Occupations: Actress; voice actress
- Years active: 1987–present
- Agent: Mausu Promotion
- Height: 170 cm (5 ft 7 in)
- Spouse: Makoto Yasue
- Children: 2

Sachiko Kojima (小島 幸子, Kojima Sachiko; born January 18, 1979 in Chiba Prefecture) is a Japanese actress and voice actress who is affiliated with Mausu Promotion. She is married to Makoto Yasue, a sound director employed by Glovision. On Twitter under the name chiffons, she reported the birth of her first son on August 3, 2011, in a tweet on August 11, 2011, and the birth of her second son on May 15, 2013, in a tweet on May 17, 2013.

== Filmography ==
=== Mixed media ===
- Galaxy Angel series (????) (Creta)
- Sakura Wars series (????) (Mell Raison)

=== Television animation ===
1999

- Cowboy Bebop (Angel)

2001

- Baki the Grappler (Kozue Matsumoto)

2002

- Saikano (Yukari)
- Tokyo Underground (Hekisa)

2004

- Tweeny Witches (Arusu)
- Sonic X (Molly)
- The Galaxy Railways (Tina)

2006

- Ergo Proxy (Monad Proxy)
- Fushigiboshi no FutagoHime Gyu! (Rein's Mother)
- Inukami! (Snake Woman)
- Kage Kara Mamoru! (Tsubaki Mapputatsu)
- Lemon Angel Project (Keiko Shikina)
- Ray the Animation (Burūsokkusu)

2007

- Bamboo Blade (Sayako Kuwahara)
- Dennō Coil (Fumie)
- Kekkaishi (Aihi)
- Emily of New Moon (Ilse Burnley)

2008

- Rosario + Vampire (Kyōko Aono)

2009

- Aoi Hana (Hanae)
- Stitch! The Mischievous Alien's Great Adventure (Sand)
- Viper's Creed (Maika)

2012

- AKB0048 (Mikako Minamino)
- High School DxD (Issei's mother)
- Psycho-Pass (Chika Shimazu)

2013

- JoJo's Bizarre Adventure: Battle Tendency (Suzi Q)

2014

- Marvel Disk Wars: The Avengers (Rosetta Riley)
- HappinessCharge PreCure! (Miyo Masuko)
- JoJo's Bizarre Adventure: Stardust Crusaders (Suzi Q)

2015

- Maria the Virgin Witch (Lolotte)

2016

- Active Raid (Governor's Secretary)
- Cardfight!! Vanguard G Stride Gate (Hiroki Moriyama)
- Rin-ne (Shizuka Arakawara; young)

2019

- Fruits Basket (Okami Soma)
- Star Twinkle PreCure (Terumi Hoshina)

2020

- Boruto: Naruto Next Generations (Sakuya)
- Yashahime: Princess Half-Demon (Joka)

2024

- Girls Band Cry (Yasue Iseri)
- TsumaSho (Chika Shiraishi)

Unknown date

- Monkey Typhoon (Karin Kuramu)
- Naruto (Female Orochimaru)

=== Theatrical animation ===
- Naruto the Movie 2: Great Clash! The Illusionary Ruins at the Depths of the Earth (2005) (Kamira)

=== Original video animation ===
- Mobile Suit Gundam: The Witch from Mercury Prologue (2022) (Nyla Bertran)

=== Video games ===
- Panzer Dragoon Saga (1998) (Fei)
- Wild Arms 4 (2005) (Belial)
- Drakengard 2 (2005) (Hanch)
- Everybody's Tennis (2006) (Jun)
- Soulcalibur Legends (2007) (Taki)
- Soulcalibur IV (2008) (Taki)
- Soulcalibur: Broken Destiny (2009) (Taki)
- Way of the Samurai 4 (2011) (Akemi, Madara)
- Everybody's Golf 6 (2011) (Satsuki)
- Granblue Fantasy (2014) (Scathacha)
- Valkyria Chronicles IV (2018) (Hanna Ivanovic)
- Apex Legends (2019) (Wraith - Japanese voice)
- Fire Emblem: Three Houses (2019) (Manuela)

Unknown date

- Ys I & II (????) (Maria)

=== Dubbing ===
==== Live-action ====
- Amanda Seyfried
  - Mamma Mia! (Sophie Sheridan)
  - Jennifer's Body (Anita "Needy" Lesnicki)
  - Letters to Juliet (Sophie Hall)
  - Lovelace (Linda Lovelace)
  - A Million Ways to Die in the West (Louise)
  - Love the Coopers (Ruby)
  - The Last Word (Anne Sherman)
  - Mamma Mia! Here We Go Again (Sophie Sheridan)
  - The Art of Racing in the Rain (Avery "Eve" Swift)
  - Mank (Marion Davies)
  - Things Heard & Seen (Catherine Claire)
- Anna Paquin
  - A Walk on the Moon (Allison Kantrowitz)
  - Almost Famous (Polexia Aphrodisia)
  - Finding Forrester (Claire)
  - X-Men (Rogue)
  - 25th Hour (Mary D'Annunzio)
  - X2 (Rogue)
  - American Underdog (Brenda Mooni)
- Aubrey Plaza
  - The To Do List (Brandy Klark)
  - Life After Beth (Beth Slocum)
  - Child's Play (Karen Barclay)
  - Best Sellers (Lucy Stanbridge)
- 10 Things I Hate About You (Kat Stratford (Julia Stiles))
- 17 Again (Maggie (Michelle Trachtenberg))
- Ace Ventura: Pet Detective (2025 BS10 Star Channel edition) (Lt. Lois Einhorn (Sean Young))
- American Beauty (Angela (Mena Suvari))
- The Animal (Rianna (Colleen Haskell))
- Batman Begins (Rachel Dawes (Katie Holmes))
- Beethoven (Ryce Newton (Nicholle Tom))
- Big Little Lies (Madeline Martha Mackenzie (Reese Witherspoon))
- Blade Runner: The Final Cut (Pris (Daryl Hannah))
- Bram Stoker's Dracula (15th Anniversary edition) (Lucy Westenra (Sadie Frost))
- The Breakfast Club (Claire Standish (Molly Ringwald))
- Casper (Kathleen Harvey (Christina Ricci))
- Cats & Dogs: The Revenge of Kitty Galore (Catherine (Christina Applegate))
- Clerks (Veronica Loughran (Marilyn Ghigliotti))
- A Dog's Purpose (Maya (Kirby Howell-Baptiste))
- Dr. Dolittle 3 (Maya Dolittle (Kyla Pratt))
- Dr. Dolittle: Tail to the Chief (Maya Dolittle (Kyla Pratt))
- Dr. Dolittle: Million Dollar Mutts (Maya Dolittle (Kyla Pratt))
- Drag Me to Hell (Christine Brown (Alison Lohman))
- Election (Tammy Metzler (Jessica Campbell))
- Eragon (Angela (Joss Stone))
- Everwood (Amy Abbott (Emily VanCamp))
- Fat Albert (Doris Robertson (Kyla Pratt))
- Fireproof (Catherine Holt (Erin Bethea))
- Genius (Marie-Thérèse Walter (Poppy Delevingne))
- Girl, Interrupted (Daisy Randone (Brittany Murphy))
- The Girl Next Door (Meg Loughlin (Blythe Auffarth))
- A Good Year (Fanny Chenal (Marion Cotillard))
- Goosebumps (Attack of the Jack O' Lanterns) (Drew (Erica Luttrell))
  - (The Blob That Ate Everyone) (Alex)
  - (Chillogy Pt. 1 Squeal of Fortune) (Nicky)
- Grey's Anatomy (Hannah Davies (Christina Ricci))
- Hit and Run (Mary Murdock (Laura Breckenridge))
- Hotel for Dogs (Andi (Emma Roberts))
- The House Bunny (Shelley Darlingson (Anna Faris))
- Hustlers (Destiny (Constance Wu))
- I Am Mother (Mother (Rose Byrne))
- I Origins (Priya Varma (Archie Panjabi))
- Infinitely Polar Bear (Amelia Stuart (Imogene Wolodarsky))
- Joe Dirt 2: Beautiful Loser (Brandy (Brittany Daniel))
- Jurassic World (2025 The Cinema edition) (Karen Mitchell (Judy Greer))
- A Knight's Tale (Jocelyn (Shannyn Sossamon))
- Life with Derek (Casey McDonald (Ashley Leggat))
- Lost in Translation (Kelly (Anna Faris))
- Mars Attacks! (Taffy Dale (Natalie Portman))
- The Messengers (Jessica Solomon (Kristen Stewart))
- Mighty Joe Young (Jill Young (Charlize Theron))
- Never Been Kissed (Aldys (Leelee Sobieski))
- No Strings Attached (Dr. Patrice (Greta Gerwig))
- Not One Less (Teacher Wei (Wei Minzhi))
- One Chance (Julie-Ann "Julz" Potts (Alexandra Roach))
- One of Them Days (Dreux (Keke Palmer))
- The Originals (Rebekah Mikaelson (Claire Holt))
- Pieces of April (April Burns (Katie Holmes))
- Power Rangers: Samurai (Mia Watanbe/Pink Samurai Ranger (Erika Fong))
- The Sapphires (Cynthia (Miranda Tapsell))
- SEAL Team (Alana Hayes (Michaela McManus))
- The Sisterhood of the Traveling Pants (Tibby Rollins (Amber Tamblyn))
- The Sisterhood of the Traveling Pants 2 (Tibby Rollins (Amber Tamblyn))
- Sisters (Maura Ellis (Amy Poehler))
- Sleepy Hollow (Katrina Van Tassel (Christina Ricci))
- Slither (Kylie Strutemyer (Tania Saulnier))
- Step Up Revolution (DJ Penelope (Cleopatra Coleman))
- Take the Lead (LaRhette Dudley (Yaya DaCosta))
- Ted (Tami-Lynn (Jessica Barth))
- Ted 2 (Tami-Lynn (Jessica Barth))
- The Twilight Zone (Eve Martin (Ginnifer Goodwin))
- Unbreakable Kimmy Schmidt (Kimmy Schmidt (Ellie Kemper))
- The Vow (Paige Collins (Rachel McAdams))
- Wednesday (Marilyn Thornhill / Laurel Gates (Christina Ricci))
- The Yellow Handkerchief (Martine (Kristen Stewart))

==== Animation ====
- Chicken Little (Abby Mallard)
- Chuggington (Emery)
- Curious George (Cayley)
- Helluva Boss (Millie)
- Hi Hi Puffy AmiYumi (Yumi)
- ¡Mucha Lucha! (Buena Girl)
- Sabrina: The Animated Series (Sabrina Spellman)
- Spider-Man: Into the Spider-Verse (Rio Morales)
- Star Trek: Lower Decks (Beckett Mariner)
- Steven Universe (Pearl)
- Wander Over Yonder (Lord Dominator)
