= The Girl Next Door (Ketchum novel) =

1989 horror novel by Jack Ketchum

- Author: Jack Ketchum
- Illustrator: Neal McPheeters
- Language: English
- Genre: Crime, Thriller, Horror
- Publisher: Warner Books, Overlook Connection Press, Leisure Books, Amazon Kindle
- Publication date: 1989
- Publication place: United States
- Media type: Paperback, Hardcover & E-book
- Pages: 370
- ISBN: 0-446-34909-7
- Preceded by: She Wakes 1989 in literature
- Followed by: Offspring 1991 in literature

The Girl Next Door is a 1989 horror novel by American writer Jack Ketchum. It is loosely based on the 1965 murder of Sylvia Likens. In 2007, it was adapted into the film The Girl Next Door.

== Premise ==
Two teenage girls are left in the care of their aunt, and they suffer systematic and escalating abuse at the hands of their aunt and her children.

== Synopsis ==
The story takes place in 1950s suburban United States, and is told in flashback form by the narrator, David.

Ruth, a single mother and an alcoholic (amongst other things) has three sons: Willie, Donny, and Ralph. Ruth has gained the trust of the neighborhood children by allowing them to come freely into her home, play as rough as they wish, and even drink an occasional beer with her. Her nieces are Meg, a teen girl for whom David develops feelings, and Susan, a young girl who was severely injured in a car accident and still experiences complications from it. Both come to live with their aunt after the sudden death of their parents. At first, all seems well. However, Ruth's mental state has been deteriorating over time, and the burden of having two more children to care for seems to accelerate her descent into madness.

Ruth begins verbally abusing Meg. After an incident where Meg hits Ralph when he touches her breast, Ruth beats Susan for "being in connivance" with Meg. When Meg tries to tell a police officer about the abuse, Ruth locks her in their bomb shelter for attempting to leave her property, allows her boys to strip her, then leaves her bound and gagged all night. She starves her and allows the other children to burn her, beat her, and even urinate in Meg's face over the course of months, making them feel that because they have the permission of an adult, their actions are okay.

David realizes that he must do something before he loses the first girl he has ever loved. Despite his efforts, his plan to rescue Meg is foiled when Meg tries to bring Susan with her and Ruth catches them. As punishment, Ruth allows her son Donny to rape Meg. Willie also wants to rape her, but Ruth refuses to let him, saying it is incest for him to do so after his brother. Eventually, under the suggestion of Ralph, Ruth carves the words "I FUCK / FUCK ME" into Meg's stomach. She then decides she will end all sexual desire on Meg's part and gives her a clitorectomy.

Meg dies, and the police arrive to arrest the Chandlers. David sees Ruth wearing Meg's mother's wedding band. Remembering a promise to get it back to Meg, he vengefully pushes Ruth down the stairs, killing her. The officer realizes David did this intentionally, but, knowing how evil Ruth was, the officer claims the fall as nothing more than an act of justifiable homicide to avenge Meg, and David, giving the band to Susan, is pardoned.

As an adult visiting his mother’s home, David learns of a brutal crime spree perpetrated by one of the now-grown children of Ruth, David is left to wonder what has become of the other children involved.

== Film adaptation ==
A feature film based on Ketchum's novel was released in 2007. Entitled The Girl Next Door, the film stars Blanche Baker, Blythe Auffarth, William Atherton, and Daniel Manche. It was directed by Gregory Wilson from a screenplay by Daniel Farrands and Philip Nutman. After a successful series of screenings at film festivals around the world, the film was released by Starz Home Entertainment on December 4, 2007.
