= Lolita (play) =

1981 play by Edward Albee

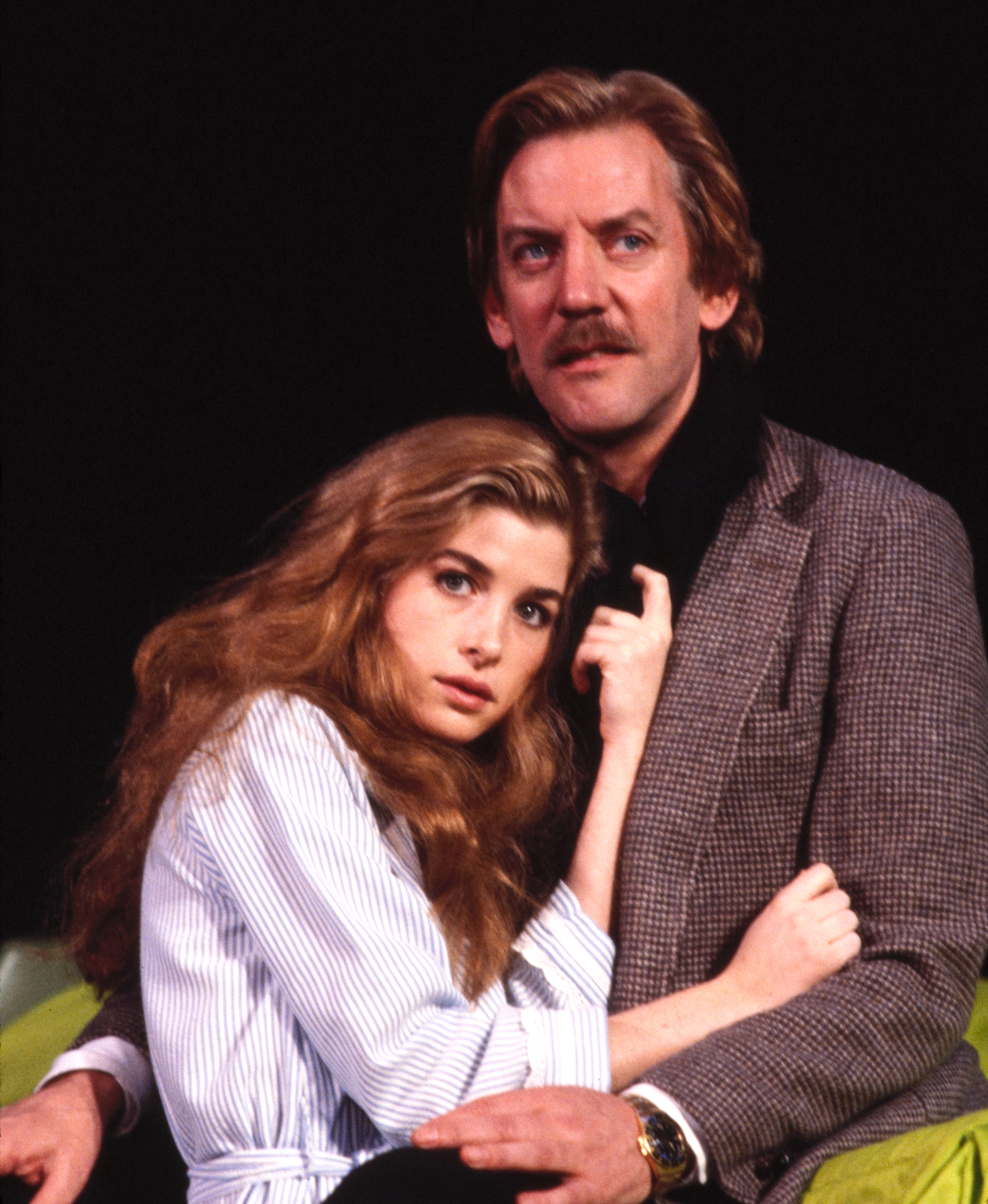
Blanche Baker and Donald Sutherland in Lolita rehearsal

Lolita is a play adapted by Edward Albee from Vladimir Nabokov's 1955 novel of the same name. The troubled production opened at the Brooks Atkinson Theatre on Broadway on March 19, 1981, after 31 previews and closed after only 12 performances.

Albee later insisted, "My adaptation of Nabokov's Lolita, of course, was never done on Broadway. Something called Lolita with my name attached to it was produced on Broadway, but it was not my adaptation of Nabokov's Lolita. The one really truly ugly theater experience I have had in a long and reasonably happy career was the experience of losing control of the production of that play." The full text of Albee's adaptation of Lolita, with copyright dates of 1979, 1980, and 1984, was published in the third volume of his collected plays. In his introduction he noted, "no one who saw the execrable production the play received on Broadway could penetrate through it to the homage I was paying Nabokov."

Frank Rich in his New York Times review wondered why the play even opened after "weeks of delays" as it was "the kind of embarrassment that audiences do not quickly forget or forgive." Rich said the least of its sins were incompetence, being boring, and trashing a literary masterpiece. "What sets Lolita apart from ordinary failures is its abject mean-spiritedness," he wrote. "For all this play's babbling about love, it is rank with indiscriminate – and decidedly unearned – hate."

Ten years earlier, John Barry and Alan Jay Lerner's musical Lolita, My Love had bombed, closing during tryouts in Boston. (Albee's Lolita also played in Boston before its Broadway launch.) Critics had scorned the play, saying that the lack of Nabokov's authorial voice made the musical salacious. Albee put Nabokov on stage in his play, but it did not help.

The cast included Donald Sutherland as Humbert Humbert, Clive Revill as Claire Quilty, Ian Richardson as Nabokov, Shirley Stoler as Charlotte Haze and Blanche Baker as Dolores Haze a.k.a. Lolita. Baker was mentioned by Rich in only one line. "In the title role, here a minor figure, the 24-year-old Miss Baker does a clever job of impersonating the downy nymphet; she deserves a more substantial stage vehicle soon."
