= Murder of Sylvia Likens =

1965 child murder in Indianapolis, U.S.

Sylvia Likens
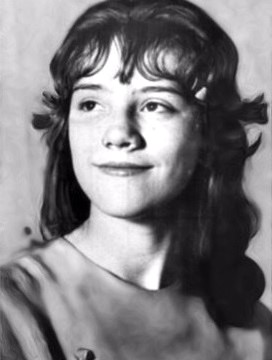
- Sylvia Likens, c. 1965
- Born: Sylvia Marie Likens; January 3, 1949; Lebanon, Indiana, U.S.
- Died: October 26, 1965 (aged 16); Indianapolis, Indiana, U.S.
- Cause of death: Subdural hematoma; Shock; Malnutrition
- Resting place: Oak Hill Cemetery; Lebanon, Indiana, U.S. 40.046134°N 86.454622°W
- Known for: Victim of torture murder

Sylvia Marie Likens (January 3, 1949 – October 26, 1965) was an American teenager who was tortured and murdered by her caregiver, Gertrude Baniszewski, many of Baniszewski's children, and several of their neighborhood friends. The abuse lasted for three months, occurring incrementally, before Likens died from her extensive injuries and malnourishment on October 26, 1965, in Indianapolis, Indiana.

Likens was increasingly tormented, neglected, belittled, sexually humiliated, beaten, starved, lacerated, burned, and dehydrated by her tormentors. Her autopsy showed 150 wounds across her body, including several burns, scald marks and eroded skin. Through intimidation, her younger sister, Jenny, was occasionally forced to participate in her mistreatment. The official cause of her death was determined to be a homicide caused by a combination of subdural hematoma and shock, complicated by severe malnutrition.

Gertrude Baniszewski, her eldest daughter, Paula, her son, John, and two neighborhood youths, Coy Hubbard and Richard Hobbs, were all tried and convicted in May 1966 of neglecting, torturing, and murdering Likens. At the defendants' trial, Deputy Prosecutor Leroy New described the case as "the most diabolical case to ever come before a court or jury" and Gertrude's defense attorney, William Erbecker, described Likens as having been subjected to acts of "degradation that you wouldn't commit on a dog" before her death.

After eight hours of deliberation, the jury found Gertrude Baniszewski guilty of first-degree murder. She was sentenced to life imprisonment but was released on parole in 1985. Paula was found guilty of second-degree murder and was released in 1972; Hobbs, Hubbard, and John were found guilty of manslaughter and served less than two years in the Indiana Reformatory before being granted parole on February 27, 1968.

The torture and murder of Sylvia Likens is widely regarded as one of the worst crimes in Indiana history and has been described by a senior investigator in the Indianapolis Police Department as the "most sadistic" case he had ever investigated in the thirty-five years he served with the Indianapolis Police.

== Background ==
=== Gertrude Baniszewski ===
Gertrude Nadine Baniszewski (née Van Fossan; September 19, 1928 – June 16, 1990) was born in Indianapolis, Indiana, to Hugh Marcus Van Fossan Sr. and Molly Myrtle (née Oakley), both of whom were originally from Illinois and were of English and Dutch descent. Baniszewski was the third of six children, and her family was working class. On October 5, 1939, Baniszewski saw her 50-year-old father die from a sudden heart attack. Six years later, she dropped out of high school at age 16 to marry 18-year-old John Stephan Baniszewski (1926–2007), who was originally from Youngsville, Pennsylvania, and was of Polish ancestry, and with whom she had four children. Although John Baniszewski had a volatile temper and occasionally beat his wife, the two remained together for ten years prior to their first divorce. Following her divorce, Baniszewski married a man named Edward Guthrie. This marriage lasted just three months before the couple divorced. Shortly thereafter, Baniszewski remarried her first husband, with whom she had two more children. The couple divorced for the second time in 1963.

Weeks after her third divorce, Baniszewski began a relationship with a 20-year-old welder named Dennis Lee Wright, who also physically abused her. She had one child with Wright, Dennis Lee Wright Jr. Shortly after the birth of their son in May 1964, Wright abandoned Baniszewski. Shortly thereafter, Baniszewski filed a paternity suit against Wright for financial support of their child, but Wright seldom contributed to the care of their son.

By 1965, Baniszewski lived alone with her seven children: Paula (17), Stephanie (15), John (12), Marie (11), Shirley (10), James (8), and Dennis Lee Wright Jr. (1). Although she was 36 years old and 5 feet 6 inches (168 cm) in height, she weighed only 100 pounds (45 kg) and has been described as a "haggard, underweight asthmatic" chain smoker suffering from clinical depression due to the stress of three failed marriages, a failed relationship, and a recent miscarriage. In addition to the sporadic checks she received from her first husband — a former Indianapolis policeman — upon whom she primarily relied financially to support her children, Baniszewski occasionally performed odd jobs for neighbors and acquaintances, such as sewing or cleaning in order to earn money. Baniszewski resided in Indianapolis at 3850 East New York Street, where the monthly rent was $55.

=== Sylvia Likens ===
Sylvia Marie Likens (January 3, 1949 – October 26, 1965) was the third of five children born to carnival workers Lester Cecil Likens (1926–2013) and Elizabeth "Betty" Frances (née Grimes; 1927–1998). She was born between two sets of fraternal twins — Daniel and Dianna (two years older than her) and Benny Ray and Jenny Fay (one year younger). Jenny Likens suffered from polio, causing one of her legs to be weaker than the other. She was afflicted with a notable limp and had to wear a steel brace on one leg.

Lester and Elizabeth's marriage was unstable; they often sold candy, beer, and soda at carnival stands around Indiana throughout the summer, moving frequently, and regularly experiencing severe financial difficulties. The Likens's sons regularly traveled with them in order to assist with their job, but Sylvia and Jenny were discouraged from doing the same, out of concern for their safety and education. (Note: Lester and Elizabeth Likens's oldest daughter, Dianna Shoemaker, was estranged from her family. As such, she was forbidden by her parents to initiate contact with her younger sisters.) As a result, both sisters frequently stayed with their relatives, often their grandmother. (Note: Sylvia and her siblings would live at nineteen separate addresses between 1949 and 1965.)

In her teenage years, Sylvia Likens occasionally earned spending money by babysitting, running errands, or performing ironing chores for friends and neighbors, often giving her mother part of her earnings. She has been described as a friendly, confident, and lively girl, with long, wavy, light brown hair extending below her shoulders, and was known as "Cookie" to her friends.

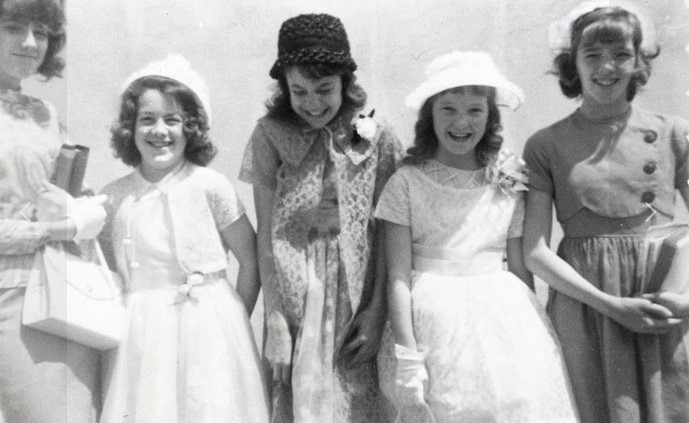
Sylvia (left) and Jenny (right), pictured with three friends in Long Beach, California, on Easter Sunday, 1965.

Although exuberant, Likens always kept her mouth closed when smiling due to a missing front tooth, which she had lost while roughhousing with one of her brothers during a childhood game. She was also fond of music, particularly the Beatles, and was notably protective of her markedly more timid and insecure younger sister. On several occasions, the two sisters would visit a local skating rink, where Sylvia would help Jenny skate by holding her hand, while Jenny skated on her unaffected foot.

== July 1965 ==
By June 1965, Sylvia and Jenny Likens resided with their parents in Indianapolis. On July 3, their mother was arrested and subsequently jailed for shoplifting. Shortly thereafter, Lester Likens arranged for his daughters to board with Gertrude Baniszewski, the mother of two girls with whom the sisters had recently become acquainted while studying at Arsenal Technical High School, Paula and Stephanie Baniszewski. At the time of this boarding agreement, Gertrude assured Lester she would care for his daughters until his return as if they were her own children. (Note: Although Lester Likens later testified he had known the Baniszewskis were a poor family, he had not checked into the condition of their household before allowing Gertrude to care for his daughters.)

Shortly after the Fourth of July holiday, the sisters moved into 3850 East New York Street in order for their father and, later, their mother to travel to the East Coast with the carnival, (Note: Following her release from jail, Elizabeth Likens would immediately join her husband in their seasonal employment with the traveling carnival.) with the understanding that Gertrude would receive weekly boarding fees of $20 to care for their daughters until they returned to collect Sylvia and Jenny in November of that year.

During the initial weeks in which Sylvia and Jenny resided at the Baniszewski household, the sisters were subjected to very little discipline or abuse. Likens regularly sang along to pop records with Stephanie, and she willingly participated in housework at the Baniszewski residence. Both girls also regularly attended Sunday school with the Baniszewski children, with the pastor commending Sylvia's piety.

== Abuse ==
Although Lester Likens had agreed to pay Gertrude Baniszewski $20 a week in exchange for the care of his daughters, after approximately two weeks, these payments failed to consistently arrive upon the prearranged dates, occasionally arriving one or two days late. In response, Gertrude began venting her frustration at this fact upon the sisters by beating their bare buttocks with various implements, such as a one-quarter-inch-thick (6.4 mm) paddle, making statements such as, "Well, I took care of you two little bitches for a week for nothing!" On one occasion, in late August, both girls were beaten approximately fifteen times on the back with the aforementioned paddle, after Paula had accused the sisters of eating too much food at a church supper the household children had attended.

By mid-August, Gertrude Baniszewski had begun to focus her abuse almost exclusively upon Sylvia, with her primary motivation likely being jealousy of the girl's youth, appearance, respectability, and potential. According to subsequent trial testimony, this abuse was initially inflicted upon Sylvia, after she and Jenny had returned to the Baniszewski residence from Arsenal Technical High School, as well as on weekends. This initial abuse included subjecting Likens to beatings and starvation, forcing her to eat leftovers or spoiled food out of garbage cans. On one occasion, Likens was accused of stealing candy she had actually purchased.

On another occasion, in late August, Likens was subjected to humiliation when she claimed to have a boyfriend in Long Beach, whom she had met in the spring of 1965 when her family lived in California. In response, Gertrude asked if Sylvia had "ever done anything with a boy" to which Likens—unsure of her meaning—replied, "I guess so," and explained that she had gone skating with boys there, and had once gone to a park on the beach with them. Continuing the conversation with Jenny and Stephanie, Sylvia mentioned that she had once lain under the covers with her boyfriend. Upon hearing this, Gertrude asked, "Why did you do that, Sylvia?" Likens replied, "I don't know," and shrugged. Several days later, Gertrude returned to the subject with Likens, telling her, "You're certainly getting big in the stomach, Sylvia. It looks like you're going to have a baby." Likens thought Gertrude was kidding with her and said, "Yeah, it sure is getting big. I'm just going to have to go on a diet."

Gertrude then told her, and the other girls in the house, that whenever they "did something" with a boy, they would be sure to have a baby. She then kicked Likens in the genitals. Paula—herself three months pregnant, and also jealous of Likens's physical appearance—then participated in attacking Likens, knocking her off her chair and onto the kitchen floor, shouting, "You ain't fit to sit in a chair!"

On another occasion, as the family ate supper, Gertrude, Paula, and a neighborhood boy named Randy Gordon Lepper force-fed Likens a hot dog overloaded with condiments, including mustard and spices. Likens vomited as a result, and was later forced to consume what she had regurgitated.

In what was Likens's only act of retaliation, she is alleged to have spread a rumor at Arsenal Technical High School that Stephanie and Paula Baniszewski were prostitutes because she was upset with the household singling her out for similar accusations. (Note: According to Jenny Likens's later trial testimony, Sylvia did not spread any rumors of this nature. Jenny insisted the rumors were false accusations spread against Sylvia.)

While at school, Stephanie was jokingly propositioned by a boy who told her that Likens had started this rumor about her. Upon returning home that day, Stephanie questioned Likens about the rumor and she admitted to starting it. Stephanie punched her in response, but Likens apologized to her, in tears, and Stephanie then also began to cry. However, when Stephanie's boyfriend, 15-year-old Coy Randolph Hubbard, heard of the rumor, he brutally attacked Likens, slapping her, banging her head against the wall and flipping her backwards onto the floor. When Gertrude found out, she used a paddle to beat Likens.

On another occasion, Paula beat Likens about the face with such force that she broke her own wrist, having primarily focused her blows upon Likens's teeth and eyes. Later, Paula used the cast on her wrist to further beat Likens. Gertrude repeatedly falsely accused Likens of promiscuity and of engaging in prostitution, ranting about the filthiness of prostitution and women in general. Gertrude would later occasionally force Jenny to strike her own sister, beating Jenny if she did not comply.

Coy Hubbard and several of his classmates frequently visited the Baniszewski residence to both physically and verbally torment Likens, often collaborating with Baniszewski's children and Gertrude herself. With Gertrude's active encouragement, these neighborhood children routinely beat Likens, sometimes using her as a practice dummy in violent judo sessions, lacerating her body, burning her skin with lit cigarettes in excess of 100 times, and severely injuring her genitals. To entertain Gertrude and her teenage accomplices, Likens was forced at one point to strip naked in the family living room and penetrate herself with a glass Pepsi bottle in their presence, with Gertrude stating to all present that this act of humiliation was for Sylvia to "prove to Jenny what kind of a girl you are."

Gertrude eventually forbade Likens from attending school after she confessed to having stolen a gym suit from the school due to Gertrude having refused to purchase the clothing for her. For this act of theft, Gertrude whipped Likens with a three-inch-wide (7.6 cm) police belt. Gertrude then switched her conversation to the "evils" of premarital sex before repeatedly kicking Likens in the genitals as Stephanie rallied to Likens's defense, shouting, "She didn't do anything!" (Note: Although Stephanie had initially believed the rumors initiated by Paula that Likens had spread distasteful rumors relating to herself and her older sister, as the abuse of Likens escalated, she would regularly rally to Likens's defense—occasionally removing objects from her mother or Paula's hands with which they had been striking the girl.) Gertrude then burned Likens's fingertips with matches before further whipping her. A few days later, Gertrude repeatedly whipped Jenny with the police belt after she reportedly stole a single tennis shoe from the school to wear on her strong foot.

=== Turmoil ===
The Likens siblings were afraid of notifying either family members or adults at their school of the steepening domestic tumult, as both were afraid that doing so would only worsen their situation. Jenny, in particular, struggled against the urge to notify family members, as she had been threatened by Gertrude that she would herself be abused and tortured to the same degree as her sister if she did so. Jenny was also subjected to bullying by girls in her neighborhood, in addition to occasionally being ridiculed or beaten whenever she alluded to Sylvia's situation.

In July and August, both Lester and Elizabeth Likens would occasionally return to Indianapolis to visit their daughters, whenever their travel schedule afforded them the opportunity. The last occasion Lester and Elizabeth visited their daughters was on October 5. On this occasion, neither girl exhibited any visible sign of distress about their mistreatment to their parents. This was likely because both were in the presence of Gertrude and her children. Almost immediately after Lester and Elizabeth had left the Baniszewski household on their final visit, Gertrude turned to face Likens and stated: "What are you going to do now, Sylvia? Now they're gone?"

On one occasion in September, the girls encountered their older sister, Dianna Shoemaker, at a local park. Both Jenny and Sylvia informed Dianna about the abuse they were enduring at the hands of their caregiver, adding that Sylvia was being specifically targeted for physical abuse and almost always for things she had neither said nor done. Neither sister mentioned the actual address where they resided and, initially, Dianna believed her sisters must have been exaggerating their claims regarding the scope of their mistreatment. (Note: One of the reasons Dianna initially believed Sylvia and Jenny had been exaggerating the scale of abuse Sylvia in particular endured at the Baniszewski household was that their father had occasionally struck his five children with a belt as a form of discipline for misbehavior.)

Several weeks prior to this, Sylvia and Jenny had encountered Dianna in the same park, while in the company of 11-year-old Marie Baniszewski, and Sylvia had been given a sandwich to eat when she mentioned to her sister that she was hungry. Likens remained silent about the matter, although Marie revealed this fact to her family in late September. In response, Gertrude accused Likens of engaging in gluttony before she and Paula choked and bludgeoned her. The pair then subjected Likens to a scalding bath in order to "cleanse her of sin," with Gertrude grabbing Likens's hair and repeatedly banging her head against the bath to revive her whenever she fainted.

Shortly after this incident, the father of a neighborhood boy named Michael John Monroe phoned Arsenal Technical High School to anonymously report that a girl with open sores across her entire body was living at the Baniszewski household. As Likens had not attended school for several days, a school nurse visited East New York Street to investigate these claims. Gertrude claimed to the nurse that Likens had run away from her home the previous week and that she was unaware of her actual whereabouts, adding that Likens was "out of control" and that her open sores were a result of Likens's refusal to maintain decent personal hygiene. Gertrude further claimed that Likens was a bad influence on both her own children and her sister. The school made no further investigations concerning Likens's welfare.

The immediate neighbors of the Baniszewski family were a middle-aged couple named Raymond and Phyllis Vermillion. Both initially viewed Gertrude as an ideal caregiver for the Likens sisters and both had visited the Baniszewski residence on two occasions while the girls had been under Gertrude's care. On both occasions, however, the Vermillions witnessed Paula physically abusing Likens—who on both occasions had a black eye—and openly boasting about her mistreatment of the child to them. Upon their second visit to the Baniszewski household, both observed Likens to appear extremely meek and somewhat "zombified" in nature. Nevertheless, the Vermillions never reported Likens's evident mistreatment to the authorities.

On or about October 1, Dianna Shoemaker discovered that her sisters were at the Baniszewski residence. She visited the property in an attempt to initiate regular contact. Gertrude, however, refused to allow Dianna entry to the property, stating that she had "[received] permission" from their parents not to allow either of the girls to see her. She then ordered Dianna to leave the property. Approximately two weeks later, Dianna encountered Jenny, by chance, close to the home and inquired as to Sylvia's welfare. She was informed, "I can't tell you or I'll get into trouble."

=== Escalation ===
Due to the increase in the frequency and brutality of the torture and mistreatment Likens was subjected to, she gradually became incontinent. She was denied any access to the bathroom, being forced to wet herself. As a form of punishment for her incontinence, on October 6, Gertrude threw Likens into the basement and tied her up. Here, Likens was often kept naked, rarely fed, and frequently deprived of water. Occasionally, she was tied to the railing of the basement stairs with her feet barely touching the ground.

In the weeks prior to locking Likens in the family basement, Gertrude had increasingly abused and tormented Likens. She would occasionally falsely claim to the children in her household that either she, herself, or one of them had been receiving direct insults from Likens in the hope this would provoke them into belittling or attacking her. On one occasion, Gertrude held a knife aloft and challenged Likens to "fight me back", to which Likens replied she did not know how to fight. In response, Gertrude inflicted a light scour wound to Likens's leg.

Physical and mental torment such as this would occasionally pause when the Baniszewskis watched their favorite television shows. Neighborhood children were also occasionally charged five cents apiece to see the "display" of Likens's body and to humiliate, beat, scald, burn, and—ultimately—mutilate her. Throughout Likens's captivity in the basement, Gertrude frequently, with the assistance of her children and neighborhood children, restrained and gagged Likens before placing her in a bathtub filled with scalding water and proceeding to rub salt into her wounds.

On one occasion, Gertrude and her twelve-year-old son, John Jr., rubbed urine and feces from Gertrude's one-year-old son's diaper into Likens's mouth before giving her a cup half-filled with water and stating the water was all she would receive for the remainder of the day.

On October 22, John Baniszewski Jr. tormented Likens by offering to allow her to eat a bowl of soup with her fingers and then quickly taking away the bowl when Likens—by this stage suffering from extreme malnourishment—attempted to eat the food. Gertrude Baniszewski eventually allowed Likens to sleep upstairs, on the condition that she learned not to wet herself. That night, Sylvia whispered to Jenny to secretly give her a glass of water before falling asleep.

The following morning, Gertrude discovered that Likens had urinated on herself. As a punishment, Likens was forced to insert an empty glass Coca-Cola bottle into her vagina in the presence of the Baniszewski children before Gertrude ordered her into the basement.

Gertrude called [Sylvia] upstairs to the kitchen. Somehow, the conversation got around to tattooing. Gertrude asked Sylvia whether she knew what a tattoo was ... she said: 'You branded my children so now I'm going to brand you.' "

— Richard Hobbs, testifying as to Gertrude Baniszewski's decision to carve an insult into Likens's abdomen on October 23, 1965.

Shortly thereafter, Gertrude shouted for Likens to return to the kitchen, then ordered her to strip naked before proclaiming to her: "You have branded my daughters; now I am going to brand you." She began carving the words "I'M A PROSTITUTE AND PROUD OF IT" onto Likens's abdomen with a heated needle.

When Gertrude was unable to finish the branding, she instructed one of the neighborhood children present, 14-year-old Richard Dean Hobbs, to finish etching the words into Likens's flesh as she took Jenny to a nearby grocery store. In what Hobbs would later insist were "short, light" etchings, he continued to brand the text into Likens's abdomen as she clenched her teeth and moaned. Both Hobbs and 10-year-old Shirley Baniszewski then led Likens into the basement where each proceeded to use an anchor bolt in an attempt to burn the letter "S" beneath Likens's left breast, although they applied one section of the loop backwards, and this deep burn scar would resemble the number 3.

Gertrude later taunted Likens by claiming she would never be able to marry due to the words carved on her stomach, stating: "Sylvia, what are you going to do now? You can't get married now. What are you going to do?" Weeping, Likens replied, "I guess there's nothing I can do." Later that day, Likens was forced to display the carving to neighborhood children, with Gertrude claiming she had received the inscription at a sex party.

That night, Sylvia confided to her sister: "Jenny, I know you don't want me to die, but I'm going to die. I can tell it."

The following day, Gertrude Baniszewski woke Likens, then forced her to write a letter as she dictated the contents, which were intended to mislead her parents into believing their daughter had run away from the Baniszewski residence. The content of this letter was intended to frame a group of anonymous local boys for extensively abusing and mutilating Likens after she had initially agreed to engage in sexual relations with them before they inflicted the extreme abuse and torture upon her body. After Likens had written this letter, Gertrude finished formulating her plan to have John Jr. and Jenny blindfold Sylvia, then take her to a nearby wooded area known as Jimmy's Forest and leave her there to die.

After she had finished writing the letter, Likens was then again tied to the stair railing and offered crackers to eat, although she refused them, saying: "Give it to the dog, I don't want it." In response, Gertrude forced the crackers into Likens's mouth before she and John Baniszewski beat her—particularly around the stomach.

=== October 25–26 ===
On October 25, Likens attempted to escape from the basement after overhearing a conversation between Gertrude and John Baniszewski Jr. pertaining to the family's plan to abandon her to die. She attempted to flee to the front door; however, due to her extensive injuries and general weakness, Gertrude caught her before she could escape the property. Likens was then given crackers to eat but was unable to consume the food due to her extreme state of dehydration. Gertrude forced the crackers into her mouth before repeatedly striking her face with a curtain rod until sections of the instrument were bent into right angles. Coy Hubbard then took the curtain rod from Gertrude and struck Likens one further time, rendering her unconscious. Gertrude then dragged Likens into the basement.

That evening, Likens desperately attempted to alert neighbors by screaming for help and hitting the walls of the basement with a spade. One immediate neighbor of the Baniszewskis later informed police she had heard the desperate commotion and that she had identified the source as emanating from the basement of 3850 East New York Street, but that as the noise had suddenly ceased at approximately 3:00 a.m., she decided not to inform police about the disturbance.

==== Death ====
By the morning of October 26, Likens was unable to either speak intelligibly or correctly coordinate the movement of her limbs. Gertrude moved Likens into the kitchen and, having propped her back against a wall, attempted to feed her a doughnut and a glass of milk. She threw Likens to the floor in frustration when Likens was unable to correctly move the glass of milk to her lips. She was then returned to the basement.

Shortly thereafter, Likens became delirious, repeatedly moaning and mumbling. When Paula asked her to recite the English alphabet, Likens was unable to recite anything beyond the first four letters or to raise herself off the ground. In response, Paula verbally threatened her to either stand up or she would inflict a long jump upon her. Gertrude then ordered Likens, who had defecated, to clean herself.

That afternoon, several of Likens's other tormentors gathered in the basement. Likens jerkingly moved her arms in an apparent attempt to point at the faces of the tormentors she could recognize, making statements such as, "You're ... Ricky" and "You're Gertie" before Gertrude tersely shouted, "Shut up! You know who I am!" Minutes later, Likens unsuccessfully attempted to bite into a rotten pear she had been given to eat, stating she could feel the looseness in her teeth. Upon hearing this, Jenny replied: "Don't you remember, Sylvia? Your front tooth was knocked out when you were seven." Jenny then left Sylvia in the basement to perform gardening chores for neighbors in the hope of earning spending money.

In an attempt to wash Likens, a laughing John Baniszewski Jr. sprayed her with a garden hose brought to the house that afternoon by Randy Lepper at Gertrude's request. Likens again desperately attempted to exit the basement but collapsed before she could reach the stairs. In response to this effort, Gertrude stamped upon Likens's head before standing and staring at her for several moments. Shortly after 5:30 p.m., Richard Hobbs returned to the Baniszewski residence and immediately proceeded to the basement. He slipped on the wet basement stairs and fell heavily to the floor of the basement to be confronted with the sight of Stephanie crying and cuddling Likens's emaciated and lacerated body after she had been ordered by her mother to clean Sylvia.

Stephanie and Richard then decided to give Likens a warm, soapy bath and dress her in new clothes. They then laid her upon a mattress in one of the bedrooms as Sylvia muttered her final wish that her "daddy was here" and that Stephanie would take her home. Stephanie then turned to her younger sister, Shirley, exclaiming, "Oh! She'll be alright!"

When Stephanie realized that Likens was not breathing, she attempted to apply mouth-to-mouth resuscitation as Gertrude repeatedly shouted to the children in the house that Likens was faking her death. Likens was 16 years old when she finally succumbed to her injuries.

==== Arrests ====
Gertrude Baniszewski initially beat Likens's corpse with a book, shouting "Faker! Faker!" in order to rouse her. However, she soon panicked and instructed Richard Hobbs to call the police from a nearby payphone. When police arrived at her address at approximately 6:30 p.m., Gertrude led the officers to Likens's emaciated, extensively bludgeoned, and mutilated body lying upon a soiled mattress in the bedroom before handing them the letter she had forced Likens to write previously by her dictation. She also claimed she had been "doctoring" the child for an hour or more prior to her death, having applied rubbing alcohol to Likens's wounds in a futile attempt at first aid before she had died. She added that Likens had earlier run away from her home with several teenage boys before returning to her house earlier that afternoon, bare-breasted and clutching the note.

Clutching a Bible, Paula Baniszewski, having stated to all present in the household that Likens's death was "meant to happen," then glanced in Jenny's direction and calmly stated: "If you want to live with us, Jenny, we'll treat you like our own sister."

As previously instructed by Gertrude, Jenny Likens recited the rehearsed version of events leading to Likens's death to police, before whispering to the officers: "You get me out of here and I'll tell you everything."

The formal statement provided by Jenny Likens prompted officers to arrest Gertrude, Paula, Stephanie, and John Baniszewski Jr. on suspicion of Likens's murder within hours of the discovery of her body. The same day, Coy Hubbard and Richard Hobbs were also arrested and charged with the same offenses. The three eldest Baniszewski children, plus Coy Hubbard, were placed in the custody of a nearby juvenile detention center; the younger Baniszewski children and Richard Hobbs were detained at the Indianapolis Children's Guardians Home. All were held without bail pending trial.

Initially, Gertrude denied any involvement in Likens's death, although by October 27 she had confessed to having known "the kids," particularly her daughter Paula and Coy Hubbard, had physically and emotionally abused Likens, stating: "Paula did most of the damage," and "Coy Hubbard did a lot of the beating." Gertrude further admitted to having forced the girl to sleep in the basement on approximately three occasions when she had wet the bed. She became evasive when one officer stated the likely reasons Likens had become incontinent were her mental distress and injury to her kidneys.

Lacking any remorse, Paula signed a statement admitting to having repeatedly beaten Likens about the backside with her mother's police belt, once breaking her wrist on Likens's jaw, and inflicting other acts of brutality, including pushing her down the stairs into the basement "two or three times," and inflicting a black eye. John Jr. admitted to having "spanked" Sylvia on one occasion, adding that "most of the time, I used my fists" to abuse her. He admitted to having burned Sylvia with matches on several occasions, adding that his mother had repeatedly burned the child with cigarettes.

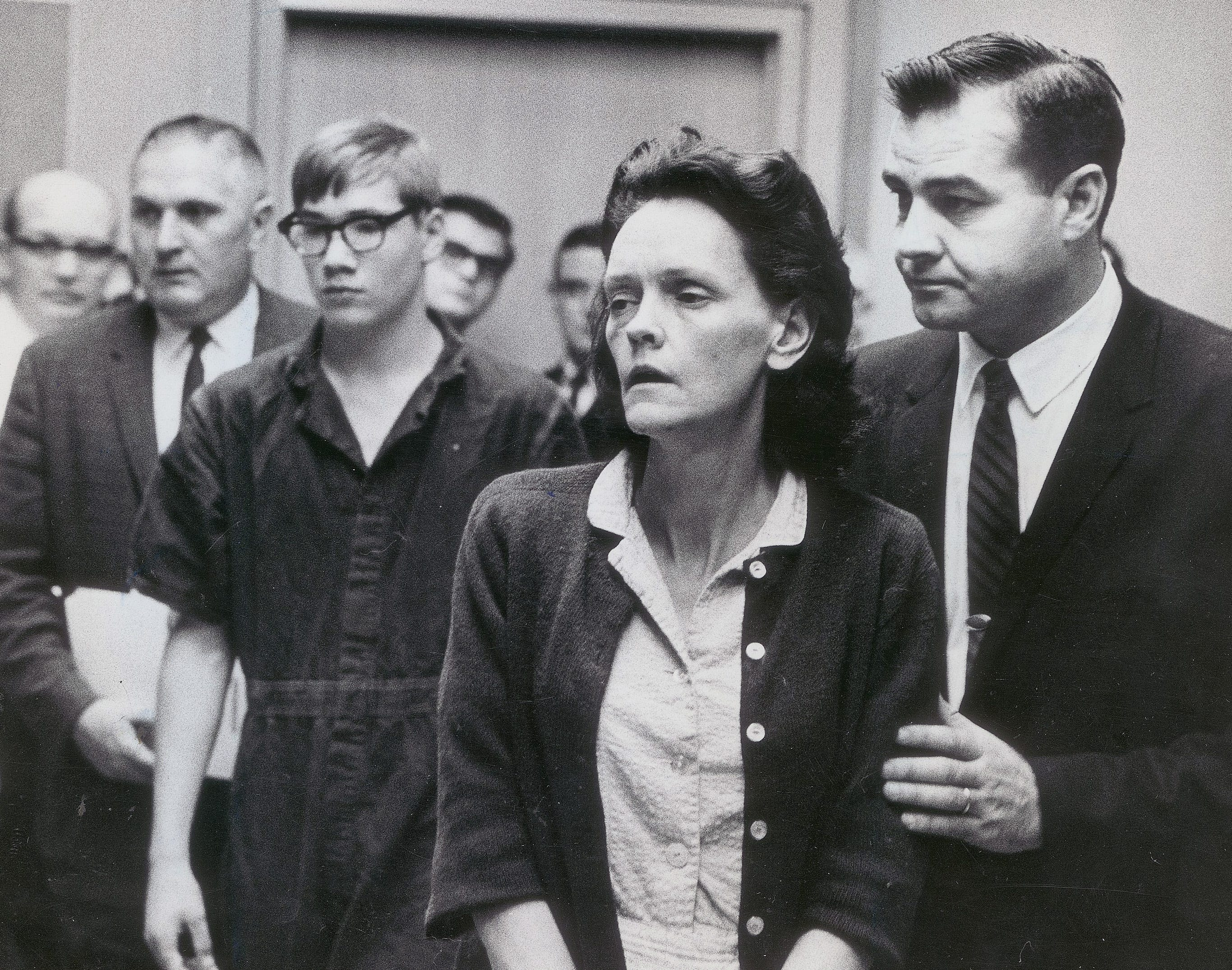
Richard Hobbs and Gertrude Baniszewski at a hearing before Marion County Judge Harry Zaklan, November 1, 1965. Both were formally charged with murder on this date.

Five other neighborhood children who had participated in Likens's abuse — Michael Monroe, Randy Lepper, Darlene McGuire, Judy Duke, and Anna Siscoe — had also been arrested by October 29. All were charged with causing injury to person and each was subsequently released into the custody of their parents under subpoena to appear as witnesses at the upcoming trial.

== Autopsy ==
The autopsy of Likens's body revealed she had suffered in excess of 150 separate wounds across her entire body, in addition to being extremely emaciated at the time of her death. The wounds themselves varied in location, nature, severity, and the stage of healing. Her injuries included burns, severe bruising, and extensive muscle and nerve damage. Her vaginal cavity was almost swollen shut. Moreover, all of Likens's fingernails were broken backwards (Note: The injuries discovered upon and around Likens's fingernails would later be described as most likely having been inflicted via her "desperate scratching motions" at the trial of her tormentors and murderers.) and most of the external layers of skin upon the child's face, breasts, neck, and right knee had peeled or receded. In her death throes, Likens had evidently bitten through her lips, partially severing sections of them from her face.

The official cause of Likens's death was listed by coroner Dr. Arthur Kebel as a subdural hematoma due to her receiving a severe blow to her right temple. Both the shock she had primarily suffered due to the severe and prolonged damage inflicted to her skin and subcutaneous tissues, plus the severe malnutrition, were listed as contributory factors to her death. Rigor mortis had fully developed at the time of the discovery of her body, indicating Likens may have been deceased for up to eight hours before she was found, although Dr. Kebel did note Likens had been recently bathed—possibly after death—and that this act could have hastened the loss of body temperature and thus sped the onset of rigor mortis.

== Funeral ==
The funeral service for Sylvia Likens was conducted at the Russell & Hitch Funeral Home in Lebanon, Indiana, on the afternoon of October 29. The service was officiated by the Reverend Louis Gibson, with more than 100 mourners in attendance. Likens's gray casket remained open throughout the ceremony, with a portrait of her taken prior to July 1965 adorning her coffin.

In his eulogy, the Reverend Gibson stated: "We all have our time (of passing), but we won't suffer like our little sister suffered during the last days of her life." The Reverend Gibson then strode towards Likens's casket before adding, "She has gone to eternity."

Following this service, Likens's casket was placed by pallbearers in a hearse and driven to the Oak Hill Cemetery to be interred. This hearse was one of a 14-vehicle procession to drive to the cemetery for Likens's burial. Her headstone is inscribed with an abbreviation of "Our Darling Daughter."

== Indictments ==
On December 30, 1965, the Marion County grand jury returned first-degree murder indictments against Gertrude Baniszewski and two of her three oldest children, Paula and John Baniszewski Jr. Also indicted were Richard Hobbs and Coy Hubbard. All were charged with having repeatedly struck, beaten, kicked, and otherwise inflicting a culmination of fatal injuries to Sylvia Likens with premeditated malice. (Note: On January 13, 1966, Paula Baniszewski gave birth to a baby daughter. She named her child Gertrude in honor of her mother.)

Three weeks prior to the filing of the indictments against the five defendants, Stephanie Baniszewski had been released from custody upon a writ of habeas corpus bond, with her attorney successfully contending the state had insufficient evidence to support any murder or culmination of fatal injuries charges against her. Stephanie waived her immunity from any potential impending prosecution while agreeing to testify against her family and any other individuals charged with abusing and murdering Likens.

She (Paula) represented the situation as one in which the girl Sylvia had become quite withdrawn and negativistic in her behavior to the extent that she refused to eat and showed no response to pain.

— Section of Paula Baniszewski's psychiatric evaluation detailing her indifference to Likens's mistreatment, February 1966.

At a formal pretrial hearing held on March 16, 1966, several psychiatrists testified before Judge Saul Isaac Rabb as to their conclusions regarding psychiatric evaluations they had conducted upon three individuals indicted in Likens's murder. These experts testified that all three were mentally competent to stand trial.

== Trial ==
The trial of Gertrude Baniszewski, her children Paula and John, Richard Hobbs and Coy Hubbard began on April 18, 1966. All were tried together before Judge Rabb at Indianapolis's City-County Building.

Initial jury selection began on this date and continued for several days. The prosecution consisted of Leroy K. New and Marjorie Wessner, who announced their intention to seek the death penalty for all five defendants on April 16. They also successfully argued before Judge Rabb that all the defendants should be tried together as they were ultimately charged with acting "in concert" in their collective crimes against Likens and that as such, if each were tried separately, neither judge nor jury could hear testimony relating to a "total picture" of the accumulation of offenses committed. (Note: Contemporary law in Indiana presumed children beneath the age of 15 at the time of the offense to be incapable of any criminal intent, although this presumption could be rebutted by sufficient evidence. Only children younger than seven were completely exempt from prosecution.)

Each prospective juror was questioned by counsel for both prosecution and defense in relation to their opinions regarding capital punishment being a just penalty for first-degree murder and whether a mother was actually responsible for the "deportment of her children." Jurors who expressed any opposition to the death penalty were excused from duty by Leroy New; any who either worked with children, expressed prejudice against an insanity defense, or repulsion regarding the actual horrific nature of Likens's death were excused by the defense counsel.

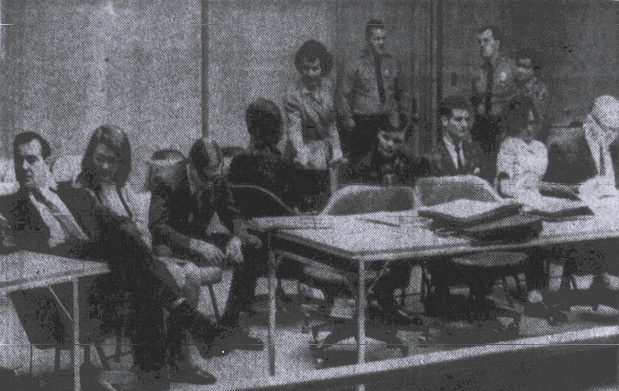
Defense attorneys James Nedeff (far left) and William Erbecker (far right), pictured seated alongside each of the defendants and Stephanie Baniszewski (second left), April 1966

Gertrude Baniszewski was defended by William Erbecker; her daughter Paula was defended by George Rice. Richard Hobbs was defended by James G. Nedeff; John Baniszewski Jr. and Coy Hubbard were defended by Forrest Bowman. The attorneys for Richard Hobbs, Coy Hubbard, Paula and John Baniszewski Jr. claimed they had been pressured into participating in Likens's torment, abuse, and torture by Gertrude Baniszewski. Gertrude herself pleaded not guilty by reason of insanity.

=== Testimony ===
One of the first witnesses to testify on behalf of the prosecution was deputy coroner Charles Ellis, who testified on April 29 as to the intense pain Likens had suffered, stating that her fingernails were broken backwards, numerous deep cuts and punctures covered much of her body, and that her lips were "essentially in shreds" due to her having repeatedly bitten and chewed upon them. Ellis further testified that Likens had been in an acute state of shock for between two and three days prior to her death and that Likens may have been in too advanced a state of shock to offer much resistance to any form of subjected treatment in her final hours. He emphasized that aside from the extensive swelling inside and around her genitalia, Likens's body bore no evidence of direct sexual molestation.

On May 2 and 3, Jenny Likens testified against all five defendants, stating that each had repeatedly and extensively, both physically and emotionally, abused her sister, adding that Likens had done nothing to provoke the assaults and that there had been no truth in either the rumors she had been falsely accused of spreading or the slurs each had made against Likens's character. During her testimony, Jenny stated the abuse her sister and, to a much lesser degree, she herself had endured began approximately two weeks after they had begun to live in the Baniszewski household, and that as the abuse her sister was forced to endure escalated, Likens had occasionally been unable to produce tears due to her acute state of dehydration. Jenny burst into tears as she recalled how, just days before Likens died, she had said to her, "Jenny, I know you don't want me to die, but I am going to die. I can tell it!"

Sections of Jenny Likens's testimony were later corroborated by that of Randy Lepper, who stated he had once witnessed Likens crying, but that she had shed no actual tears. Lepper also testified to having witnessed Stephanie strike Likens "real hard" after her mother had ordered her to remove her clothes in his presence. He then visibly smirked as he confessed to having himself beaten Likens on anywhere between ten and forty separate instances.

On May 10, a Baptist minister named Roy Julian testified to having known a teenage girl was being abused in the Baniszewski household, although he had failed to report this information to authorities as, having been informed by Gertrude that Likens had "made advances to men for money," he had believed the girl was being punished for soliciting. The same day, 13-year-old Judy Duke also testified, admitting to having witnessed Likens once endure salt being rubbed into sores upon her legs until she screamed. Duke also testified to one occasion where she witnessed 10-year-old Shirley Baniszewski rip open Likens's blouse, to which Richard Hobbs had made the casual remark, "Everybody's having fun with Sylvia." Also to testify on this date was an individual who, when referencing the herd mentality of the Baniszewski family throughout Likens's ordeal, emphasized that "all of the family with the exception of the 18-month-old baby" had actively participated in her ongoing and escalating abuse.

The following day, Gertrude Baniszewski testified in her own defense. She denied any responsibility for Likens's prolonged abuse, torment, and ultimate death, claiming her children, and other children within her neighborhood must have committed the acts within her home, which she described as being "such a madhouse". She also added that she had been too preoccupied with her own ill health and depression to control her children.

In response to questioning relating to whether she had physically abused the Likens sisters, Gertrude claimed that although she had "started to spank" Likens on one occasion, she was emotionally unable to finish doing so, and had not hit the child on any further occasions. She denied any knowledge of Likens having ever endured any beating, scalding, branding, or burning within her home.

Two days later, Richard Hobbs testified in his own defense, describing how Gertrude had called Likens to the kitchen on October 23 and stated, "You have branded my children so now I'm going to brand you." Hobbs testified Gertrude had begun etching the insult into Likens's abdomen before asking him to finish the task. Although Hobbs testified this act of branding had brought blood to the surface of Likens's flesh and that Likens had begged him to stop, he remained adamant the section of branding he had inflicted had been light. Hobbs further testified that he had initially believed Likens would not be at the Baniszewski household on October 26, as Gertrude had informed him she intended to "get rid of" Sylvia the day prior. He further stated that, after Likens's death, he had simply returned home to watch "the rest of The Lloyd Thaxton Show."

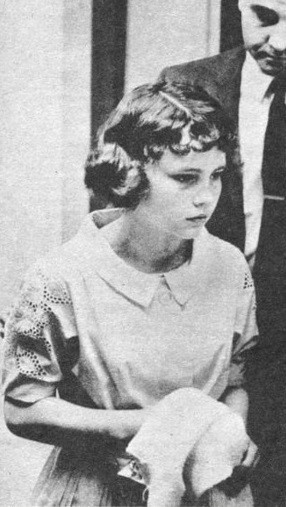
Marie Baniszewski, pictured prior to her trial testimony on May 12, 1966

When Marie Baniszewski was called to the stand as a witness for the defense, she broke down and admitted that she had heated the needle which Hobbs had used to brand Likens's abdomen. Marie also testified as to her mother's indifference to Likens's evident distress in relation to the physical and mental abuse Likens had increasingly suffered, with her mother's full knowledge, stating that on one occasion, Gertrude had sat upon a chair and crocheted as she watched a neighborhood girl named Anna Siscoe attack Likens. In reference to Coy Hubbard, Marie testified, "He'd get down in a football huddle and he'd run right into [her abdomen] until she'd scream." Marie added that although all five defendants had repeatedly physically and mentally tormented Likens, she had most often witnessed her mother and sister committing these acts (Note: Testimony delivered at trial clearly illustrated Paula Baniszewski and her mother as being the most enthusiastic participants in Likens's abuse and torture.) before her mother had forced Likens to live in the basement where the abuse had further escalated and she had ultimately died.

Another witness to testify on behalf of the prosecution, Grace Sargent, stated how she had sat close to Paula on a church bus and had heard her openly bragging about breaking her own wrist due to the severity of a beating she had inflicted to Likens's face on August 1. Sargent testified Paula had finished her boasting by stating, "I tried to kill her!"

On May 16, a court-appointed doctor named Dwight Schuster testified on behalf of the prosecution. When questioned by Leroy New as to the exhaustive interviews and assessments he had conducted with Gertrude, Schuster stated that she had been evasive and uncooperative. Schuster testified as to his belief that Gertrude was sane and fully in control of her actions, adding that she had been sane in October 1965, and remained sane to this date. Dr. Schuster was subjected to over two hours of intense cross-examination by Gertrude's lawyer, William Erbecker, although he remained steadfast that Gertrude was not and had never been psychotic.

== Closing arguments ==
=== Prosecution ===
Deputy Prosecutor Marjorie Wessner delivered the state's closing argument before the jury on behalf of the prosecution. As each defendant, except Richard Hobbs, remained impassive, Wessner recounted the continuous mistreatment Likens had endured before her death, emphasizing that at no point had Likens either provoked any of the defendants, or received any medical care beyond occasionally having margarine rubbed into scalded sections of her face and body. Referencing specific forms and means of abuse and neglect at the defendants' hands and their collective failure to either help Likens or deter each other from mistreating her, Wessner described Likens's abuse as "stomach-wrenching" and compared her treatment at the hands of all five defendants as being the equivalent in severity to that committed against prisoners in Nazi concentration camps.

There was practically no fat on [Sylvia's] body. She hadn't eaten for a week! We'll never know the pain and suffering that Sylvia endured ... the best evidence of that was the picture of her lips—lips that were bitten into shreds!"

— Section of Deputy Prosecutor Marjorie Wessner's closing argument at the trial of Gertrude Baniszewski.

In reference to the premeditated nature of Likens's death, Wessner pointed the jury's attention to the notes Gertrude had forced Likens to write on October 24, stating: "[Gertrude] knew on [October 24] she was going to hold these notes until she and the rest of the defendants had completed the murder of Sylvia." Holding aloft a portrait of Likens taken before July 1965, Wessner added: "I wish she were here today, with eyes as in this picture—full of hope and anticipation."

=== Defense ===
William Erbecker was the first defense attorney to deliver his closing argument before the jury; he attempted to portray his client as being insane and thus unable to appreciate the severity or criminality of her actions, stating: "I condemn her for being a murderess, that's what I do, but I say she's not responsible, because she's not all here!" Erbecker then tapped his head to emphasize his reference to her state of mind, before adding: "If this woman is sane, put her in [the electric chair]. She committed acts of degradation that you wouldn't commit on a dog ... She has to be crazy, or she wouldn't have permitted that. You'll have to live with your conscience the rest of your life if you send an insane woman to the electric chair." Holding aloft an autopsy photograph of Likens, Erbecker instructed the jury to "look at this exhibit", adding: "Look at the lips on that girl! How sadistic can a person get? The woman [Gertrude] is stark mad!" Erbecker then referred to the earlier testimony of a psychiatrist who had called into question Gertrude's sanity before concluding his argument.

Forrest Bowman began his closing argument in an openly critical manner as he attacked the decision of the prosecution to seek the death penalty for juveniles, stating: "I would like to have an hour of [the jury's] time to explain why 16-year-olds and 13-year-olds should not be put to death." Refraining from acknowledging the catalog of atrocities each had inflicted upon Likens, Bowman repeatedly emphasized his clients' ages, stating each was only guilty of assault and battery before seeking a verdict of not guilty for each youth.

George Rice began his closing argument by decrying the fact Paula and the other defendants had been tried jointly. Sidestepping the multiple instances of testimony delivered at trial describing Paula and her mother as by far the most enthusiastic participants in Likens's physical abuse, Rice claimed the evidence presented against his client did not equate to her actual guilt of murder. He then ended his closing argument with a plea for the jury to return a verdict of not guilty on a girl who had "gone through the indignity of being tried in an open court".

James Nedeff began his closing argument in defense of Richard Hobbs by referring to the loss of Likens, stating: "She had a right to live. In my own heart I cannot remember a girl so much sinned against and abused." He then referred to Hobbs' courage in opting to testify in his own defense and the "savage and relentless cross-examination" to which he had been subjected by Leroy New. Nedeff attempted to portray his client as a follower-type personality who had acted under the control of Gertrude Baniszewski, suggesting that had he not carved part of the obscene insult into Likens's abdomen at Gertrude's request, Hobbs could well have been a state's witness as opposed to Stephanie Baniszewski. He then referred to Jenny's overall failure to notify authorities of her sister's abuse until she had already died, describing her as "a sister who could limp three-and-a-half miles to a park but couldn't take two or three steps out into New York Street to beg for help!"

Nedeff ended his closing argument by requesting a verdict of not guilty, stating Hobbs was "guilty of immaturity and gross lack of judgement", but not of the crime of murder.

=== Rebuttal ===
Leroy New rebutted the defense counsels' closing arguments by promising to "speak through the mangled and shredded lips of Sylvia Likens. I see her wherever I look". Outlining the catalog of mistreatment Likens had endured prior to her death at the hands of each of the defendants, New directly addressed criticism he had earlier received from Forrest Bowman in his closing argument regarding the prosecution "cross-examining children", stating: "The prosecutors' job is to present the evidence to the best of our ability. Now, let's look at some of the responsibilities here. Each one of [the] five defendants had first and foremost the responsibility to leave Sylvia Likens alone; we had the responsibility to bring all the evidence we could find that could explain this crime."

Referring to the sentimental closing arguments made by various defense counsels regarding reasoning and motivation for their clients' actions, their attempts to divert responsibility to other defendants or participants, and their clients' collective failure to either help Likens or to notify authorities, New added: "All we hear is whining appeal, anything but blame where the blame belongs." He poured scorn over Erbecker's claim his client was insane—referencing the testimony of three psychiatrists who had each testified as to Gertrude's sanity—before speculating as to the reason Likens did not try to escape from the Baniszewski household prior to the abuse increasingly escalating in the final weeks of her life, stating: "I think she trusted in man ... I think she did not believe these people would do this and continue to do it."

New concluded his closing argument by emphasizing the defendants' unison in their collective mistreatment of Likens, before asking the jury to dismiss arguments made by various defense counsels regarding who may have actually inflicted the "fatal blow" to Likens's head, stating: "Every mark on that girl's body contributed directly to her death, and that was testimony. The subdural hematoma was the ultimate blow. This is the most hideous thing Indiana has ever seen and, I hope, will ever see." Stating that "not a shred of evidence" had been produced indicating any defendant was suffering from a form of mental illness, New again requested the death penalty for each defendant, stating to the jury: "The issue here is not about the electric chair, or a hospital, but about law and order. Will we shy away from the most diabolical case to ever come before a court or jury? If you go below the death penalty (in your verdicts) in this case, you will lower the value of human life by that much for each defendant. The blood of this girl will forevermore be on their souls."

== Convictions ==
The trial of the five defendants lasted 17 days before the jury retired to consider its verdict. On May 19, 1966, after deliberating for eight hours, the panel of eight men and four women found Gertrude Baniszewski guilty of first-degree murder, recommending a sentence of life imprisonment. Paula Baniszewski was found guilty of second-degree murder, and Hobbs, Hubbard, and John Baniszewski Jr. were found guilty of manslaughter. Upon hearing Judge Rabb pronounce the verdicts, Gertrude and her children burst into tears and attempted to console each other, with Gertrude embracing her son and crying, "John! John! My baby!" as Hobbs and Hubbard remained impassive.

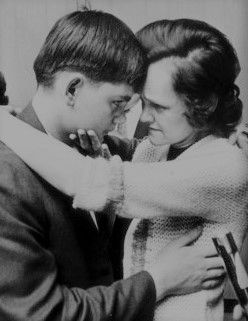
Gertrude Baniszewski and her son, John Baniszewski Jr., following their conviction for Likens's murder, May 19, 1966

On May 25, Gertrude and Paula Baniszewski were formally sentenced to life imprisonment. The same day, Richard Hobbs, Coy Hubbard, and John Baniszewski Jr. each received sentences of two to twenty-one years, to be served in the Indiana Reformatory. (Note: Contemporary Indiana law stipulated that a jury may only recommend the death penalty be imposed upon returning a verdict of guilty of first-degree murder against a defendant. An individual convicted of second-degree murder typically received a sentence of life imprisonment with parole eligibility after fifteen years, whereas an individual convicted of manslaughter typically received a sentence of two- to twenty-one years' imprisonment.)

=== Retrials ===
In September 1970, the Indiana Supreme Court reversed the convictions of Gertrude and Paula Baniszewski on the basis that Judge Saul Isaac Rabb had denied repeatedly submitted motions by their defense counsel at their original trial, for both a change of venue and separate trials. This ruling further stated that the circumstances regarding the prejudicial atmosphere created during their initial trial, due to the extensive news media publicity surrounding the case, impeded any chance of either appellant receiving a fair trial.

The pair were retried in 1971. On this occasion, Paula Baniszewski opted to plead guilty to voluntary manslaughter rather than face a retrial; she was sentenced to serve a term of between two and twenty years' imprisonment for her part in Likens's abuse and death. Despite twice unsuccessfully having attempted to escape from prison in 1971, she was released in December 1972. Gertrude Baniszewski, however, was again convicted of first-degree murder and sentenced to life in prison.

Over the course of the following fourteen years, Gertrude Baniszewski became known as a model prisoner at the Indiana Women's Prison. She worked in the prison sewing shop and was known as somewhat of a "den mother" to younger female inmates, becoming known to some within the prison by the nickname "Mom". By the time of Gertrude's ultimate parole in 1985, she had changed her name to Nadine Van Fossan (a combination of her middle name and maiden name), and described herself as a devout Christian.

== Parole ==
News of Gertrude Baniszewski's impending parole hearing created an uproar throughout Indiana. Jenny Likens and other immediate family members of Likens vehemently protested against any prospect of her release. The members of two anti-crime groups also traveled to Indiana to oppose Baniszewski's potential parole, and to publicly support the Likens family. Members of both groups initiated a sidewalk picket campaign. Over the course of two months, these groups collected over 40,000 signatures from the citizens of Indiana, including signatures obtained from outraged citizens who were too young to contemporarily recollect the case in addition to former inmates who had become acquainted with Baniszewski during her incarceration and who described her as a cynical con artist who had never expressed remorse for her crime. All signatures gathered demanded that Gertrude Baniszewski remain incarcerated for the remainder of her life.

Within her parole hearing, Baniszewski stated her wish that Likens's death could "be undone", although she minimized her responsibility for any of her actions, stating: "I'm not sure what role I had in [Likens's death], because I was on drugs. I never really knew her ... I take full responsibility for whatever happened to Sylvia." Taking Gertrude's good conduct in prison into account, the parole board marginally voted in favor of granting her parole. She was released from prison on December 4, 1985.

== Aftermath ==
Following her 1985 release from prison, Gertrude Baniszewski relocated to Iowa. She never accepted full responsibility for Likens's prolonged torment and death, insisting she was unable to precisely recall any of her actions in the months of Likens's abuse and torment within her home. She primarily blamed her actions upon the medication she had been prescribed to treat her asthma. Gertrude Baniszewski lived in relative obscurity in Laurel, Iowa, until her death due to lung cancer on June 16, 1990, at the age of 61.

Regarding Gertrude Baniszewski's death and the issues raised pertaining to her sanity at both of her trials, John Dean, a former reporter for The Indianapolis Star who had provided extensive coverage of the case, stated in 2015, "I never thought she was insane. I thought she was a downtrodden, mean woman." Dean has also likened the case to William Golding's debut novel Lord of the Flies (1954), although he has stated Likens's increasing physical and emotional abuse was not a result of "children going wild; it was children doing what they were told". Of Baniszewski's actual motive for tormenting and ultimately murdering Likens, attorney Forrest Bowman opined in 2014, "She had a miserable life. What I think this was ultimately about was jealousy."

After her 1972 parole, Paula Baniszewski assumed a new identity. She worked as an aide to a school counselor for fourteen years at the Beaman-Conrad-Liscomb-Union-Whitten Community School in Conrad, Iowa, having changed her name to Paula Pace, and concealing the truth regarding her criminal history when applying for the position. She was fired in 2012 when the school discovered her true identity. Paula married and had two children. The baby daughter to whom she had given birth while awaiting trial in 1966, and whom she named after her mother, was later adopted.

The murder charges initially filed against Gertrude Baniszewski's second-eldest daughter, 15-year-old Stephanie, were ultimately dropped after she agreed to turn state's evidence against the other defendants. Although prosecutors did re-submit their case against Stephanie before a grand jury on May 26, 1966, the decision to later prosecute her in a separate trial never materialized. Stephanie Baniszewski assumed a new name and became a school teacher. She later married and had several children. Stephanie Serikstad was last known to have resided in Florida.

When questioned at trial as to her motive for turning state's evidence, Stephanie stated, "I'm just here in the hope I can help anybody!" In response, her mother's attorney, William Erbecker replied, "Including yourself?"

Shortly after their mother's arrest, the Marion County Department of Public Welfare placed Marie, Shirley, and James Baniszewski in the care of separate foster families. The surname of all three children was legally changed to Blake in the late 1960s after their father regained their custody. Marie later married. Marie Shelton died of natural causes on June 8, 2017, at the age of 62. Dennis Lee Wright Jr. was later adopted. His adoptive mother named him Denny Lee White. He died on February 5, 2012, at the age of 47.

Richard Hobbs, Coy Hubbard, and John Baniszewski Jr. all served less than two years in the Indiana Reformatory before being granted parole on February 27, 1968.

Richard Hobbs died of lung cancer on January 2, 1972, at the age of 21 — less than four years after his release from the Indiana Reformatory. In the years between his release from the Indiana Reformatory and his death, he is known to have suffered at least one nervous breakdown.

Following his 1968 release from the Indiana Reformatory, Coy Hubbard remained in Indiana, and never attempted to change his name. Throughout his adult life, Hubbard was repeatedly imprisoned for various criminal offenses, on one occasion being charged with the 1977 murders of two young men, although, largely due to the fact that the chief witness to testify at his trial had been a convicted criminal acquaintance of Hubbard who admitted to having been in his company at the time of the murders, he was acquitted of this charge. Shortly after the January 2007 premiere of the crime drama film An American Crime, Hubbard was fired from his job. He died of a heart attack in Shelbyville, Indiana, on June 23 of that year at the age of 56.

John Stephan Baniszewski Jr. lived in relative obscurity under the alias John Blake. He became a lay minister, frequently hosting counseling sessions for the children of divorced parents. Several decades after his release from the Indiana Reformatory, John Baniszewski Jr. issued a statement in which he acknowledged the fact he and his co-defendants should have been sentenced to a more severe term of punishment, adding that young criminals are not beyond rehabilitation and describing how he had become a productive citizen. He died of diabetes in the Lancaster General Hospital on May 19, 2005, at the age of 52. Prior to his death, he had also occasionally spoken publicly about his past, readily admitting he had enjoyed the attention Likens's murder brought upon him and also claiming to have "only ever hit Sylvia once".

The injury-to-person charges brought against the other juveniles known to have actively physically, mentally, and emotionally tormented Likens (Anna Ruth Siscoe, Judy Darlene Duke, Michael John Monroe, Darlene McGuire, and Randy Gordon Lepper), were later dropped. Siscoe died on October 23, 1996, at the age of 44, already a grandmother. Lepper—who had visibly smirked as he testified to having hit Likens on up to forty separate occasions—died at the age of 56 on November 14, 2010. Monroe died on February 16, 2023, at the age of 68.

Jenny Likens later married an Indianapolis native named Leonard Rece Wade. The couple had two children, although she remained traumatized by the abuse she had been forced to watch her sister endure. For the remainder of her life, Jenny was dependent upon anxiety medication. She died of a heart attack on June 23, 2004, at the age of 54, in Beech Grove, Indiana.

Fourteen years before her own death, Jenny Likens Wade had viewed Gertrude Baniszewski's obituary in a newspaper; she clipped the section from the newspaper, then mailed it to her mother with an accompanying note reading: "Some good news. Damn old Gertrude died. Ha ha ha! I am happy about that."

Elizabeth and Lester Likens died in 1998 and 2013, respectively. In the years prior to her own death, Jenny Likens Wade had repeatedly emphasized that no blame should be attributed to either of her parents for placing her and Sylvia in the care of Gertrude Baniszewski as all her parents had done was naively trust Gertrude's promise to care for the sisters until their return to Indiana with the traveling carnival.

The granite memorial dedicated to the memory of Sylvia Likens and her legacy, formally unveiled in June 2001

The house at 3850 East New York Street in which Likens had been tortured and murdered stood vacant for many years after her death and the arrest of her tormentors. The property gradually became dilapidated. Although discussions were held about the possibility of purchasing and rehabilitating the house and converting the property into a women's shelter, the necessary funds to complete this project were never raised. The house itself was demolished on April 23, 2009. The site is now a church parking lot.

== Memorials and legacy ==
In June 2001, a six-foot-tall (1.8 m) granite memorial was formally dedicated to Sylvia Likens's life and legacy in Willard Park, Washington Street, Indianapolis. This dedication was attended by several hundred people, including members of the Likens family. The memorial itself is inscribed with these words: "This memorial is in memory of a young child who died a tragic death. As a result, laws changed and awareness increased. This is a commitment to our children, that the Indianapolis Police Department is working to make this a safe city for our children."

I see a light:
Hope.
I feel a breeze:
Strength.
I hear a song:
Relief.
Let them through, for they are the welcome ones!"

— Poem inscribed upon the granite memorial formally dedicated to Sylvia Likens's life and legacy in Willard Park, Indianapolis.

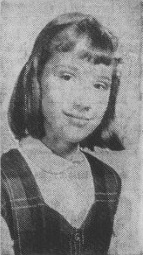
Sylvia, c. 1961

Sylvia Likens's death is credited with the adoption of Indiana's mandated reporter law, and with an increased understanding of the investigation and recognition of abuse. The law states that should a member of the public suspect a child is suffering abuse or neglect, the citizen suspecting this abuse has a legal obligation to report the abuse to authorities.

On October 26, 2015, numerous Indianapolis citizens, including Likens's older sister, Dianna Bedwell, gathered in Lebanon, Indiana, to honor Sylvia Likens, to reflect upon her life upon the fiftieth anniversary of her death, and to honor all children who lose their lives to child abuse. At this memorial service, Dianna informed those present that Sylvia's legacy "must always be remembered. Sylvia's tragic murder and abuse must always be remembered".

=== Sylvia's Child Advocacy Center ===
Sylvia's Child Advocacy Center is a child advocacy organization officially dedicated to the memory of Sylvia Likens. Founded in 2010 in Lebanon, Indiana, and initially named the Boone County Child Advocacy Center, this non-profit organization was renamed in Likens's honor in 2016, with the executive director stating: "The most important thing that we can do is tell kids they are hurt and we are listening. [This was] something no one did for young Sylvia. Her family is thankful, though, it doesn't have to be that way anymore ... she did not die in vain; she died a horrific death, but because of that, we're hoping that another child can be saved."

This child advocacy center was formed with the objective to assist child victims of abuse and neglect, to minimize the ongoing traumatic effects experienced as a result of their ordeal, and to undertake a "relentless pursuit" to prevent child abuse in both Boone and Montgomery counties. Professionals at Sylvia's Child Advocacy Center work in concert with both law enforcement and the local Department of Child Services. Staff also conduct forensic interviews and provide assistance with legal procedures, as well as mental and medical health referrals.

== Media ==
=== Film ===
- The 2007 film An American Crime is directly based upon the life and murder of Sylvia Likens. Directed by Indiana native Tommy O'Haver and distributed by First Look Studios, the movie cast Elliot Page (then known as Ellen Page) as Sylvia Likens and Catherine Keener as Gertrude Baniszewski.
- The Girl Next Door is loosely based upon the murder of Sylvia Likens. Released in 2007 and starring Blythe Auffarth as Meg Loughlin, based on Likens, and Blanche Baker as Ruth Chandler, based on Baniszewski, The Girl Next Door is an adaptation of a 1989 horror novel penned by author Jack Ketchum.

=== Television ===
- The Investigation Discovery channel has commissioned a documentary focusing upon the abuse and murder of Sylvia Likens as part of its true-life crime documentary series Deadly Women. This 45-minute documentary, titled "Born Bad", was first broadcast on November 30, 2009.
- Sylvia; a 35-minute documentary directed by Ashton Gleckman. This documentary features interviews with several individuals who had either known Likens or were otherwise directly connected to the case. The documentary premiered in July 2026.

== See also ==
- Crime in Indiana
- Herd mentality – Tendency to adopt group beliefs and behaviors
- List of long-term false imprisonment cases
- List of murdered American children
- Psychological abuse – Mental or emotional harm inflicted on a person

== Cited works and further reading ==
- Ammeson, Jane Simon (2017). Murders that Made Headlines: Crimes of Indiana. Bloomington: Indiana University Press. ISBN 978-0-253-02983-6.
- Bowman, Forrest Jr. (2014). Sylvia: The Likens Trial. California: CreateSpace. ISBN 978-1-502-58263-8.
- Bodenhamer, David J.; Barrows, Robert G. (1994). The Encyclopedia of Indianapolis. Indiana: Indiana University Press. ISBN 0-253-31222-1.
- Davis, Carol Ann (2004). Children Who Kill: Profiles of Pre-Teen and Teenage Killers. London: Allison & Busby. ISBN 978-0-749-00693-8.
- Dean, John (1999). The Indiana Torture Slaying: Sylvia Likens's Ordeal and Death. Kentucky: Borf Books. ISBN 0-9604894-7-9.
- Dean, John (2008). House of Evil: The Indiana Torture Slaying. United States of America: St. Martin's Paperbacks. ISBN 978-0-312-94699-9.
- Flowers, R. Barri; Flowers, H. Loraine (2001). Murders in the United States: Crimes, Killers and Victims of the Twentieth Century. North Carolina: McFarland and Company. ISBN 0-7864-2075-8.
- Green, Ryan (2018). Torture Mom: A Chilling True Story of Confinement, Mutilation and Murder. Herefordshire, England: Self-published. ISBN 978-1-7209-7355-3. OCLC 1082265619.
- Hornberger, Francine (2002). Mistresses of Mayhem: The Book of Women Criminals. Indianapolis: Alpha. ISBN 978-0-739-42867-2.
- Ketchum, Jack (2005). The Girl Next Door. New York: Leisure Books. ISBN 978-0-843-95543-9.
- Knox, Sarah (1998). Murder: A Tale of Modern American Life. North Carolina: Duke University Press. ISBN 978-0-822-32053-1.
- Lief, Michael S.; Bycell, Ben; Caldwell, Mitchell (1998). Ladies And Gentlemen Of The Jury: Greatest Closing Arguments. New York: Simon & Schuster. ISBN 978-0-684-83661-4.
- Millett, Kate (1991). The Basement: Meditations on a Human Sacrifice. New York: Simon & Schuster. ISBN 978-0-671-72358-3.
- Nash, Jay Robert (1986). Look for the Woman: A Narrative Encyclopedia of Female Prisoners. United States: M. Evans Publishing. ISBN 978-1-461-74772-7.
- Nash, Jay Robert (1992). World Encyclopedia of 20th Century Murder. United States: M. Evans Publishing. ISBN 978-1-590-77532-5.
- Naso, Ronald C.; Mills, Jon (2016). Humanizing Evil: Psychoanalytic, Philosophical and Clinical Perspectives. New York: Routledge. ISBN 978-1-138-82853-7.
- Ritman, Kassie (2016). Boone County. South Carolina: Arcadia Publishing. ISBN 978-1-4671-1731-9.
- Stone, Michael (2009). The Anatomy of Evil. Prometheus Books. ISBN 978-1-591-02726-3.
- Waldfogel, Jane (2001). The Future of Child Protection: How to Break the Cycle of Abuse and Neglect. Massachusetts: Harvard University Press. ISBN 978-0-674-00723-9.
- Wilson, Colin (1985). Encyclopedia of Modern Murder: 1962–1982. United Kingdom: Bonanza Books. ISBN 978-0-517-66559-6.
- Wilson, Scott (2016). Resting Places: The Burial Sites of More Than 14,000 Famous Persons. North Carolina: McFarland & Company. ISBN 978-0-786-47992-4.
