= An American Crime =

2007 American crime horror film

- Theatrical release poster
- Directed by: Tommy O'Haver
- Written by: Tommy O'Haver; Irene Turner
- Produced by: Christine Vachon; Jocelyn Hayes; Henry Winterstern; Kevin Turen; Hans C. Ritter
- Starring: Elliot Page (Note: Credited as Ellen Page); Catherine Keener; Hayley McFarland; Ari Graynor; James Franco
- Cinematography: Byron Shah
- Edited by: Melissa Kent
- Music by: Alan Ari Lazar
- Production company: First Look
- Distributed by: Showtime
- Release dates: January 19, 2007 (Sundance Film Festival); May 10, 2008 (Showtime)
- Running time: 98 minutes
- Country: United States
- Language: English

An American Crime is a 2007 American crime drama film directed by Tommy O'Haver and starring Elliot Page and Catherine Keener. The film is based on the true story of the torture and murder of Sylvia Likens by Indianapolis single mother Gertrude Baniszewski. It premiered at the 2007 Sundance Film Festival.

Because of internal problems with the film's original distributor, First Look International, the film was not released theatrically. The Showtime television network officially premiered An American Crime on May 10, 2008. The film was nominated for a Golden Globe, a Primetime Emmy (both for Keener's performance), and a Writers Guild of America Award.

== Plot ==
In 1965, a pair of professional carnival workers named Lester and Betty Likens have two children, sixteen-year-old Sylvia Likens and Jennie, her disabled fifteen-year-old sister. Lester and Betty need to go on tour so they ask Gertrude Baniszewski to care for their children. Gertrude is a church acquaintance and the mother to Paula, Johnny, Stephanie, and several younger children. Although she is greatly impoverished, she agrees to take care of Sylvia and Jennie for a fee of $20.00 per week.

Shortly after the girls arrive, Gertrude becomes infuriated when Lester's weekly payment fails to arrive. Gertrude whips the sisters with a belt. Soon after, the payment arrives with a letter from Lester and Betty but Gertrude discards the letter without telling the sisters.

While out with friends, Sylvia tells Paula's boyfriend about Paula's pregnancy, a secret she swore not to tell, after she sees him beat her up. Paula becomes furious and tells Gertrude. Gertrude forces Sylvia to apologize for "spreading lies" and has her oldest son Johnny hold Sylvia down so Paula can beat her.

Jennie discovers the letter from their parents in the trash. Sylvia telephones them, but she is seen by the Baniszewski children. Gertrude falsely accuses them of stealing money from her for the call and burns Sylvia with a cigarette.

After a church lunch, Gertrude accuses Sylvia of flirting with Andy, father of one of Gertrude's sons. She sexually abuses Sylvia and has her imprisoned in the basement "until she learns her lesson".

Gertrude instructs her children to lie that Sylvia was sent to juvenile detention. With Gertrude's knowledge and approval, Johnny regularly invites the neighborhood children to the basement to abuse Sylvia. Soon, Paula feels guilty and tells her mother Sylvia has been punished enough. Gertrude ignores Paula, reminding her that there is blood on her hands as well.

Later, Paula confesses to her church pastor that she is pregnant. The pastor decides to visit the Baniszewski home. When he arrives, he suggests that Paula has confessed about her pregnancy and Sylvia's treatment. Gertrude lies that Sylvia was sent away for being a bad influence. Once the pastor leaves, Gertrude orders everyone into the basement. There she restrains Sylvia and begins branding the words "I'M A PROSTITUTE AND PROUD OF IT" on her stomach with a heated needle. When she is unable to finish she passes the needle to her teen neighbor Ricky Hobbs to finish the branding.

Late that night, Paula helps an injured Sylvia escape from the basement. During the escape, one of the Baniszewski sisters awakens Gertrude. She quickly tries to catch Sylvia before she can get into Ricky's car, but Paula stops her. Ricky drives Sylvia to the fair where her parents are working. They are horrified by Sylvia's condition and go to confront Gertrude and to see if Jennie is okay.

When Sylvia enters the house, she sees her own lifeless body on the floor. Stephanie and Ricky are trying to revive her, but to no avail. The entire escape and reunion with her parents was her final dream and she has succumbed to the torture and abuse, dying in the arms of Stephanie and Ricky.

Once the police arrive, Jennie agrees to testify in court in exchange for her freedom from the Baniszewskis' custody. At the murder trial, Jennie says Gertrude threatened her with the same treatment if she told anyone; Gertrude, being the final one called to testify, tries to frame her children and their friends for Sylvia's death. However, her attempts to frame all her witnesses backfire as she is sentenced to life in prison for first-degree murder and child abuse. Sylvia's voice narrates the fates of her other murderers. Gertrude, in her prison cell, briefly sees Sylvia's ghost. Sylvia later returns to her parents' carnival and rides the carousel, contemplating her fate but finally at peace.

== Cast ==
- Catherine Keener as Gertrude Baniszewski
- Elliot Page as Sylvia Likens
- James Franco as Andy Gordon
- Bradley Whitford as Prosecutor Leroy K. New
- Ari Graynor as Paula Baniszewski
- Nick Searcy as Lester Likens
- Michael O'Keefe as Reverend Bill Collier
- Romy Rosemont as Betty Likens
- Jeremy Sumpter as Coy Hubbard
- Evan Peters as Ricky Hobbs
- Hayley McFarland as Jenny Fay Likens
- Brian Geraghty as Bradley
- Michael Welch as Teddy Lewis
- Scott Reeves as Eric
- Scout Taylor-Compton as Stephanie Baniszewski
- Tristan Jarred as Johnny Baniszewski
- Hannah Leigh Dworkin as Shirley Baniszewski
- Carlie Westerman as Marie Baniszewski

== Production ==
Principal photography took place in 2006. Most of the cast were completely unaware of the real Likens murder until after they read the script, which was based largely on actual court transcripts from the case. Catherine Keener originally turned down the role of Gertrude Baniszewski; however, after she could not get the story out of her head, she met with director Tommy O'Haver and agreed to do the film. Elliot Page was the only choice to play Sylvia Likens.

== Critical reception ==
Review aggregator website Rotten Tomatoes reports that 43% of 14 critic reviews are positive for the film, with an average rating of 4.8/10. Ginia Bellafante of The New York Times called it "one of the best television movies to appear in years" and praised Keener's portrayal of Baniszewski.

== Accolades ==
- Emmy Awards
  - Outstanding Lead Actress In A Miniseries Or A Movie - Catherine Keener (nominated)
- Writers Guild of America Awards
  - Long Form — Original - Tommy O’Haver and Irene Turner (nominated)
- Golden Globe Awards
  - Best Actress in a Limited Series, Anthology Series, or Television Film - Catherine Keener (nominated)

== See also ==
- The Girl Next Door, another film loosely based on the Likens case, released in the same year.
