= Tommy O'Haver =

American film and television director

Tommy O'Haver (born October 24, 1968) is an American film director and screenwriter.

== Early life ==
O'Haver grew up in Carmel, Indiana, a suburb of Indianapolis. He graduated from Carmel High School and matriculated at Indiana University with a joint degree in Journalism and Comparative Literature.

In the mid-1990s, he attended the MFA Film program at the University of Southern California School of Cinematic Arts.

== Career ==
Billy's Hollywood Screen Kiss, featuring Sean Hayes, was O'Haver's feature film directorial debut. Billy's Hollywood Screen Kiss played in competition at the 1998 Sundance Film Festival, and received mostly positive reviews from critics.

His follow-up film, titled Get Over It, featured Kirsten Dunst, Ben Foster, Mila Kunis and Zoe Saldaña in a teen comedy about a school theater production; it was released in 2001, and received mixed reviews from critics. O'Haver's third film, Ella Enchanted, starred Anne Hathaway, was released in 2004, and also received mixed reviews from critics.

His fourth feature film, which was eventually released as a television film, starred Catherine Keener, Elliot Page, and James Franco; the film, titled An American Crime, premiered at Sundance in 2007, and was based on a true story of Gertrude Baniszewski, an Indiana woman charged in 1965 with the murder of Sylvia Likens. The initial reaction at Sundance was mixed, but the film later garnered some critical praise, with Ginia Bellafante of The New York Times called it "one of the best television movies to appear in years".

In June 2013, O'Haver directed the music video "Rollin'" for MiBBs.

On April 2, 2015, the seventh episode of The Late Late Show with James Corden was broadcast from O'Haver's house.

In 2017, O'Haver's fifth film, The Most Hated Woman in America, was released; it starred Melissa Leo as Madalyn Murray O'Hair, the founder of American Atheists. The film had its world premiere at South by Southwest on March 14, 2017. It was released on March 24, 2017, by Netflix. It received mostly negative reviews from critics.

== Filmography ==
| Year | Film | Credited as | | | | | Role, notes, references |
| Year | Film | Director | Writer | Producer | Actor | Other | Role, notes, references |
|---|---|---|---|---|---|---|---|
| 1998 | Billy's Hollywood Screen Kiss | Yes | Yes | | | Yes | Foley walker |
| 2001 | Get Over It | Yes | | | Yes | | Love Matters Director |
| 2004 | Ella Enchanted | Yes | | | Yes | | Squirrel-on-a-Stick Vendor |
| 2007 | An American Crime | Yes | Yes | | | | |
| 2007 | The Loop | Yes | | | | | Episode: "Stride" |
| 2009 | United States of Tara | Yes | | | | | Episode: "Possibility" |
| 2017 | The Most Hated Woman in America | Yes | Yes | Yes | | | |
| 2019 | 30/30 Vision: 3 Decades of Strand Releasing | Yes | Yes | | | | segment "One-Minute Musical" |
