= Daniel Manche =

American actor

Daniel Manche (born January 28, 1993) is an American actor, singer and music producer from Daphne, Alabama who moved to New York City, and lives in North Jersey. He portrayed the role of J.J. Snyder on the CBS soap opera As the World Turns before taking on the role of Tom on One Life to Live.

Manche was discovered by his manager, who eventually brought him to New York City to audition for the Broadway show Nine. He appeared in roles on Guiding Light, Law & Order: Criminal Intent, Law & Order: Special Victims Unit, and The Black Donnellys.

His film credits include Headspace and Jack Ketchum's The Girl Next Door, as well as Jug Face. He played Young Tarzan in the Broadway musical Tarzan, and appeared in Dr. Seuss' How the Grinch Stole Christmas!.

His family made headlines in 2006 when his parents (Dan and Dawn Manche) sued each other for custody of Daniel and his two sisters, Jade and Autumn.
