= Blythe Auffarth =

American actress (born 1985)

- Occupation: Actress
- Years active: 1999–present

Blythe Auffarth is an American actress, best known for starring in The Girl Next Door.

== Filmography ==
=== Film ===
Year	Title	Role	Notes
2017	Dear Sister	Mary	
2014	Dragon Nest: Warriors' Dawn	Liya, Kasarana	Voice
2010	An Invisible Sign	Nan	
2009	Wild About Harry	Eliza	
2007	The Girl Next Door	Meg Loughlin	Based on the novel and murder of Sylvia Likens.
2000	Keeping the Faith	Teenage Anna Riley	

=== Television ===
Year	Title	Role	Notes
2017	Hug it Out	Tara	1 episode
2017	Overdue	Celia Stephens	TV series
2016	Outcast	Addict	1 episode: "This Little Light"
2010	The Hard Times of RJ Berger	Mandy	1 episode: "Over the Rainbow"
2010	NCIS	Melanie	1 episode: "Mother's Day"
2008	The American Mall	Alexa	Made for TV movie.
2007	The Suite Life of Zack & Cody	Ellen	1 episode: "The First Day of High School"
2006	Law & Order: Criminal Intent	Nicole Johnson	1 episode: "Siren Call"
2006	The King of Queens	Gina	1 episode: "Fight Schlub"
2006	Veronica Mars	Betina Marone	1 episode: "I Am God"
2002	Law & Order	Maura Tinley	1 episode: "Girl Most Likely"
2001	Law & Order: Special Victims Unit	Amanda	1 episode: "Pixies"
2001	Law & Order: Special Victims Unit	Jody Ramsey	1 episode: "Repression"
2000	Sex and the City	Jenny's Friend - Blonde Girl #2	1 episode: "Hot Child in the City"
1999	Third Watch	Daughter	1 episode: "History of the World"

=== Video games ===
Year	Title	Role	Notes
2008	The Hardy Boys: The Hidden Theft	Lilly, Nancy Drew	
