= The Girl Next Door (2007 film) =

2007 film by Gregory M. Wilson

- Theatrical release poster
- Directed by: Gregory M. Wilson
- Screenplay by: Daniel Farrands; Philip Nutman
- Based on: The Girl Next Door by Jack Ketchum
- Produced by: William M. Miller; Andrew van den Houten
- Starring: Blanche Baker; Daniel Manche; Blythe Auffarth
- Narrated by: William Atherton
- Cinematography: William M. Miller
- Edited by: M.J. Fiore
- Music by: Ryan Shore
- Production companies: Modernciné; Modern Girl Productions
- Distributed by: Starz Home Entertainment
- Release date: October 3, 2007
- Running time: 91 minutes
- Country: United States
- Language: English

Jack Ketchum's The Girl Next Door (also known as Jack Ketchum's Evil) is a 2007 American psychological horror-thriller film directed by Gregory M. Wilson from a screenplay by Daniel Farrands and Philip Nutman. It is based on Jack Ketchum's 1989 novel of the same name, which was inspired by the real-life murder of Sylvia Likens, to whom the movie is dedicated.

== Plot ==
In 2007, David Moran witnesses a man hit and run by a car in New York City. He responds to the situation and tries to resuscitate the victim. That evening, he reflects on his past in the summer of 1958, when he meets his first teenage crush, Meg Loughlin. Meg and her disabled sister Susan have lost their parents in a car accident. They are sent to live with their aunt, Ruth Chandler, and her sons, Willie, Ralphie, and Donny.

Ruth freely allows her sons' young friends, including David, to her house, where she entertains them and offers them beer and cigarettes. Meanwhile, Ruth starves Meg, subjects her to misogynistic lectures, and accuses her of being a whore while her children listen. After an incident when Meg hits Ralphie when he inappropriately touches her, Ruth strips and spanks Susan for being a "conniver," forcing Meg to watch. Ruth then confiscates Meg's ring necklace that had belonged to her mother.

Meg reports the abuse to a local police officer named Lyle Jennings, but law enforcement does not criminally charge Ruth. As punishment, Ruth and her sons bind Meg in the basement and torment her, strip her, and then leave her overnight, hanging by the arms from the rafters. She eventually becomes dehydrated and is unable to even eat the dry toast Ruth tries to feed her. Ruth again spanks Susan as punishment on Meg's behalf.

With Ruth's approval, the neighborhood children visit the Chandler residence to tie, beat, burn and cut Meg for fun. Ruth cauterizes the wounds Meg receives with cigarettes. David tries to tell his parents but is unable to do so. Officer Jennings checks in once more, answering another call about Meg's abuse, but Ruth and her sons convince Officer Jennings that they were simply roughhousing. While they are distracted speaking to the officer, David loosens Meg's bindings and tells her to escape that night, even offering to leave money for her in the woods. Meg nearly escapes but is caught when she tries to take Susan with her.

David returns to the Chandler house and is guided to the basement, where Meg is being raped by Willie. Ruth then carves a sexually explicit message into Meg's abdomen with a heated bobby pin and burns her clitoris with a blowtorch. After that, Ruth and her sons taunt Meg, gloating about how no one can save her since she will die from her wounds escaping from their residence soon. David attempts to leave and get help, but the boys tie him up and kick him in the groin before turning their attention back to Meg.

Later in the day, David awakes still on the basement floor. He frees himself from his bindings and finds Susan sitting with an unconscious Meg. Susan reveals that she had confessed to Meg about Ruth molesting her, making Meg hesitant to escape alone. David plans their escape and lights a fire in the basement. As Ruth enters the basement to put out the fire, David beats her to death with Susan's crutch. Ruth's two remaining sons arrive in the basement, and Willie attempts to cut David’s throat with a knife before Officer Jennings intervenes and arrests the Chandler boys. The police take Susan from the basement so that she can testify in court, leaving Meg with David. David returns the ring necklace to Meg, who uses the last of her energy to thank David for what he has done and profess her love for him before finally dying from her injuries.

Back in 2007, the adult David reflects on how his past still haunts him. However, as Meg taught him, "It's what you do last that counts."

== Cast ==
- Daniel Manche as David Moran
  - William Atherton as Adult David Moran
- Blythe Auffarth as Meg Loughlin
- Blanche Baker as Ruth Chandler
- Madeline Taylor as Susan Loughlin
- Benjamin Ross Kaplan as Donny Chandler
- Graham Patrick Martin as Willie Chandler, Jr.
- Austin Williams as Ralphie Chandler
- Michael Nardella as Tony
- Kevin Chamberlin as Officer Lyle Jennings
- Dean Faulkenberry as Kenny
- Gabrielle Howarth as Cheryl Robinson
- Spenser Leigh as Denise Crocker
- Grant Show as Mr. Moran
- Catherine Mary Stewart as Mrs. Moran
- Michael Zegen as Eddie

Additionally, Mark Margolis appears in a brief role as the homeless man struck by a vehicle at the beginning of the film, while Peter Stickles portrays an EMT. William Atherton makes a cameo appearance as one of the grown up neighborhood boys.

== Production ==
In a 2007 interview, lead actress Blythe Auffarth described the physical and emotional challenges of filming the abuse scenes, particularly those in which her character is suspended and blindfolded. "It's extremely humiliating, and it's a little bit scary being so without control," she stated. "It's scary being helpless, and it's humiliating hanging and dangling there, and it's even more petrifying to have your senses taken away from you."

The film's original score was composed by Ryan Shore.

== Reception ==
On the review aggregator website Rotten Tomatoes, the film holds an approval rating of 67% based on 15 critic reviews, with an average rating of 6.1/10. On Metacritic, it has a weighted average score of 29 out of 100, based on 5 reviews, indicating "generally unfavorable reviews".

The New York Times' Neil Genzlinger expressed strong disapproval, describing it as "the kind of movie that makes you wish you could rinse your brain in bleach to wash all traces of it from your memory. Slant Magazine's Rob Humanick compared the film to "some demented cross between a Norman Rockwell painting and an Eli Roth film".

Author Stephen King praised the film as who called it "the first authentically shocking American film I've seen since Henry: Portrait of a Serial Killer (1986) over 20 years ago." King added, "If you are easily disturbed, you should not watch this movie. If, on the other hand, you are prepared for a long look into hell, suburban style, The Girl Next Door will not disappoint. This is the dark-side-of-the-moon version of Stand by Me (1986)".

== See also ==
- An American Crime: A film which leans more in the direction of a true crime portrayal of Likens's murder. This film was scheduled for release at roughly the same time, but was not released until a Showtime premiere on May 10, 2008.
