= Blanche Baker =

American actress (b. 1956)

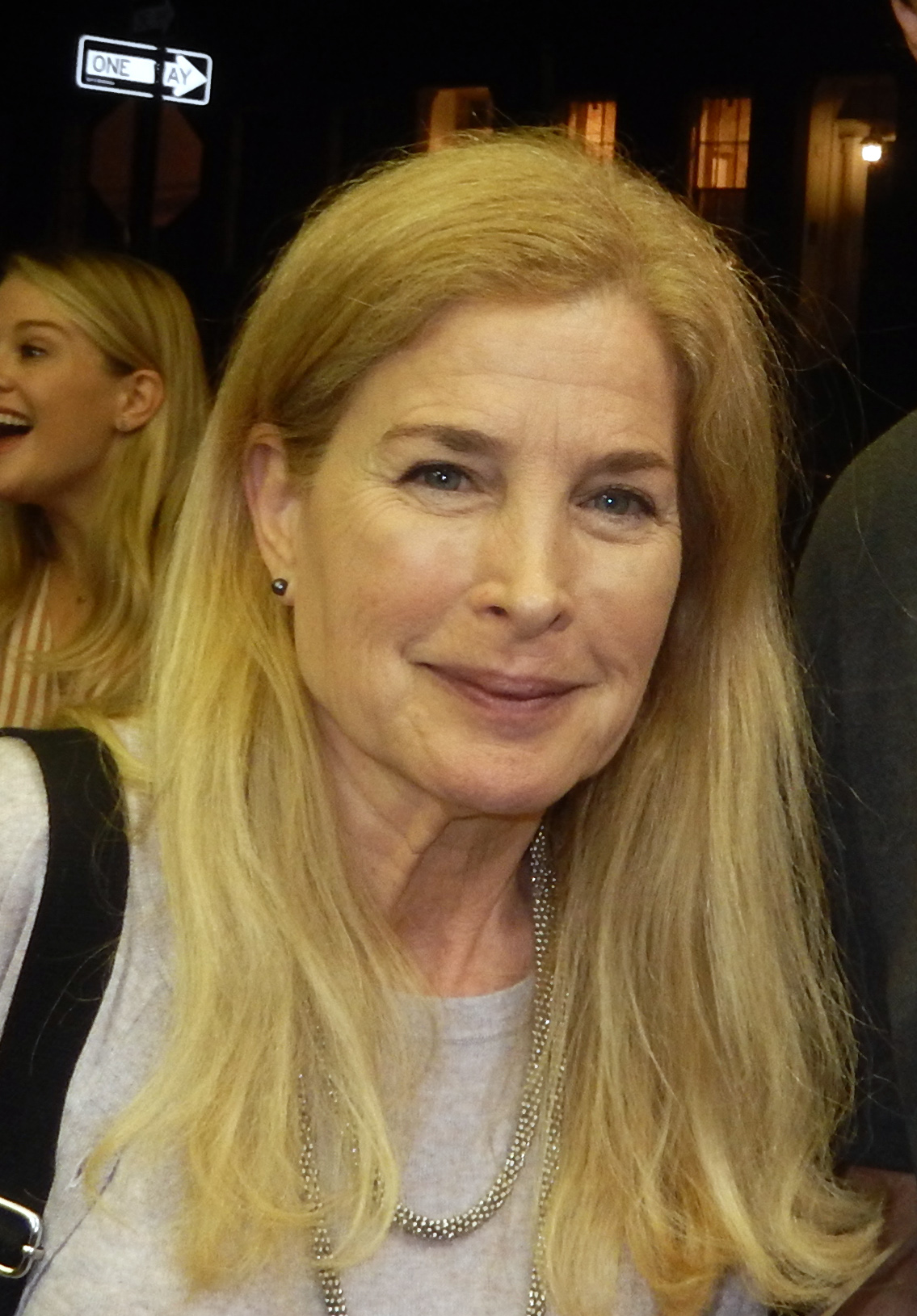
- Baker in 2019
- Born: Blanche Garfein; December 20, 1956 (age 69); New York City, New York, U.S.
- Education: Wellesley College; HB Studio; Lee Strasberg Institute
- Occupation: Actress
- Years active: 1978–present
- Spouses: Bruce Van Dusen (m. 1983; div. 2002) Mark Magill (m. 2003)
- Children: 4
- Parent(s): Carroll Baker (mother); Jack Garfein (father)
- Relatives: Herschel Garfein (brother)
- Website: blanchebaker.com

Blanche Baker (née Garfein; born December 20, 1956) is an American actress. She won a Primetime Emmy Award for Outstanding Single Performance by a Supporting Actress for her work in the television miniseries Holocaust (1978). She also starred as the titular character in the Broadway play Lolita (1981).

== Early life and education ==
Born Blanche Garfein in New York City, she is the daughter of actress Carroll Baker and director Jack Garfein. Her father was Jewish and from Carpathian Ruthenia (born in Mukachevo), who survived the Holocaust; and her mother was a Roman Catholic who converted to Judaism. She also has a younger brother, Herschel Garfein. Her parents divorced when she was 12-years-old.

She spent her early life in Italy, where her mother had established a film career after leaving Hollywood in the mid-1960s. Baker attended the American Overseas School of Rome and then Wellesley College from 1974 to 1976. She later studied acting at the Herbert Berghof Studio and the Lee Strasberg Theatre Institute.

== Career ==
=== Television ===
Blanche Baker made her television debut playing the character Anna Weiss in the miniseries Holocaust. (Her father Jack Garfein had been imprisoned in Auschwitz.) She won the Primetime Emmy Award for Outstanding Single Performance by a Supporting Actress in 1978 for her performance.

She has subsequently appeared in the TV movies Mary and Joseph: A Story of Faith (1979) as Mary, The Day the Bubble Burst (1982), The Awakening of Candra (1983) as Candra Torres, Embassy (1985), Nobody's Child (1986), and Taking Chance (2009). She also has appeared in many TV series.

=== Theatre ===
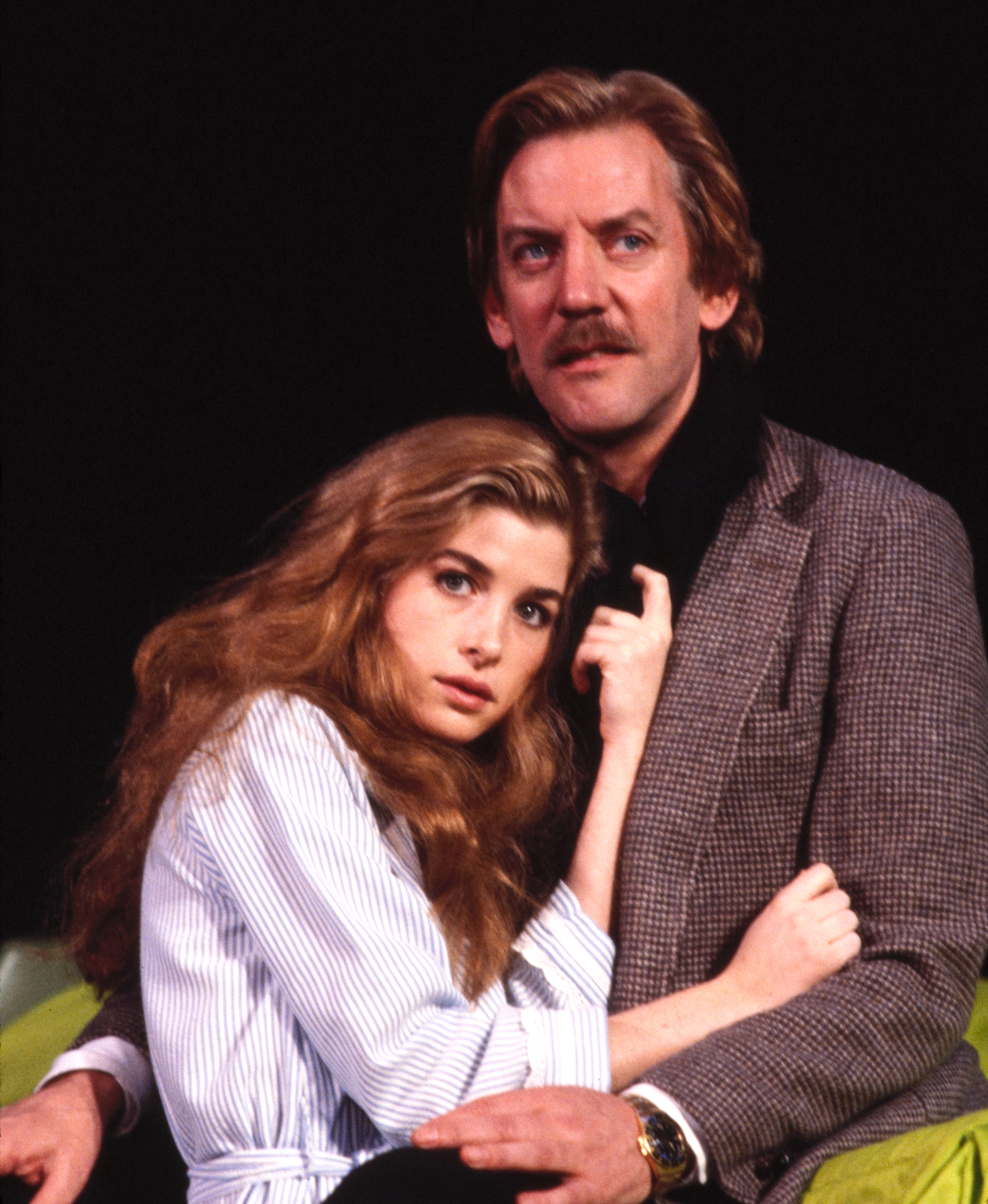
With Donald Sutherland in Lolita rehearsal, New York City

In 1980–81, she originated the lead role in Edward Albee's stage adaptation of Vladimir Nabokov's novel Lolita. During out-of-town tryouts and in New York, the play was picketed by feminists, including Women Against Pornography, who were outraged by the theme of pedophilia.

The troubled production opened on Broadway on March 19, 1981, after 31 previews and closed after only 12 performances. Frank Rich of The New York Times gave the play a bad review, terming it "the kind of embarrassment that audiences do not quickly forget or forgive." Baker was mentioned by Rich in only one line. "In the title role, here a minor figure, the 24-year-old Miss Baker does a clever job of impersonating the downy nymphet; she deserves a more substantial stage vehicle soon."

People Magazine called Albee's Lolita "Broadway's Bomb of the Year" in an April 16, 1981, story. Baker was the real subject of the article, and People writer Mark Donovan said "the critics were almost unanimous on one point: Blanche Baker was an ingenue whose time had come," citing reviews of critics that had called her "breathtaking" and "beguiling."

Baker originated the role of Shelby in the first production of Steel Magnolias Off-Broadway in 1987.

=== Film ===
Baker made her movie debut in the political drama The Seduction of Joe Tynan (1979). Other film appearances include Sixteen Candles (1984), Cold Feet (1984), Taking Chance (2009) and The Girl Next Door (2007).

== Teaching ==
Baker is a Senior Faculty at the New York Film Academy, where she teaches in both the Acting and Musical Theatre Departments.

== Personal life ==
Baker married director Bruce vanDusen on October 1, 1983. They had three children before divorcing in 2002. She remarried in 2003, to Mark McGill. They have one son.

== Filmography ==
=== Film ===
| Year | Title | Role | Notes |
|---|---|---|---|
| 1979 | French Postcards | Laura | |
| 1979 | The Seduction of Joe Tynan | Janet | |
| 1982 | The Tragedy of Romeo and Juliet | Juliet | |
| 1983 | Cold Feet | Leslie Christo | |
| 1984 | Sixteen Candles | Ginny Baker | |
| 1986 | Raw Deal | Amy Kaminski | |
| 1988 | Shakedown | Gail Feinberger | |
| 1988 | Bum Rap | Lisa DuSoir | |
| 1990 | The Handmaid's Tale | Ofglen | |
| 1991 | Livin' Large | Kate Penndragin | |
| 1994 | Dead Funny | Barbara | |
| 2006 | Underdogs | Marie | |
| 2006 | The Rehearsal | Marie | Short film |
| 2007 | The Girl Next Door | Ruth Chandler | |
| 2008 | 3rd of July | Mrs. Shaw | Short film |
| 2008 | Jersey Justice | Polly O'Bannon | |
| 2009 | Science Fair (Or: Migratory Patterns & the Flight of the March Brown Mayfly) | Mom | Short film |
| 2009 | Jackrabbit Sky | Evelyn Boden | |
| 2010 | An Affirmative Act | Lori Belmont | |
| 2010 | Three Chris's | Dolores Kelly | |
| 2011 | Fake | Mrs. Needham | |
| 2011 | The Grand Theft | Barbara Blushe | |
| 2011 | The Life Zone | Dr. Victoria Wise | |
| 2011 | Whisper Me a Lullaby | Aunt Jane | |
| 2011 | Untitled Folder | Mom | Short film |
| 2011 | Hell Grace | Mother | Short film |
| 2012 | Hypothermia | Hellen Pelletier | |
| 2012 | Ruth Madoff Occupies Wall Street | Ruth Madoff | Short film |
| 2012 | The Coffee Klash | Gayle | Short film |
| 2012 | Curiosity Killed the Cat | Gayle | |
| 2013 | Truth | Dr. Carter Moore | |
| 2013 | Classless | Principle Saunders | Short film |
| 2013 | Scallywag | Mom | Short film |
| 2014 | Deep in the Darkness | Zellis | |
| 2014 | The Coffee Shop | Gayle | |
| 2014 | Lady Peacock | Angie | |
| 2015 | Chasing Yesterday | Linda | |
| 2017 | Coin Heist | Mrs. Cunningham | |
| 2017 | Splitting Image | Karen | |
| 2018 | My Daughter Vanished | Helen | |
| 2019 | Zoe | Zoe's Mother | Short film |
| 2021 | Alice Fades Away | Roxy | |
| 2023 | Perception | Margaret | Short film |

==== As director ====
- 2017 - Streetwrite
- 2019 - Make America Safe

=== Television ===
| Year | Title | Role | Notes |
|---|---|---|---|
| 1978 | Holocaust | Anna Weiss | Miniseries |
| 1979 | Mary and Joseph: A Story of Faith | Mary | Television film |
| 1981 | The Awakening of Candra | Candra Torres | Television film |
| 1982 | The Day the Bubble Burst | Joan Slezsak | Television film |
| 1985 | The Equalizer | Allison Webster | Episode: "Desperately" |
| 1985 | Embassy | Megan Hillyer | Television film |
| 1986 | Nobody's Child | Shari | Television film |
| 1987 | Spenser: For Hire | Carolyn Tomlinson | Episode: "Personal Demons" |
| 1991 | The Trials of Rosie O'Neill | Unknown | Episode: "Domestic Silence" |
| 1991 | Davis Rules | Cindy | Episode: "Everybody Comes to Nick's" |
| 1992 | In the Heat of the Night | Jenny Sawyer | Episode: "Love, Honor & Obey" |
| 1992 | Law & Order | Lucy Neven | Episode: "Star Struck" |
| 1994 | Clarissa Explains It All | Chelsea Chipley | Episode: "Janet and Clarissa, Inc." |
| 2005 | Law & Order: Criminal Intent | Miriam Engles | Episode: "Diamond Dogs" |
| 2009 | Taking Chance | Chris Phelps | Television film |
| 2013 | The Chris Gethard Show | Herself | Episode: "#119: Scare the Shit Out of Bethany" |
| 2014 | Wishin' and Hopin' | Sister Filomena | Television film |

== Awards and nominations ==
| Institution | Year | Category | Work | Result |
|---|---|---|---|---|
| Atlantic City Cinefest | 2013 | Best Actress | Jersey Justice | Won |
| Atlantic City Cinefest | 2016 | Lifetime Achievement Award | —N/a | Won |
| Hoboken International Film Festival | 2010 | Best Actress | Jersey Justice | Nominated |
| Fright Meter Awards | 2007 | Best Actress | The Girl Next Door | Nominated |
| Primetime Emmy Awards | 1978 | Outstanding Guest Actress in a Drama Series | Holocaust | Won |
