= Semigallians =

Baltic tribe

Semigallians (Latvian: Zemgaļi; Lithuanian: Žiemgaliai; also Zemgalians, Semigalls or Semigalians) were the Baltic tribe that lived in the south central part of contemporary Latvia and northern Lithuania. They are noted for their long resistance (1219–1290) against the German crusaders and Teutonic Knights during the Northern Crusades. Semigallians had close linguistic and cultural ties with Samogitians.

== Name ==
The name of Semigallia appears in contemporary records as Seimgala, Zimgola and Sem[e]gallen. The -gal[l] element means "border", while the first syllable corresponds to ziem ("north") or zem ("low"). So the Semigallians were the "people of the northern borderlands" or "people of the low borderlands", i.e. the lower parts of the Mūša and Lielupe river valleys.

== History ==
During the Viking Age, the Semigallians were involved in battles with Swedish Vikings over control of the lower part of the Daugava waterway. In Gesta Danorum, the Danish chronicler Saxo Grammaticus wrote that the Viking Starkad crushed the Curonians, all the tribes of Estonia, and the peoples of Semgala. When the Rurikid successors of the Varangians tried to subjugate the Semigallians, the latter defeated the invading army of Polotsk led by Prince Rogvolod Vseslavich in 1106. Russian chronicles claim that 9,000 Russian soldiers were killed.

At the start of German conquests, Semigallian lands were divided in Upmale, Dobele, Spārnene, Dobe, Rakte, Silene and Tērvete chieftaincies.

According to the Livonian Chronicle of Henry, Semigallians formed an alliance with bishop Albert of Riga against rebellious Livonians before 1203, and received military support to hold back Lithuanian attacks in 1205. In 1207, the Semigallian duke Viestards (Latin: dux Semigallorum) helped the christened Livonian chief Caupo conquer back his Turaida castle from pagan rebels.

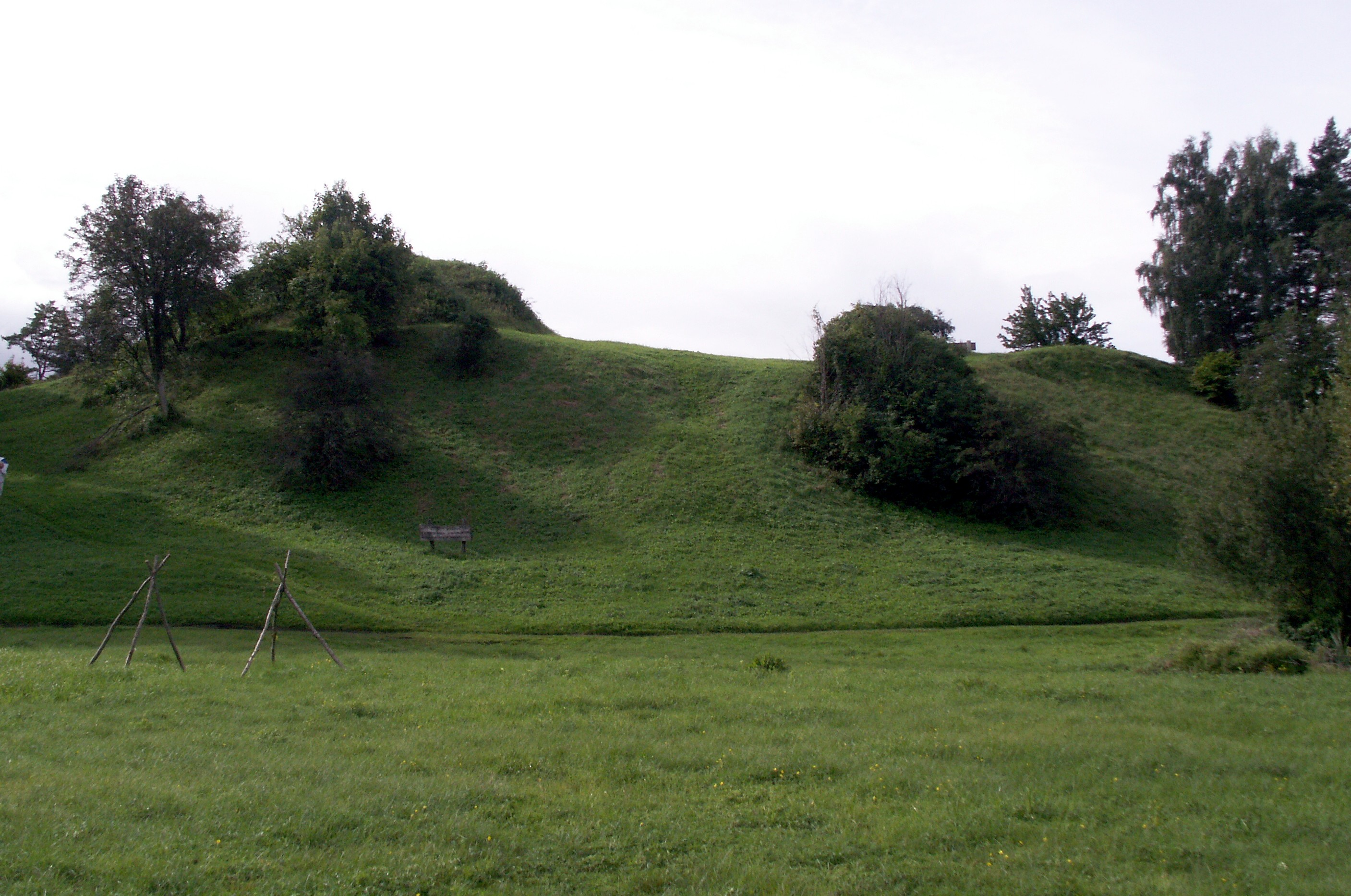
Tērvete hillfort, main Semigallian centre in 13th. century.

In 1219, the Semigallian-German alliance was canceled after a crusader invasion in Semigallia. Duke Viestards promptly formed an alliance with Lithuanians and Curonians. In 1228, Semigallians and Curonians attacked the Daugavgrīva monastery, the main crusader stronghold at the Daugava river delta. The crusaders took revenge and invaded Semigallia. The Semigallians, in turn, pillaged land around the Aizkraukle hillfort. In 1236, Semigallians attacked crusaders retreating to Riga after the Battle of Saule, killing many of them. After regular attacks, the Livonian Order partly subdued the Semigallians in 1254.

In 1270, the Lithuanian Grand Duke Traidenis, together with Semigallians, attacked Livonia and Saaremaa. During the Battle of Karuse on the frozen gulf of Riga, the Livonian Order was defeated, and its master Otto von Lutterberg killed. In 1287, around 1400 Semigallians attacked a crusader stronghold in Ikšķile and plundered nearby lands. As they returned to Semigallia they were caught by the Order's forces, and the great battle began near the Garoza river (Battle of Garoza). The crusader forces were besieged and badly defeated. More than 40 knights were killed, including the master of the Livonian Order Willekin von Endorp, and an unknown number of crusader allies. It was the last Semigallian victory over the growing forces of the Livonian Order.

In 1279, after the Battle of Aizkraukle, Grand Duke Traidenis of Lithuania supported a Semigallian revolt against the Livonian Order led by Duke Nameisis. In the 1280s, the Livonian Order started a massive campaign against the Semigallians, by burning their fields and thus causing a famine. The Semigallians continued their resistance until 1290, when they burned their last castle in Sidrabene, and a large number of Semigallians – the Rhymed Chronicle claims 100,000 – migrated to Lithuania and once there continued to fight against the Germans.

=== Semigallian archaeological sites in Latvia ===
Bauska district Čapāni, Drenģeri-Čunkāni, Dumpji, Jumpravmuiža, Lielbertuši, Mežotne hillfort, Podiņi, Siliņi, Zeltiņi, Ziedoņskola

Dobele district Atvases, Auce, Bāļas-Šķērstaiņi, Cibēni, Dobele hillfort, Gailīši, Grīnerti, Guntiņas, Īles mežniecība, Jāņogānas, Kaijukrogs, Ķūri, Lielogļi, Lozberģi, Oši, Skare, Tērvete hillfort

Jelgava district Ciemalde, Diduļi, Eži, Gaideļi-Viduči, Kakužēni, Kalnaplāteri, Kraujas, Ķēķi, Mazgrauži, Pudžas, Rijnieki, Vilces parks

Saldus district Griezes dzirnavas, Kerkliņi, Priedīši, Rūsīši-Debeši

Tukums district Mutstrauti, Zante

Riga district Pļavniekkalns

=== Semigallian archaeological sites in Lithuania ===
Pasvalys district Ąžuolpamūšė hillfort, Berklainiai, Daujėnai, Kyburtai, Meldiniai, Noriai, Pamiškiai, Pamūšė, Skrebotiškis, Smilgeliai, Šakarniai, Vaidžiūnai

Akmenė district Balsiai, Papilė hillfort, Pavirvytė-Gudai, Šapnagiai, Viekšniai

Joniškis district Budraičiai, Daugalaičiai, Daunorava, Dvareliškiai, Ivoškiai, Jauneikiai, Joniškis, Kalnelis hillfort (Sidabrė hillfort), Lieporai, Linkaičiai, Linksmėnai, Martyniškiai, Rudiškiai, Rukuižiai, Slėpsniai, Spirakiai, Stungiai, Žagarė (Raktuvė hillfort)

Pakruojis district Aukštadvaris, Dargužiai, Degesiai, Diržiai, Dovainiškis, Karašilis, Karpiškiai, Kauksnujai, Lauksodis, Liesai, Linkavičiai, Linksmučiai, Linkuva, Pakruojis, Paliečiai, Pamūšis, Pašvitinys, Peleniškiai, Petroniai, Plaučiškai, Sakališkiai, Stačiūnai, Šukioniai, Vėbariai, Žeimelis

Šiauliai district Daugėlaičiai, Gibaičiai, Jakštaičiai, Jurgaičiai hillfort (Hill of Crosses), Kaupriai, Kybartiškė, Mažeikiai, Norušaičiai, Norvaišiai, Račiai, Ringuvėnai, Valdomai, Visdergiai

== Notable leaders ==
There is an unconfirmed theory that the Semigallians were one of the first Baltic tribes to establish a monarchy, yet one weak in comparison to the power of the Semigallian nobles.

One of the most notable Semigallian leaders was duke Viestards (Viesturs). Upon uniting hostile Semigallian clans into a single state in the early 13th century, Viestards formed an alliance with the German crusaders to defeat his enemies on the outside. After the crusaders broke the treaty and invaded his lands, he allied with Lithuanians, resulting in the near annihilation of the Livonian Brothers of the Sword in the Battle of Saule in 1236.

The Semigallians in the context of the other Baltic tribes, c. 1200. The Eastern Balts are shown in brown hues while the Western Balts are shown in green. The boundaries are approximate.

Duke Nameisis (Namejs, Nameitis), another renowned Semigallian leader, united Semigallian and Lithuanian tribes for a retaliatory counterattack on Teutonic Knights at Riga in 1279 and in Prussia after 1281. Main sources for his activities are Livländische Reimchronik and Das Zeugenverhör des Franciscus de Moliano (1312). What is known with certainty, however, is that by the end of the 1270s, a new powerful leader had emerged who achieved several major victories over German crusaders in Zemgale and East Prussia.
