= Peace Pagoda =

Buddhist stupa; a monument to inspire peace

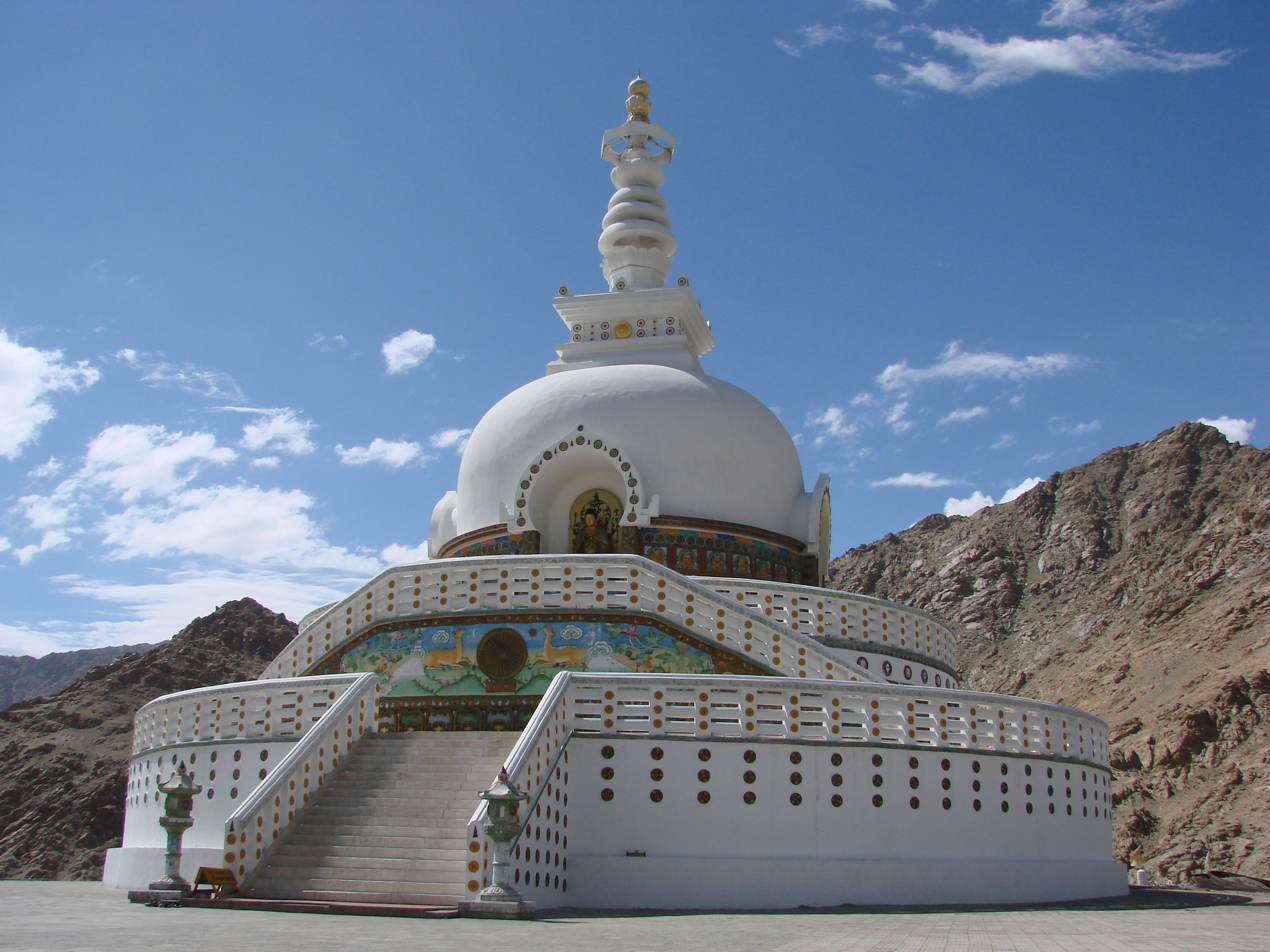
Shanti Stupa, Ladakh, India.

A Peace Pagoda is a Buddhist stupa: a monument to inspire peace, designed to provide a focus for people of all races and creeds, and to help unite them in their search for world peace. Most, though not all, peace pagodas built since World War II have been built under the guidance of Nichidatsu Fujii (1885–1985), a Buddhist monk from Japan and founder of the Nipponzan-Myōhōji Buddhist Order. Fujii was greatly inspired by his meeting with Mahatma Gandhi in 1931 and decided to devote his life to promoting non-violence. In 1947, he began constructing Peace Pagodas as shrines to world peace. The first was inaugurated at Kumamoto in 1954.

Peace Pagodas were built as a symbol of peace in Japanese cities, including Hiroshima and Nagasaki where atomic bombs took the lives of over 150,000 people, almost all of whom were civilian, at the end of World War II. By 2000, eighty Peace Pagodas had been built around the world in Europe, Asia, and the United States.

== Asia ==
=== Bangladesh ===
==== Comilla ====
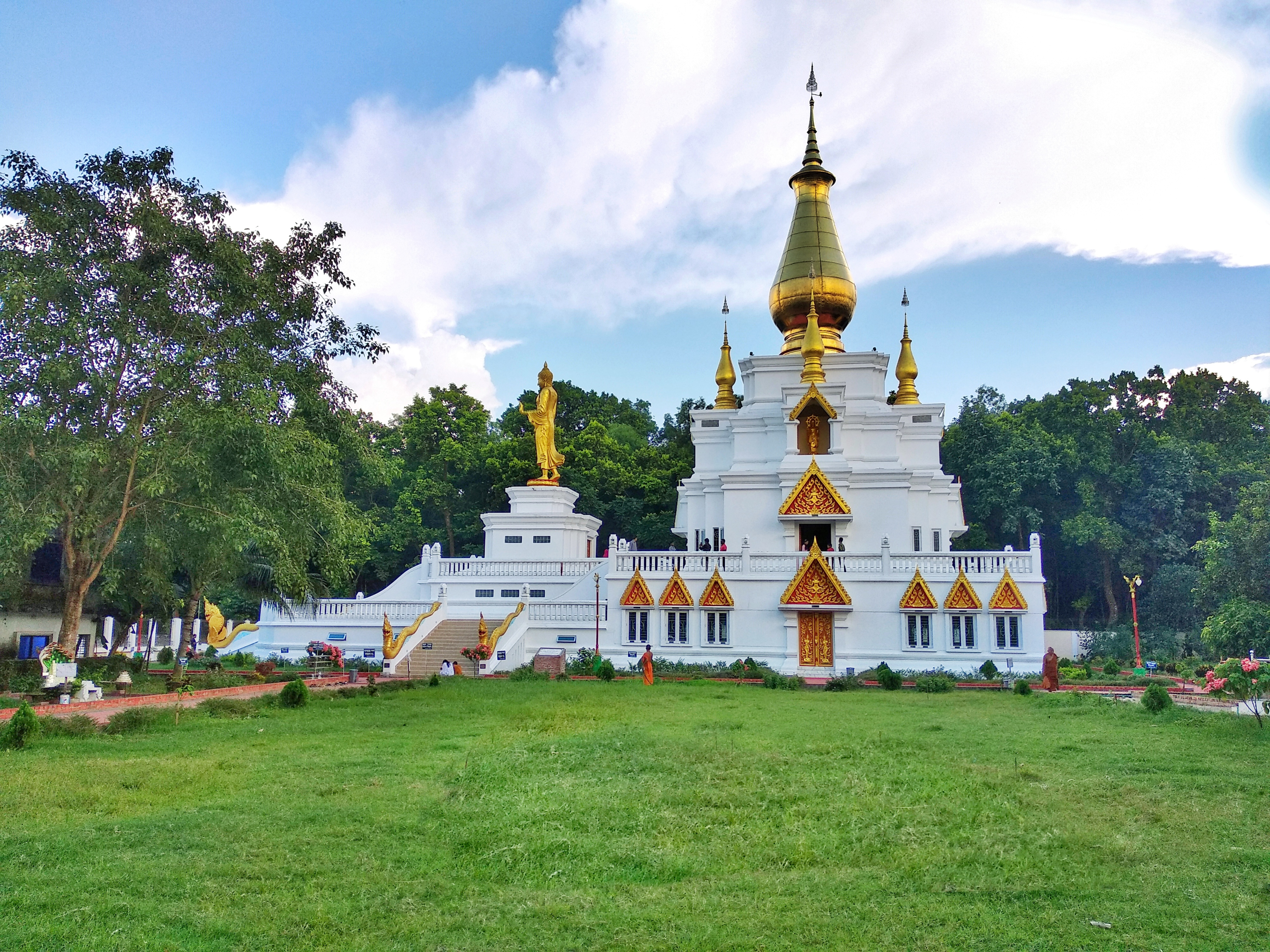
World Peace Pagoda Analayo in Comilla

World Peace Pagoda Analayo (23.425505°N 91.134444°E) is located at the premises of New Salban Vihara, Comilla. It is the first Thai architecture Pagoda in Bangladesh and which was designed by Thai architect. The 100 feet tall Pagoda is rich in Thai artistic beauty both inside and outside. A 30 feet Standing Buddha image installed in front of the pagoda is a symbol of compassion and kindness. It is inaugurated in 2017. Founder: Venerable Sugato Bhikkhu by the support of his spiritual teacher Most Venerable Phrathep Mongkolyarn chief abbot of Wat Phutthabucha, Bangkok, Thailand with his Thai devotees.

=== India ===
==== Rajgir ====
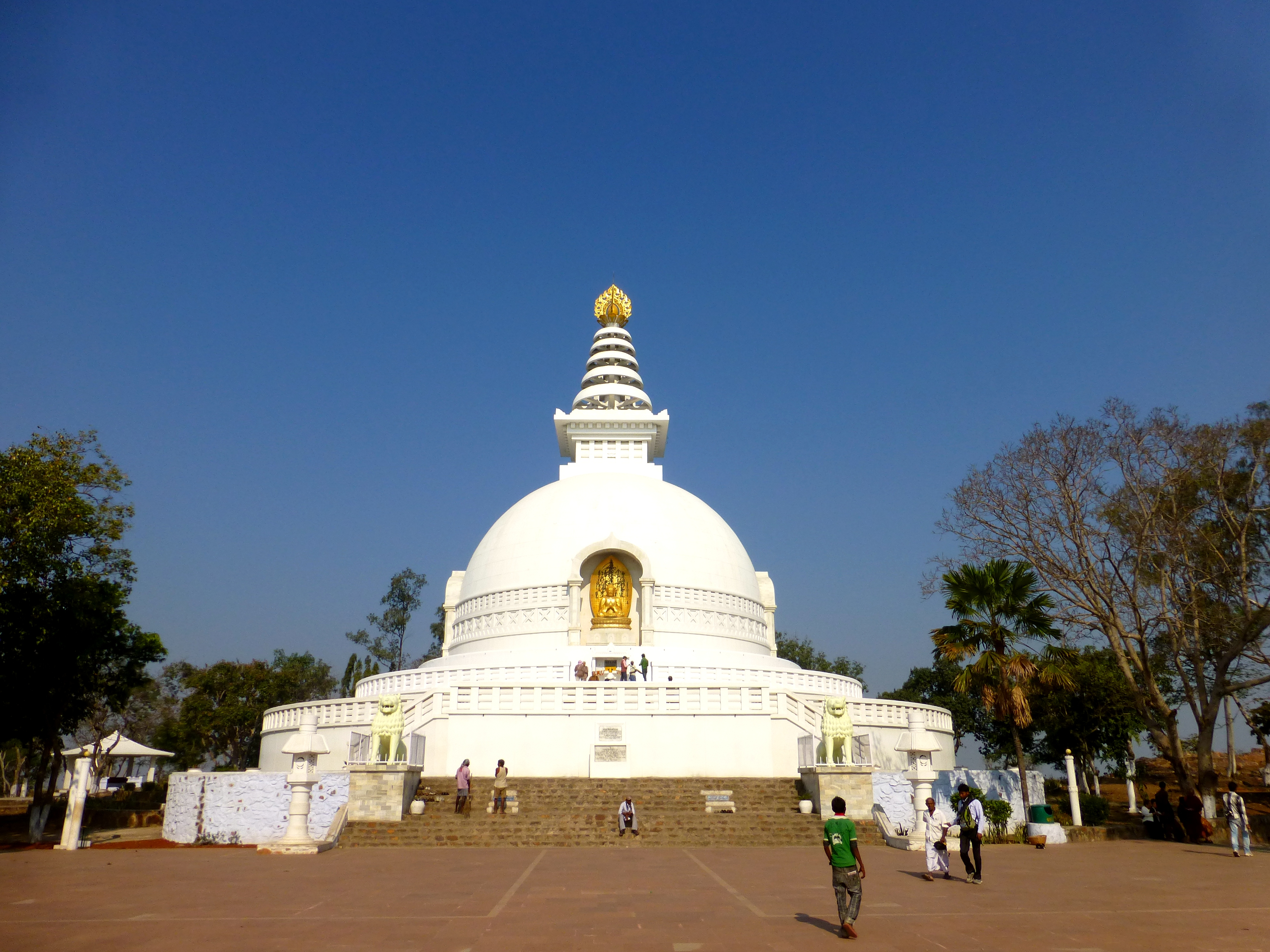
Shanti Stupa (Peace Pagoda) at Rajgir.

The Rajgir Vishwa Shanti Stupa/World Peace Pagoda (25.004553°N 85.444539°E) was completed in 1969 at Rajgir Hills near Rajgir, near the Vulture's Peak where the Buddha is believed to have preached the Lotus Sutra. The dedication coincided with the 100th anniversary of the birth of Mahatma Gandhi. The site also includes a Nipponzan Myohoji temple.

==== Darjeeling ====
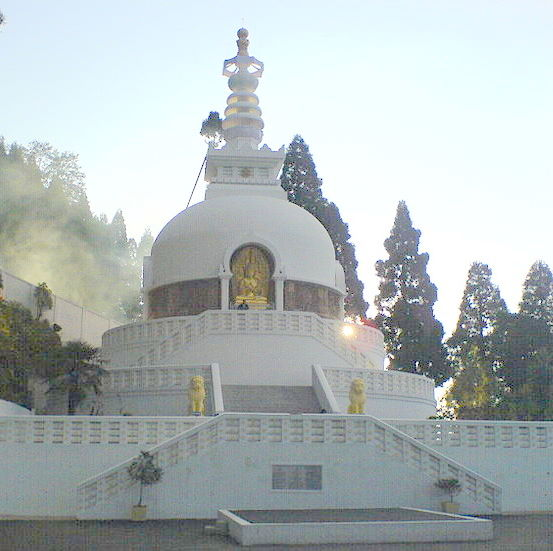
Japanese Peace Pagoda in Darjeeling

The shanthi stupas in India were established by Fuji Guru for World Peace. The Nipponzan Myōhōji Buddhist temple at Charlimont in Darjeeling (27.027585°N 88.259012°E) is one of them. Work on the Stupa began in 1972 and it was dedicated on 1 November 1992.

==== Delhi ====
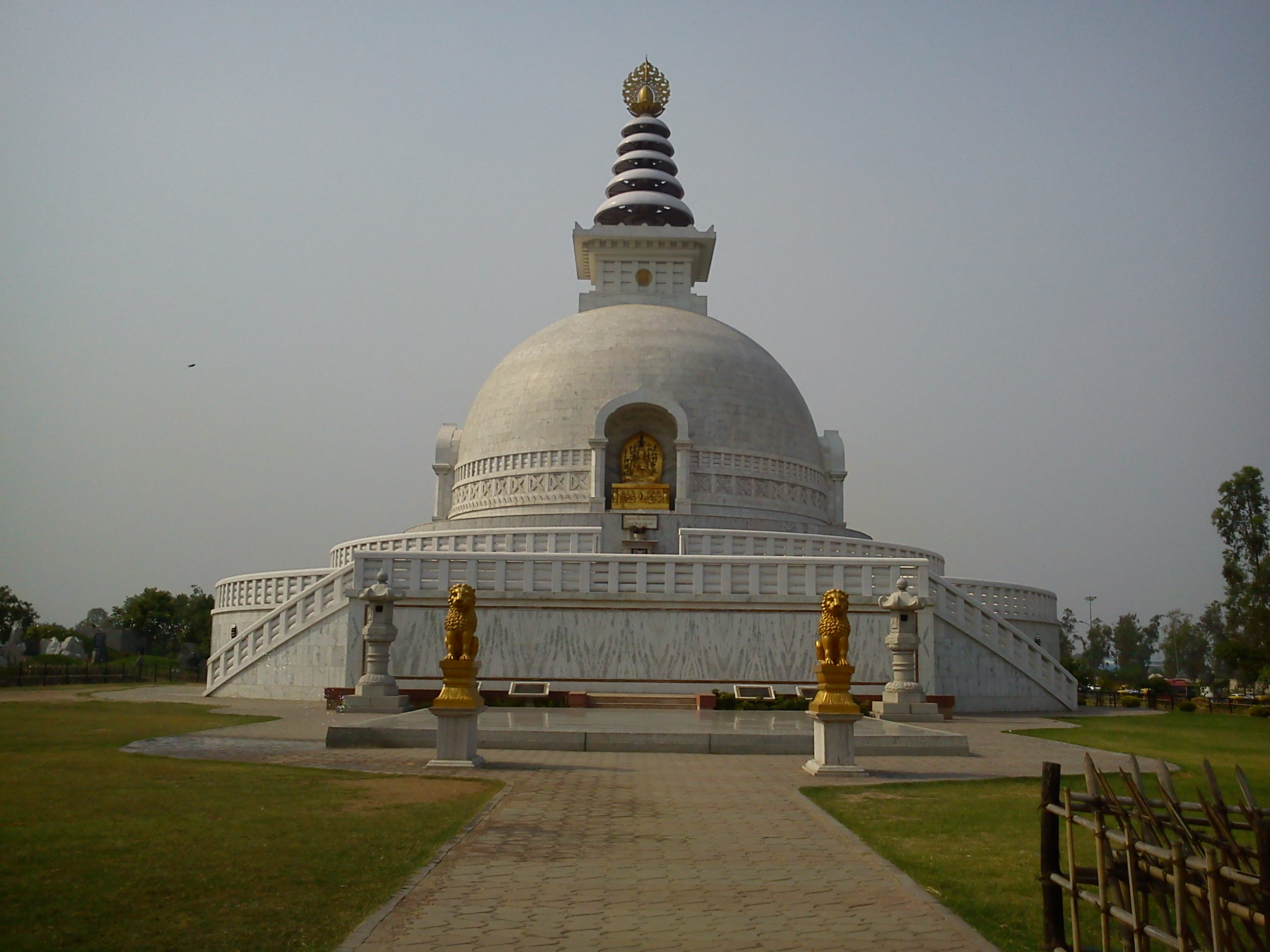
Vishwa Shanti Stupa (World Peace Pagoda), Delhi.

A Vishwa Shanti Stupa/World Peace Pagoda in New Delhi (28.602352°N 77.253413°E) was inaugurated on 20 November 2007 by monks and nuns of Nipponzan-Myōhōji, the Dalai Lama and the Lt. Governor of Delhi. It is situated in Millennium Indraprastha Park, North-East of Humayun's Tomb, adjacent to Delhi Ring Road.

A traditional Japanese garden has been constructed in the area around the stupa. The garden is a joint project by the Fujii Guruji Vishwa Shanti Stupa Committee and the Delhi Development Authority.

==== Dhauli Giri, Bhubaneswar, Orissa ====
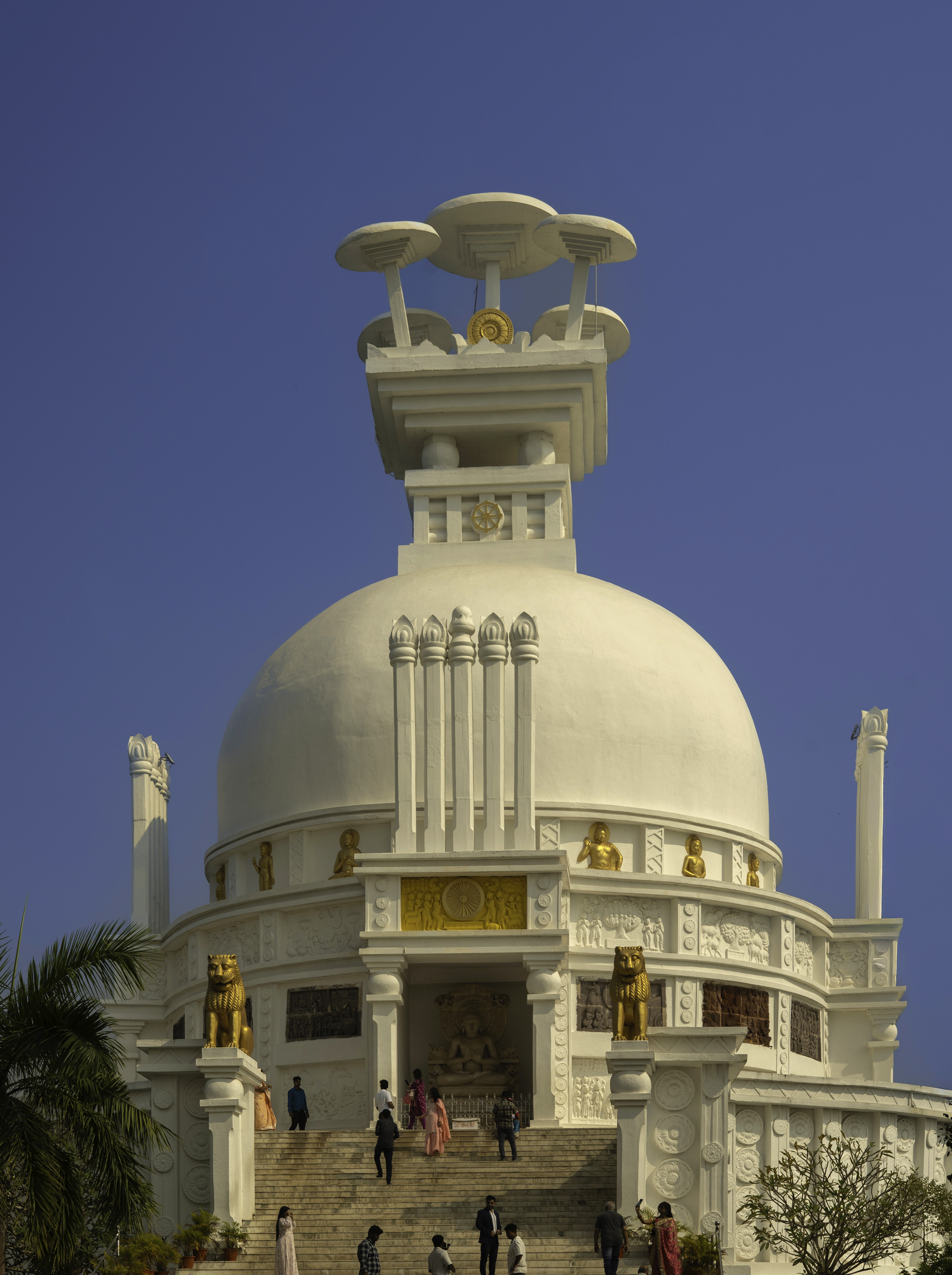
Dhauli Giri Shanti Stupa

The Dhauli Giri Shanti Stupa (Peace Pagoda) was built in Bhubaneswar, Orissa State (20.192392°N 85.839454°E) during a two-year period, and was inaugurated on 8 November 1972. It was established by Sri Nitya Nanda Kanungo, Governor of Bihar, with the spiritual guidance of Nichidatsu Fujii, whose monks helped build the Peace Pagoda.

==== Ladakh ====
The Shanti Stupa in Ladakh was built by Nipponzan-Myōhōji monks, headed by Head monk Nakamura, with the help of local people. The Shanti Stupa holds the relics of the Buddha at its base, enshrined by the 14th Dalai Lama himself It is situated at a hilltop in Changspa village providing a bird's eye view of Leh town and the surrounding mountain peaks. The 14th and current Dalai Lama inaugurated the Shanti Stupa in August 1985.

==== Vaishali ====
The stupa at Vaishali was inaugurated 23 October 1996. Vaishali is an important place in the life of the Buddha.

==== Wardha ====
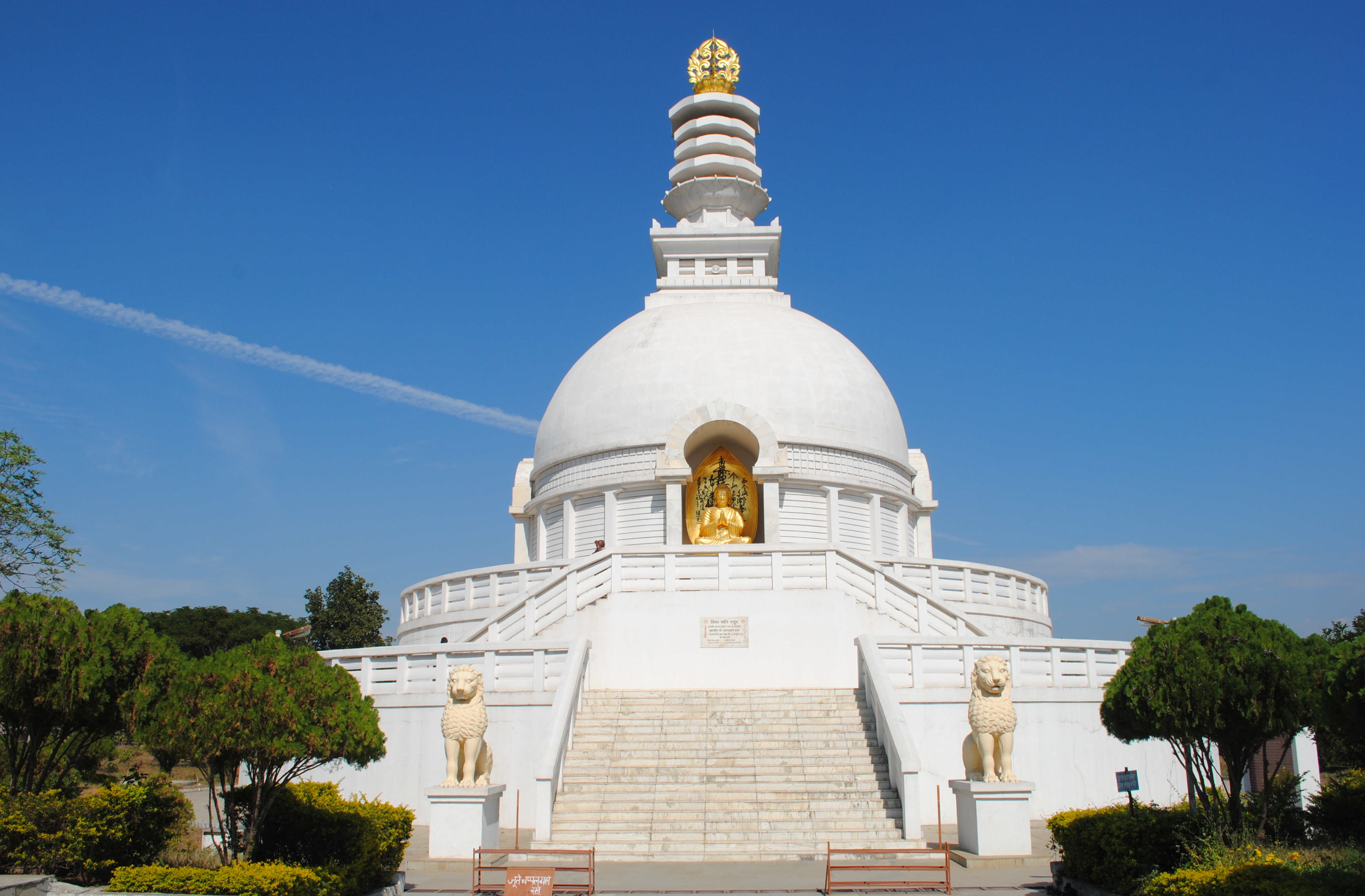
Viswa Shanti stupa at Wardha

Vishwa Shanti stupa was a dream of Nichidatsu Fujii. It is beside Gitai Mandir. It is a large stupa of white color. Statues of Buddha are mounted on the stupa, facing in four directions. It also has a small Japanese Buddhist temple with a large park. There is a temple near the stupa where prayers are done for universal peace.

=== Japan ===
==== Kumamoto ====
Work on Hanaokayama Peace Pagoda, the first Peace Pagoda constructed by Nipponzan Myohoji Japanese Buddhist monks, began in 1947 atop Mount Hanaoka, Kumamoto (32.796605°N 130.685959°E) with basic hand tools. It took seven years to build, being inaugurated in 1954: it was the first of over 80 built by Fujii and his followers all over the world.

==== Hiroshima ====
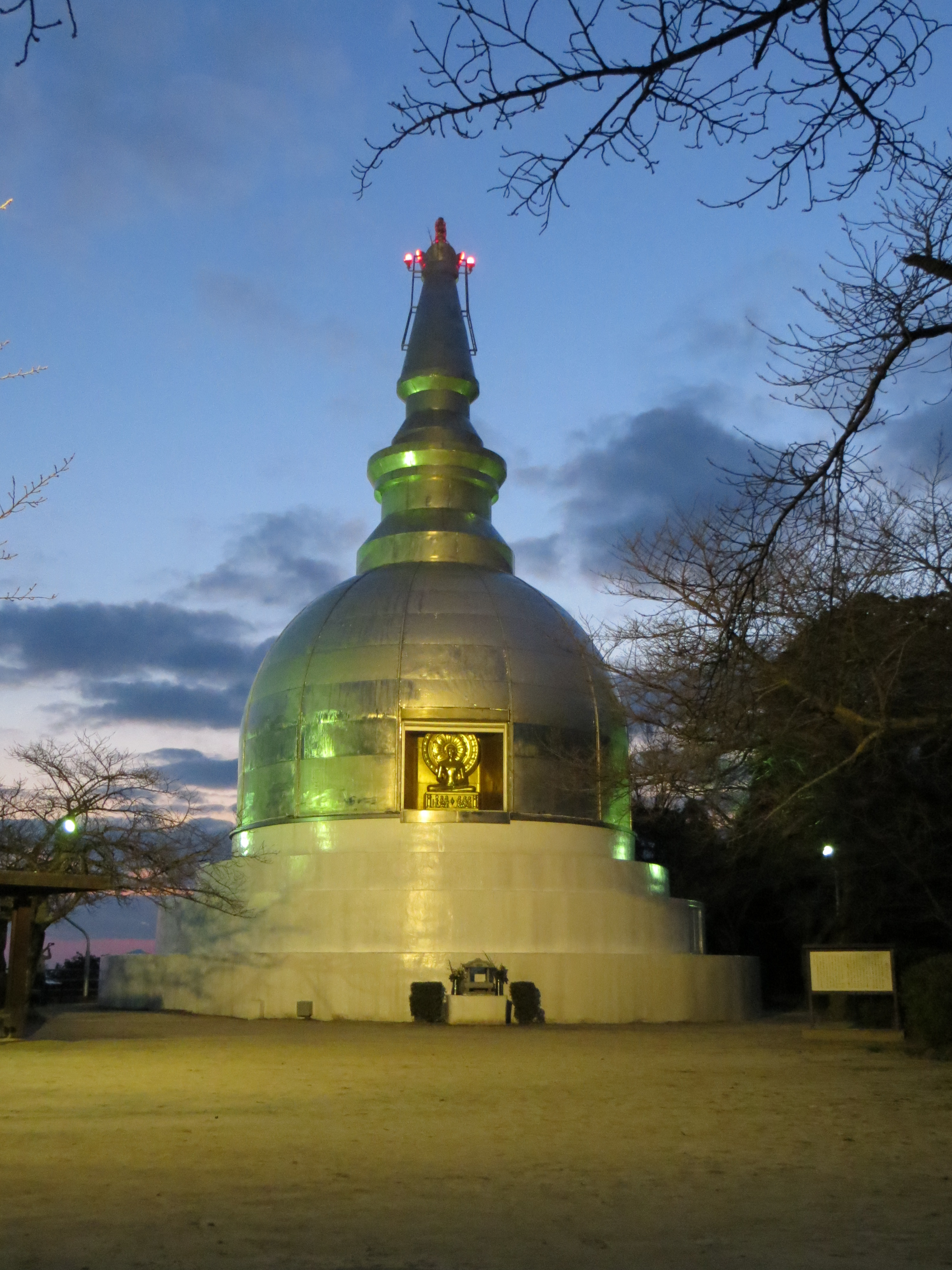
Peace Pagoda, Hiroshima.

The Hiroshima Peace Pagoda (34.4058702°N 132.4779358°E) was built in 1966 by Nipponzan Myohoji Buddhist monks. It commemorate the lives lost in the A-bomb blast, and contains gifts of Buddha's ashes from the then Prime Minister of India and Mongolian Buddhists. It is notable for being built partially of steel.

==== Nagasaki ====
The Peace Pagoda in Nagasaki, the site of the second A-Bomb attack, was inaugurated by Nipponzan in 1970.

==== Mount Kijosumi ====
At Mount Kiyosumi, the most predominant ceremonies held by Nipponzan tend to take place. The Pagoda was inaugurated in 1969.

==== Narita-shi, Chiba-ken ====
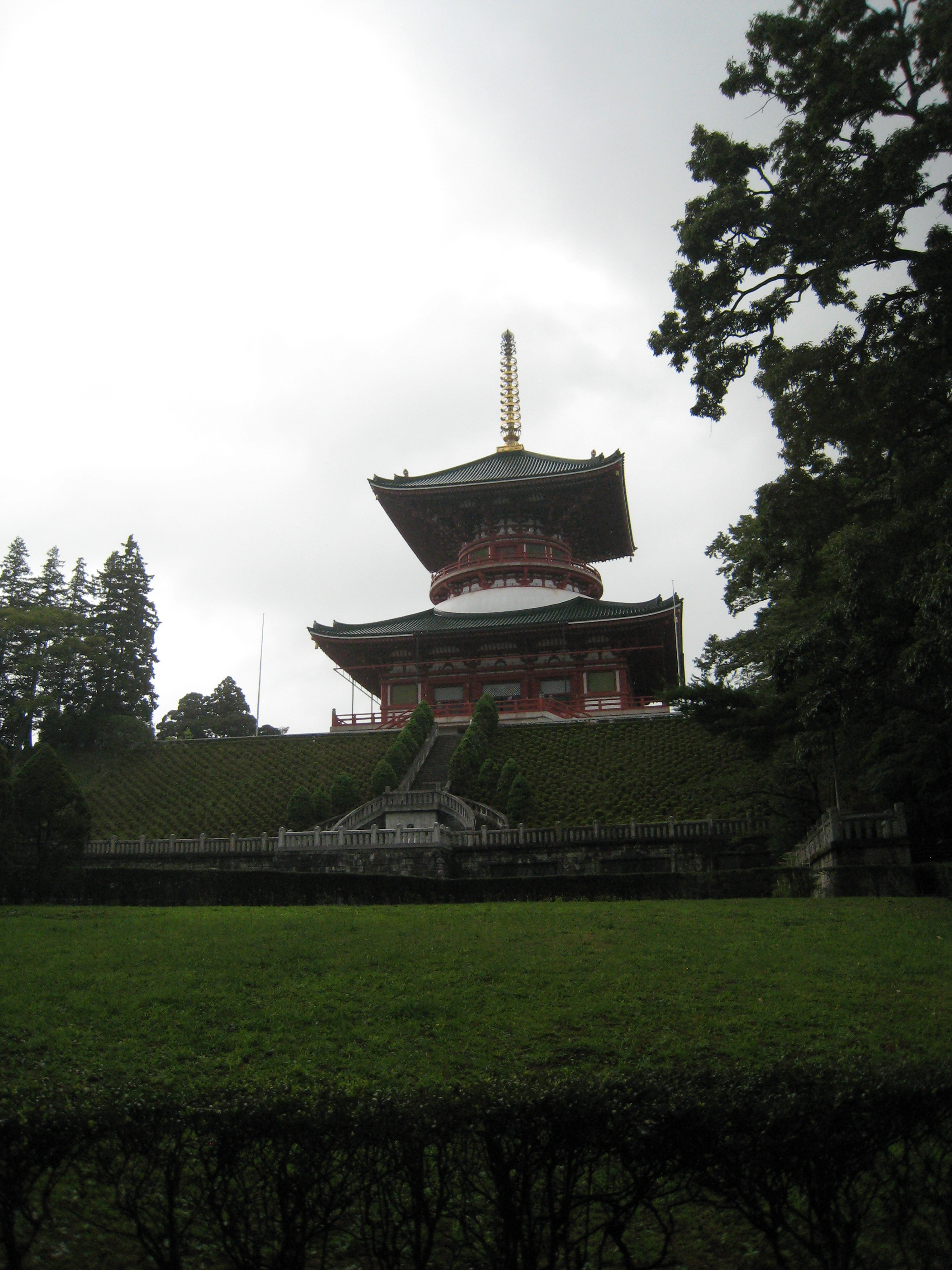
Narita, Chiba Great Peace Pagoda

Built in 1984, dedicated 13 May 2001, the peace pagoda at Narita-shi in Chiba Prefecture (35.741317°N 140.398277°E) is 58 m high and situated on a small hill.

==== Gotemba, Shizuoka ====
Founded in 1964, the Gotemba Peace Pagoda in Shizuoka Prefecture (35.284637°N 138.956364°E) includes a Nipponzan-Myōhōji temple.

==== Sapporo ====
This Peace Pagoda (Stupa) was built by Nipponzan-Myōhōji monks in 1959 halfway up Mount Moiwa (43.030385°N 141.330728°E). It was built to commemorate peace after World War II and can be seen from almost anywhere in Sapporo. It contains some of the ashes of the Buddha that were presented to the Emperor of Japan by Prime Minister Nehru in 1954. Later, another part of these were presented to Mikhail Gorbachev by the famous Nipponzan-Myōhōji monk, Junsei Terasawa.

=== Korea ===
==== Jeju Island ====
The Stupa is built in Jeju Island on the site where Venerable Masters Bowoo (d. 1565) and Jiahn (d. 1729) died. They gave their lives for Buddhism. The Stupa is the centre of many activities for the propagation of world peace and the unification of Korea. One such activity is the Lotus Sutra writing movement, and on 15 August each year people come and place hand-written copies of the Lotus Sutra into the Pagoda. This stupa is not associated with Nipponzan-Myōhōji.

=== Nepal ===
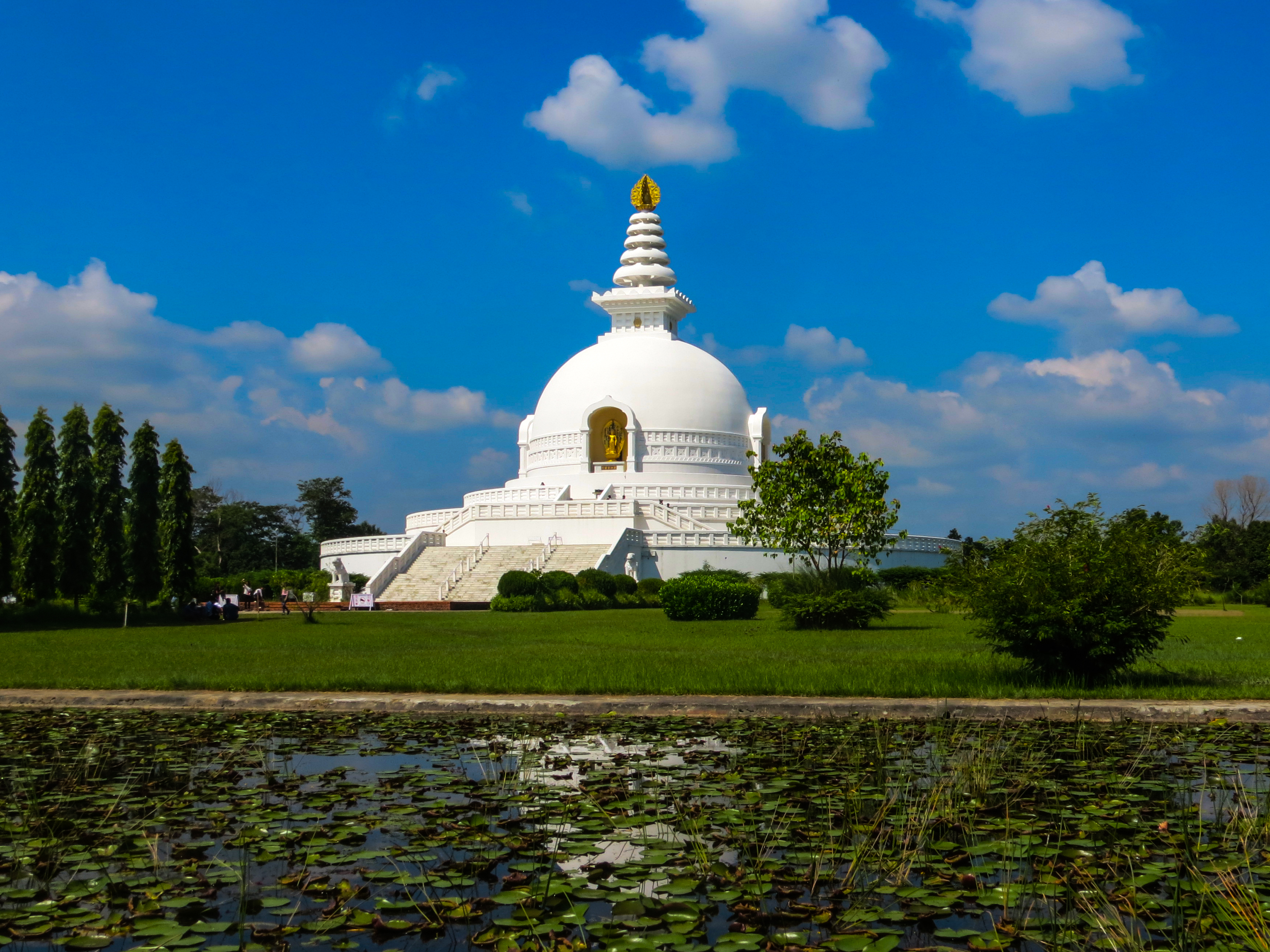
Lumbini's World Peace Pagoda

==== Lumbini ====
The Lumbini Shanti Stupa/Peace Pagoda (27.4989001°N 83.2762546°E) in Nepal was constructed by Nipponzan Myohoji monks and dedicated in November 2001 at the Buddhist pilgrimage site in kapilvastu district lumbini zone Nepal, where Queen Mayadevi is said to have given birth to Siddhartha Gautama, who in turn, as the Buddha Gautama, gave birth to the Buddhist tradition.

==== Pokhara ====
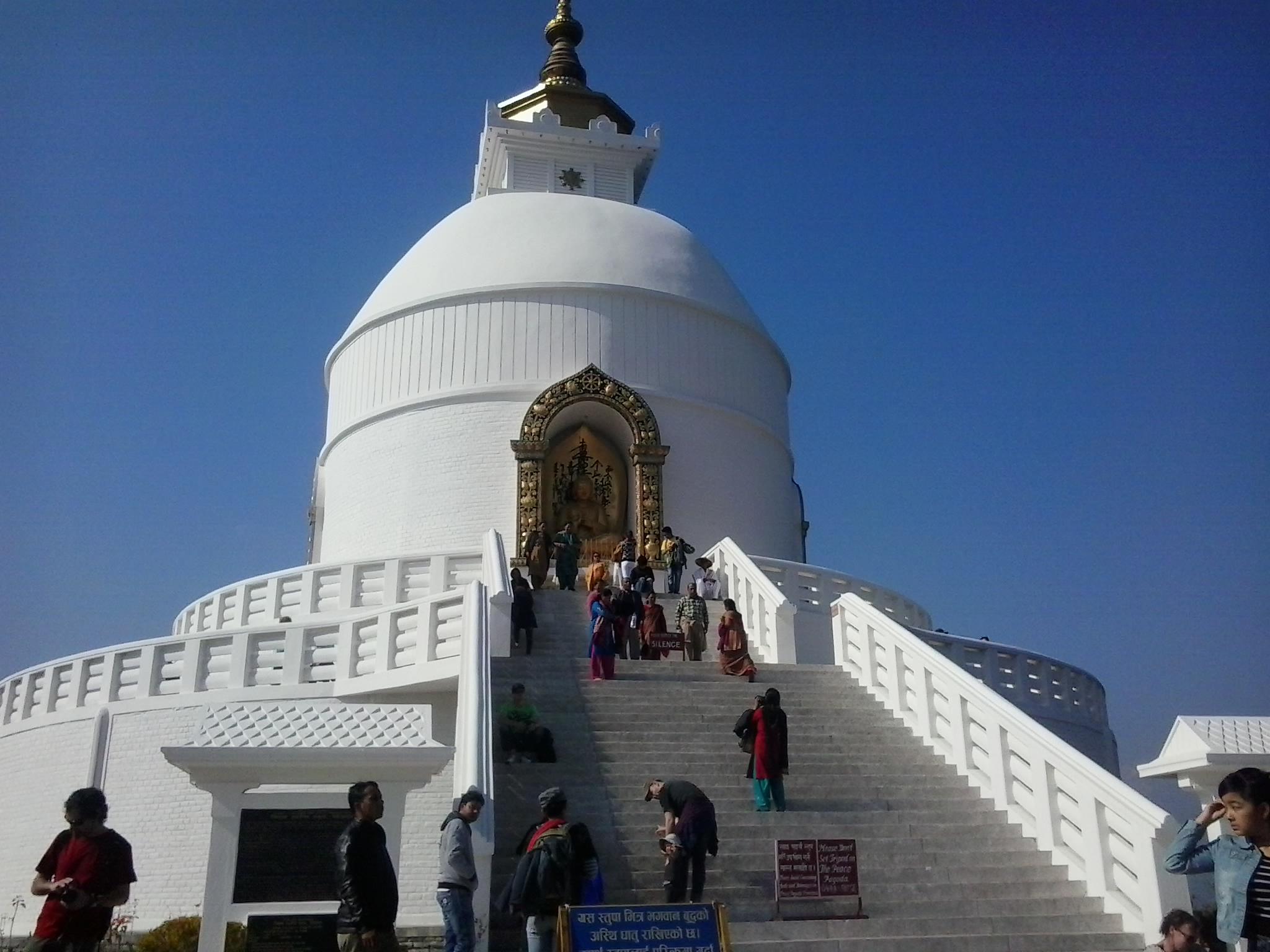
Shanti Stupa, Pokhara

Shanti Stupa in Pokhara is a large Buddhist stupa which was constructed by Buddhist monks from the Japanese Nipponzan Myōhōji organisation. The shrine has views of the Annapurna range and Pokhara city. A golden statue depicts the Buddha in the posture he assumed when he was born.

=== Sri Lanka ===
Peace Pagodas are referred to as Sama Chethiya (Sinhala: සාම චෛත්‍යය) in Sinhala.

==== Ampara ====
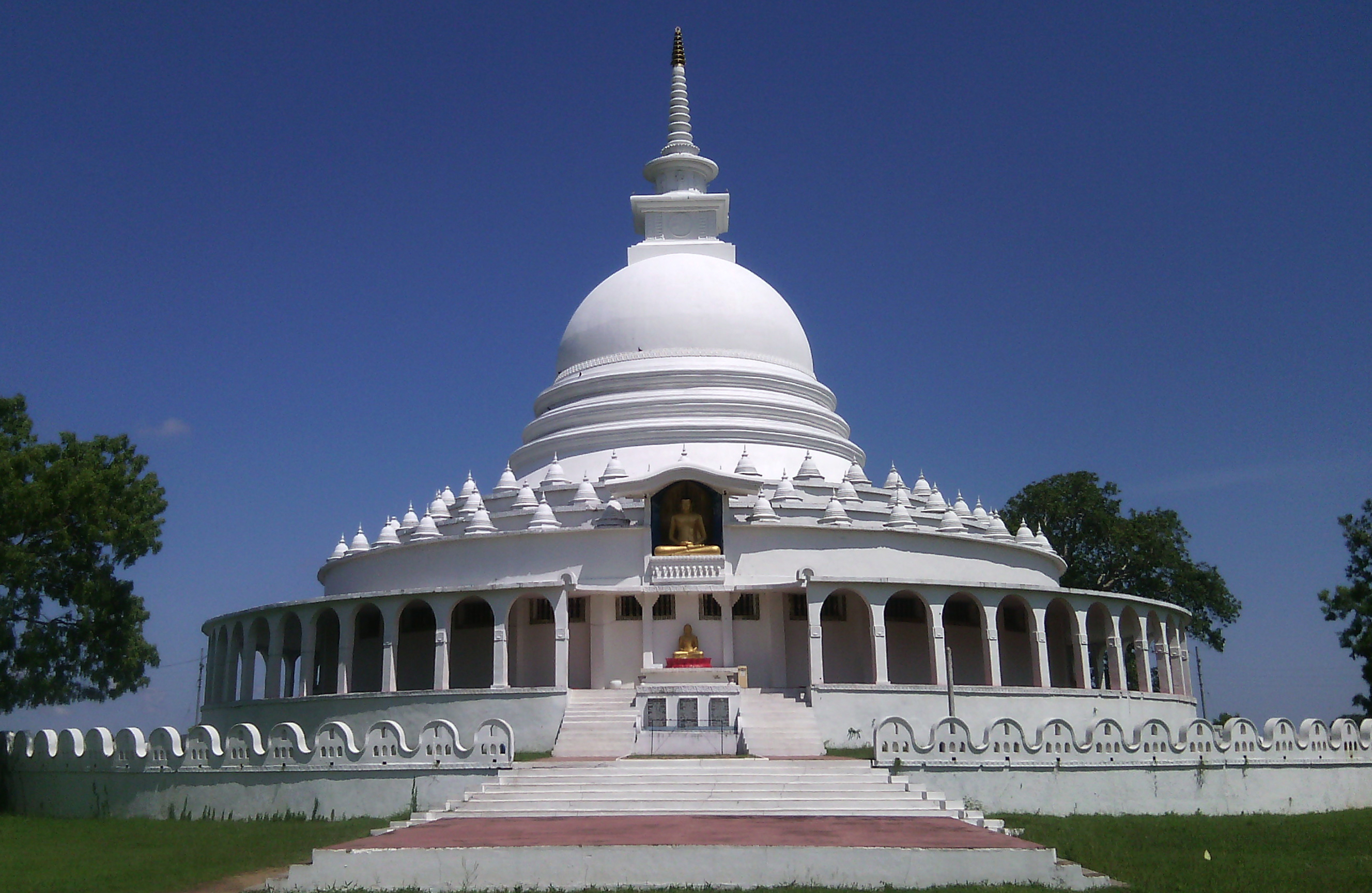
Peace Pagoda, Ampara, Sri Lanka

The Ampara Peace Pagoda (7.2852855°N 81.6539499°E) was built by Nipponzan monks under the leadership of Nichidatsu Fujii and was inaugurated on 27 February 1988. Ceremonies here are attended by large numbers of people.

==== Bandarawela ====
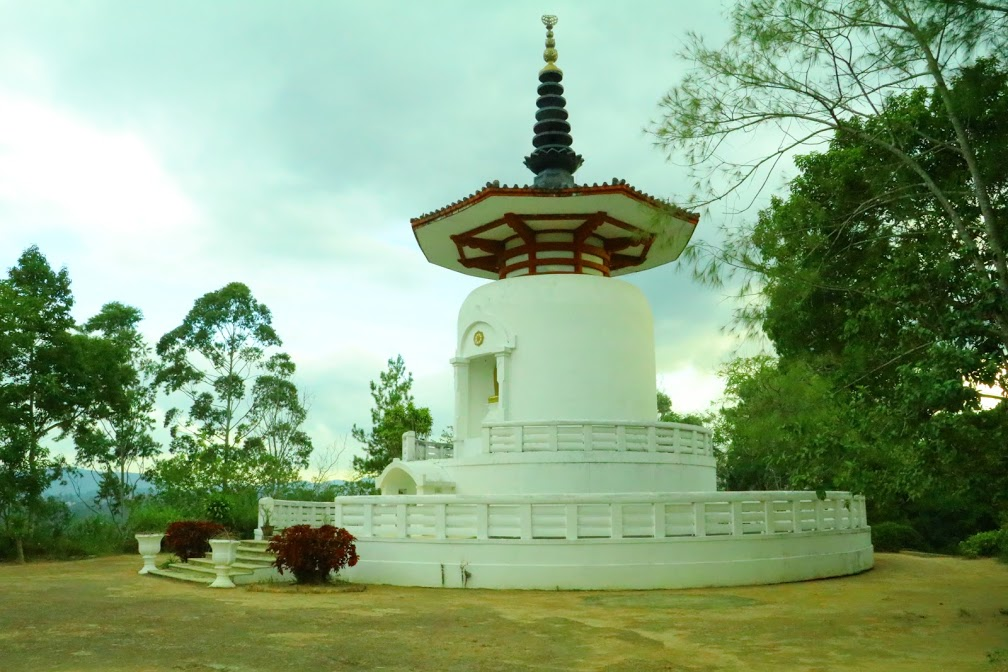
Peace Pagoda, Bandarawela

The Bandarawela Peace Pagoda (6.824508°N 80.98587°E) is located between the towns of Bandarawela Etampitiya road 6 Kilometers towards Bandarawela to Etampitiya. It was completed by Niponzan Myohoji monks in 1982.

==== Unawatuna ====
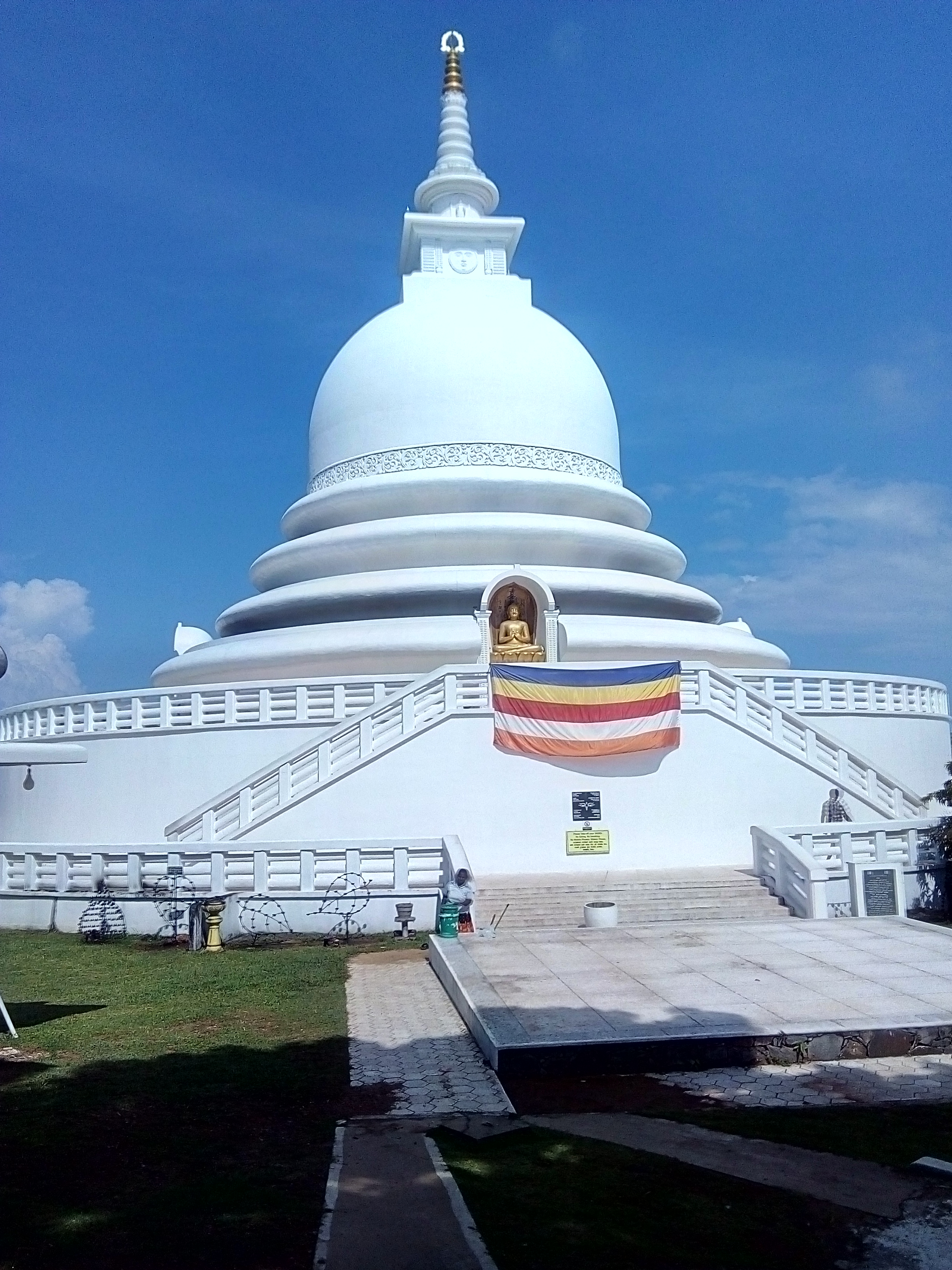
Unawatuna Peace Pagoda

The Unawatuna Peace Pagoda (6.0158585°N 80.2377972°E), built by Nipponzan Myohoji monks, is on the headland between Unawatuna and Galle.

==== Walapane ====
The Walapane Peace Pagoda (7.089642°N 80.861027°E), built by Nichidatsu Fuhi monk, is located on Walapane, Central Province of Sri Lanka. This is also called Japanese Sama Viharaya Walapane.

==== Sri Pada ====
The Sri Pada Peace Pagoda is located on the Sri Pada mountain trail, near Nallathanniya.

== Australia ==
=== Brisbane ===
Created by the Kingdom of Nepal for the 1988 World Exposition, Brisbane's World Expo 88, the Brisbane Nepal Peace Pagoda is now a permanent commemorative structure of the Expo. It is located at the transformed Expo site, South Bank Parklands.

The three-story Pagoda was constructed of 80 tons of art-carved Nepalese Terai timbers and assembled on the Expo site for the World Expo 88. It was relocated to its new riverfront location at the conclusion of the Expo for the opening of the Parklands in 1992. It now features commemorative displays of the Expo and is a place for quiet and reflection. There is a Peace Bell, and a Peace Post in the Pagoda garden. The Peace Pagoda in Brisbane was built by German architect Jochen Reier for the World Expo 88 on behalf of the Kingdom of Nepal.

== Europe ==
=== Munich, Germany ===
The Peace Pagoda in Munich's Westpark was built by German architect Jochen Reier (APAC) on behalf of the Kingdom of Nepal in 1982–1983. The temple was constructed with 80 tons of precious Sissam timber (rose wood) logged in the Terai (lowlands of Nepal) and was then carved by hand with intricate patterns. Over 300 Nepalese artisans in the Kathmandu area helped to build it. The Kingdom of Nepal was awarded with the gold medal for best nation building of the IGA´83 in Munich. Today the Peace Pagoda is part of Munich's Westpark because thousands of citizens and visitors helped to keep the "Asian Essemble" – and especially this Nepalese Shiva Pagoda – as a constantly remaining symbol of World Peace.

=== Vienna, Austria ===
The Vienna Peace Pagoda, on the Danube River, (48.1912047°N 16.4548101°E) was built on land donated by Elisabeth Lindmayer. Nipponzan Myohoji monks constructed the Pagoda, which was completed in 1983, the first peace pagoda in continental Europe. The Nipponzan Myohoji order led by Rev. Gyosei Masunaga have been active here for 25 years.

=== England ===
==== Birmingham ====
On 26 June 1998, the Dhamma Talaka Pagoda was dedicated in the Ladywood district of Birmingham. The Burmese monk and scholar, Aggamahapandita Rewata Dhamma, was the prime mover behind the planning of the pagoda and the new monastic complex that developed on the same grounds. Enshrined above its dome are Buddha relics once belonging to the Burmese royal family. The building therefore serves as a pilgrimage site and a focus for the Burmese community in Britain.

==== Milton Keynes ====
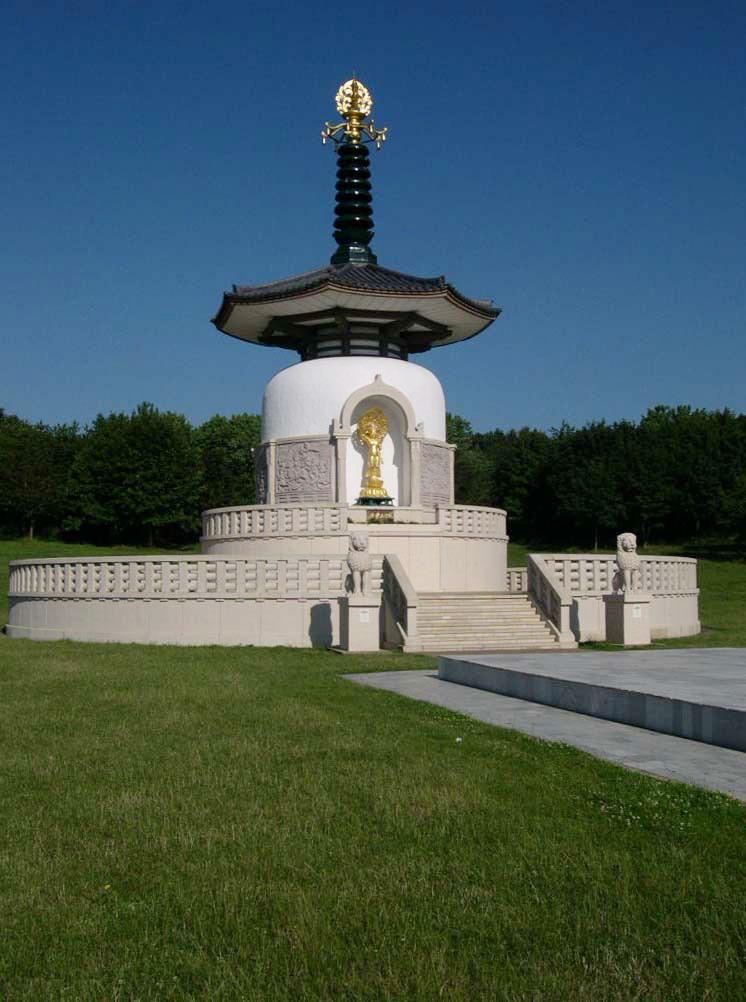
Nipponzan-Myōhōji stupa, Milton Keynes

The Milton Keynes Peace Pagoda (52.057697°N 0.725436°W) was completed in 1980 at the western edge of Willen lake in Willen, Milton Keynes. This was the first Nipponzan-Myōhōji Peace Pagoda in the western world. The pagoda has eight relief panels depicting the life of Buddha. There is a Nipponzan-Myōhōji Order temple and monastery nearby (52.055436°N 0.726181°W).

==== London ====
The London Peace Pagoda (51.482018°N 0.159025°W) was completed in 1985 on the south side of the River Thames in Battersea Park, London. Granting permission to build it was the last legislative act of the Greater London Council.

=== Comiso, Italy ===
The Comiso Peace Pagoda (36.9625422°N 14.6339001°E), built by Nipponzan Myohoji monks, was dedicated on 24 May 1998, the Reverend Morishita at Comiso (Contrada Canicarao, 100) in Sicily, Italy near the NATO base there.

=== Latvia ===
The Peace Pagoda in Latvia (56.662912°N 23.959158°E) was opened on 28 June 2014 near Garoza village in Salgale parish, Ozolnieki Municipality.

== North America ==
=== St Norbert, Manitoba, Canada ===
A stupa has been constructed at the St Norbert Arts Centre in St. Norbert (Winnipeg, Manitoba), Canada.

=== Los Álamos, Valle de Bravo, Mexico ===
The Asociación Cultural Tibetana A.C. ("Garuda") is constructing a stupa at Los Álamos, Valle de Bravo, Mexico State under the patronage of Tenzin Wangyal Rinpoche.

=== San Francisco, California, US ===
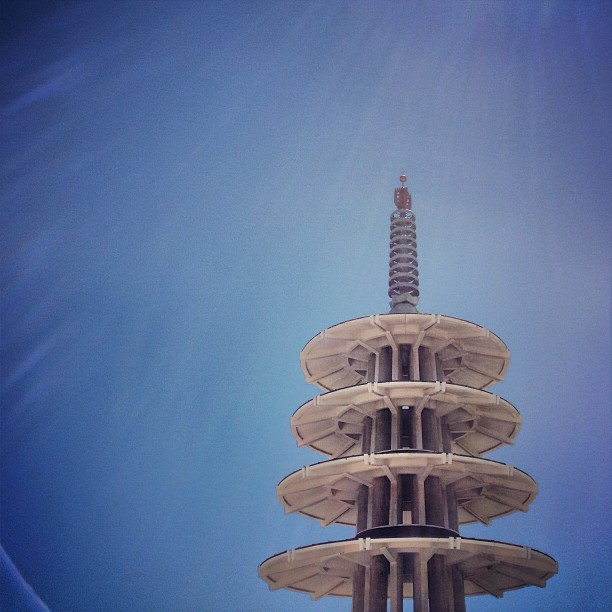
Peace Pagoda, San Francisco, CA

The Peace Pagoda in San Francisco (37.785054°N 122.429827°W) is a five-tiered concrete stupa in Nihonmachi (Japantown) between Post and Geary Streets at Buchanan. It is part of the Japan Center complex which opened in 1968. It was designed by Japanese architect Yoshiro Taniguchi and presented to San Francisco by the people of Osaka, Japan. This stupa is not associated with Nipponzan-Myōhōji.

=== Leverett, Massachusetts, US ===
The New England Peace Pagoda (42.498994°N 72.491108°W) is the first Nipponzan-Myōhōji Peace Pagoda to be built in the US and was completed in 1985. The Franklin County Technical School brought students from their electrical, plumbing, and carpentry shops to assist in building the temple.

The Nipponzan-Myōhōji monks of the New England Peace Pagoda were awarded the Courage of Conscience award on 5 June 1998 in Sherborn, Massachusetts.

=== Grafton, New York, US ===
The Grafton Peace Pagoda in Grafton, New York (42.751109°N 73.408756°W) was founded by nun Jun Yasuda, who serves as its caretaker, and was dedicated in 1993. The site, originally donated by local activist Hank Hazelton and built over several years by the surrounding communities, includes a temple, gardens, pond and the pagoda. Each year on September 11, a group of marchers begin a walk at the Grafton Peace Pagoda Site and end in New York City two weeks later.

=== Great Smoky Mountains, US ===
As of January 2015, the Great Smoky Mountains Peace Pagoda (35.8713972°N 83.1702692°W) is under construction. Land for the construction of the Great Smoky Mountains Peace Pagoda was purchased in 2000 and, by the end of 2014, a temple, gardens, Stone Pagoda, Spirit Garden, and guest house had been completed. Construction of the Peace Pagoda/Stupa itself is ongoing. The architectural design of Darjeeling Peace Pagoda is the model for the Peace Pagoda in the Smoky Mountains.

== Gallery ==
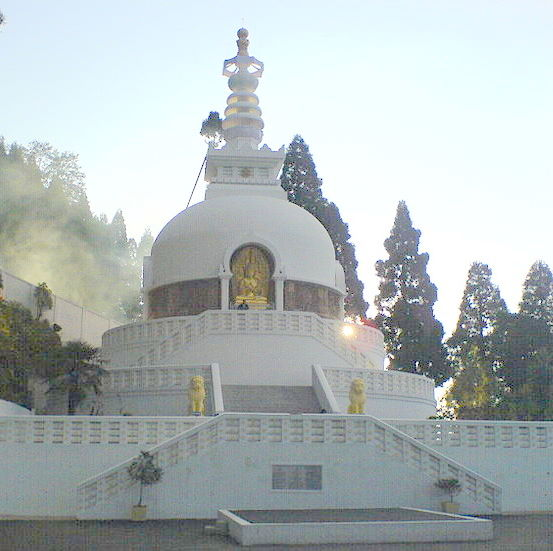
Darjeeling, India

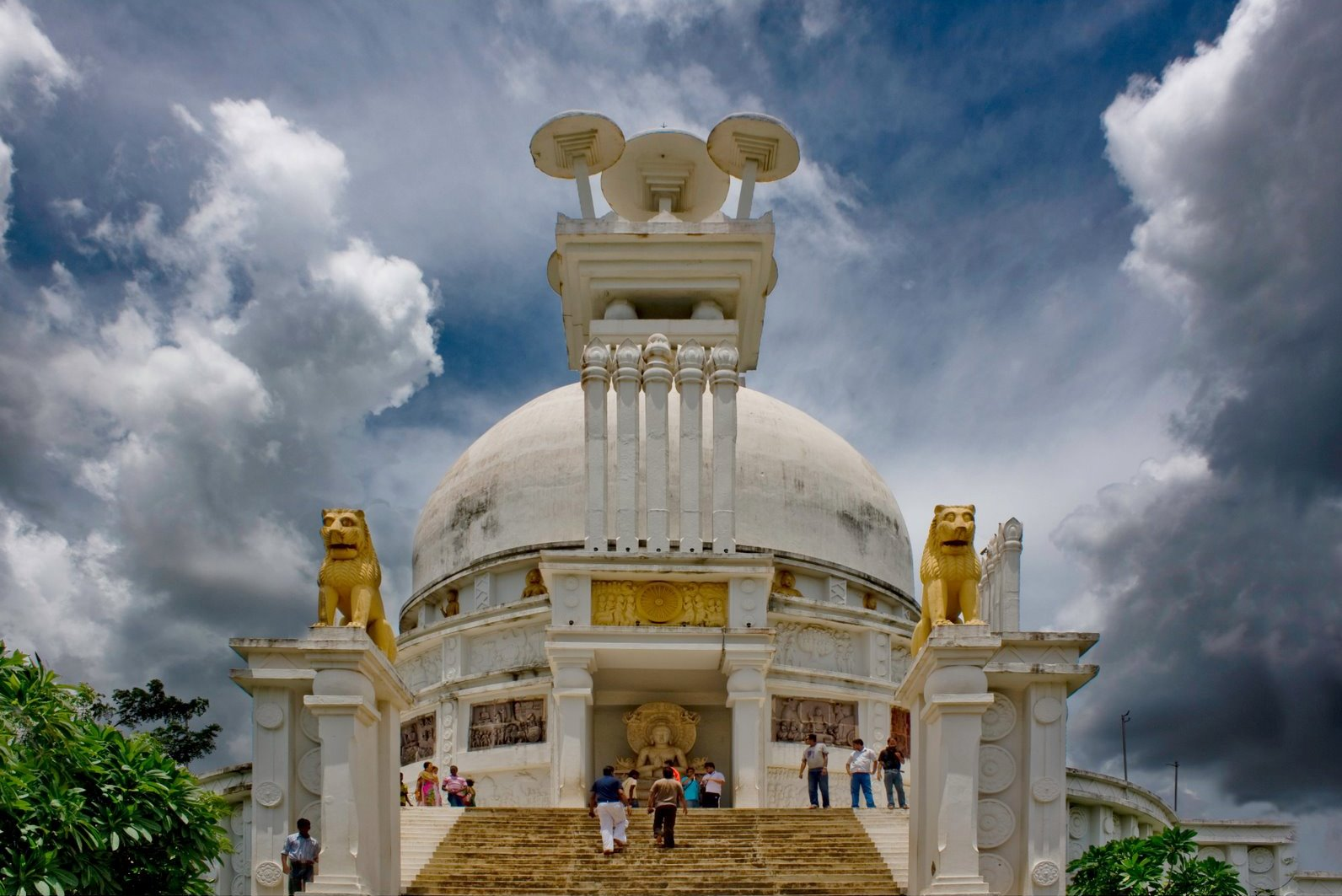
Dhauli Giri Peace Pagoda, Bhubaneswar, India

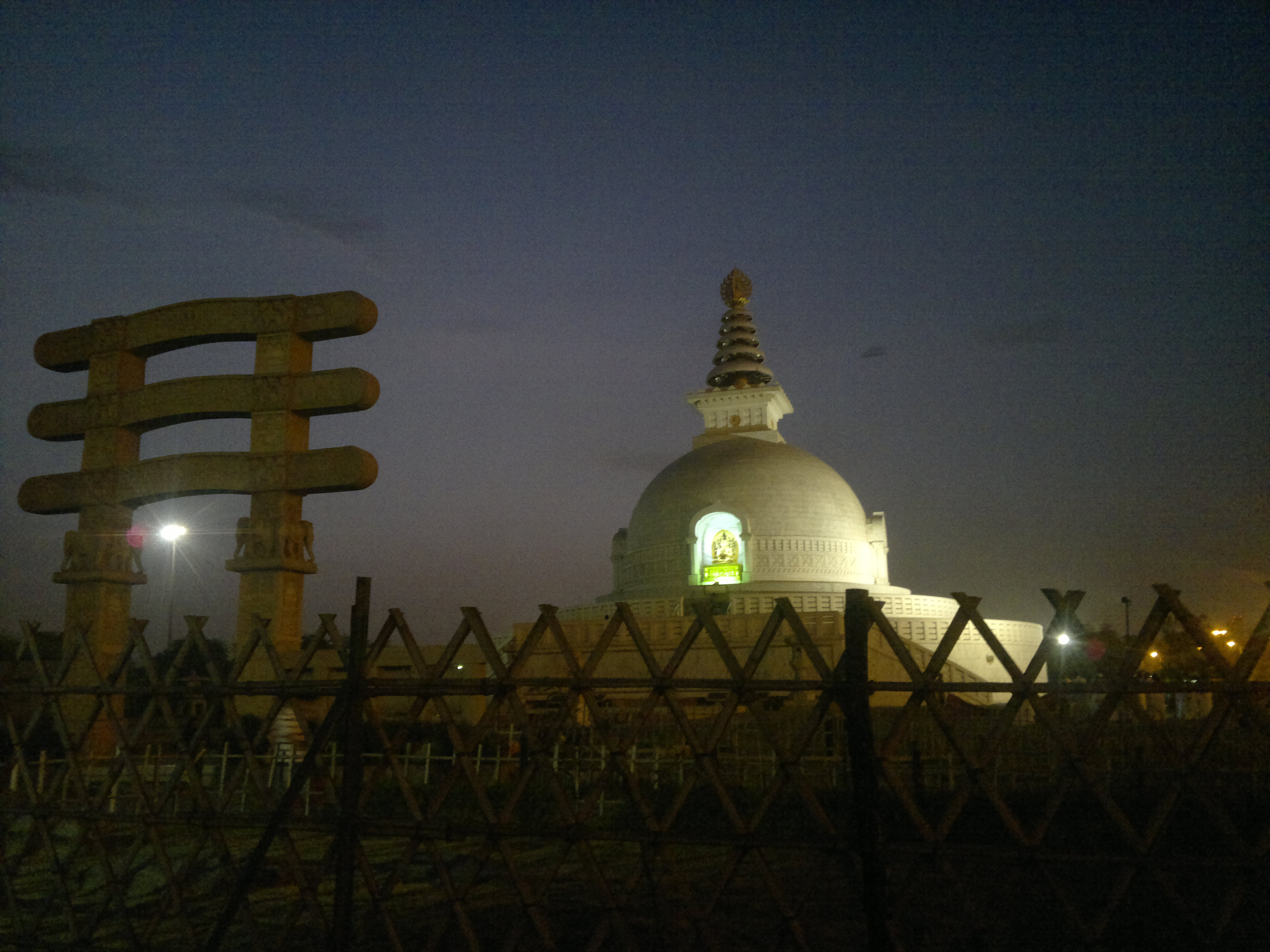
Vishwa Shanti Stupa Delhi

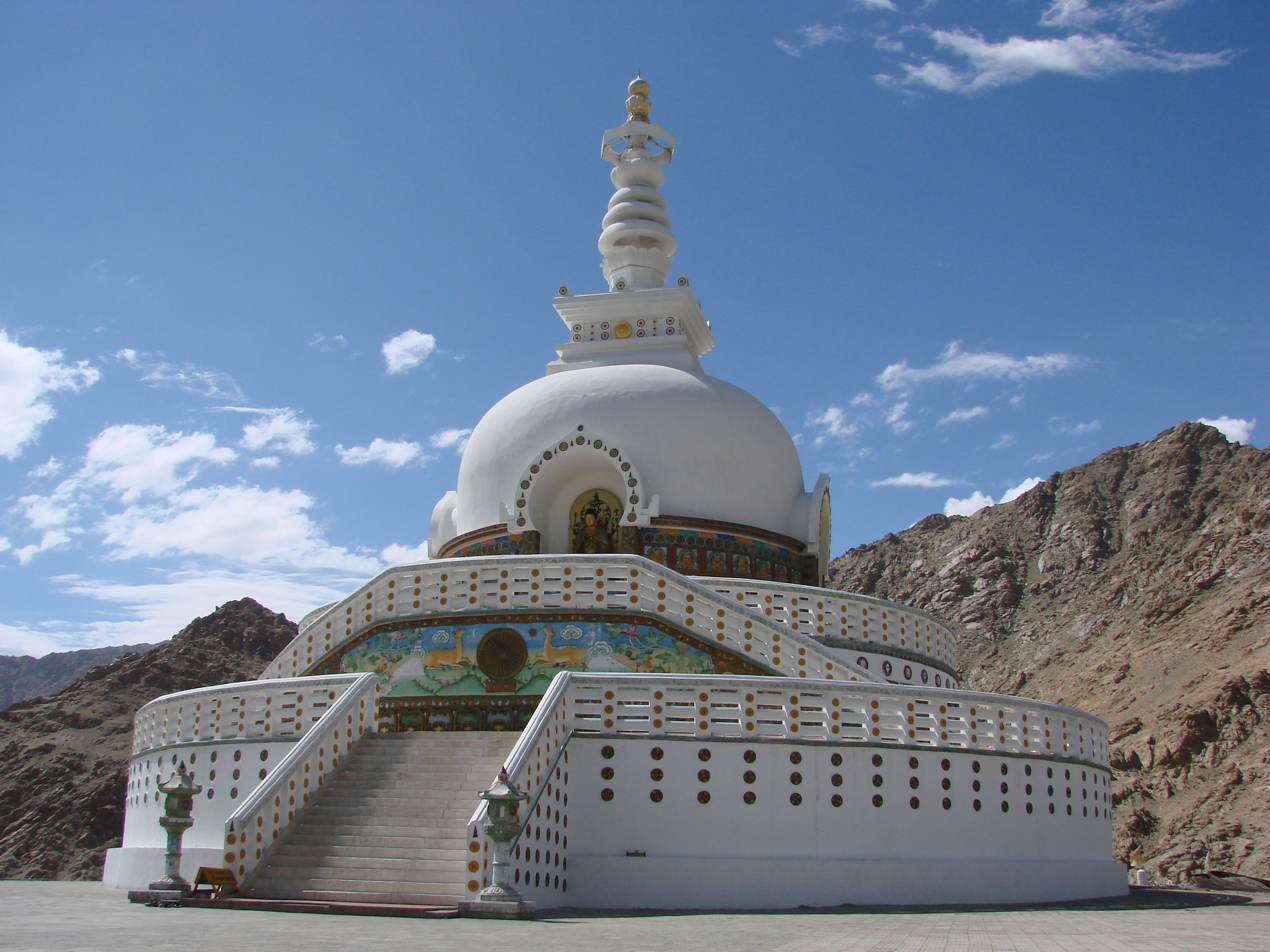
Ladakh, India

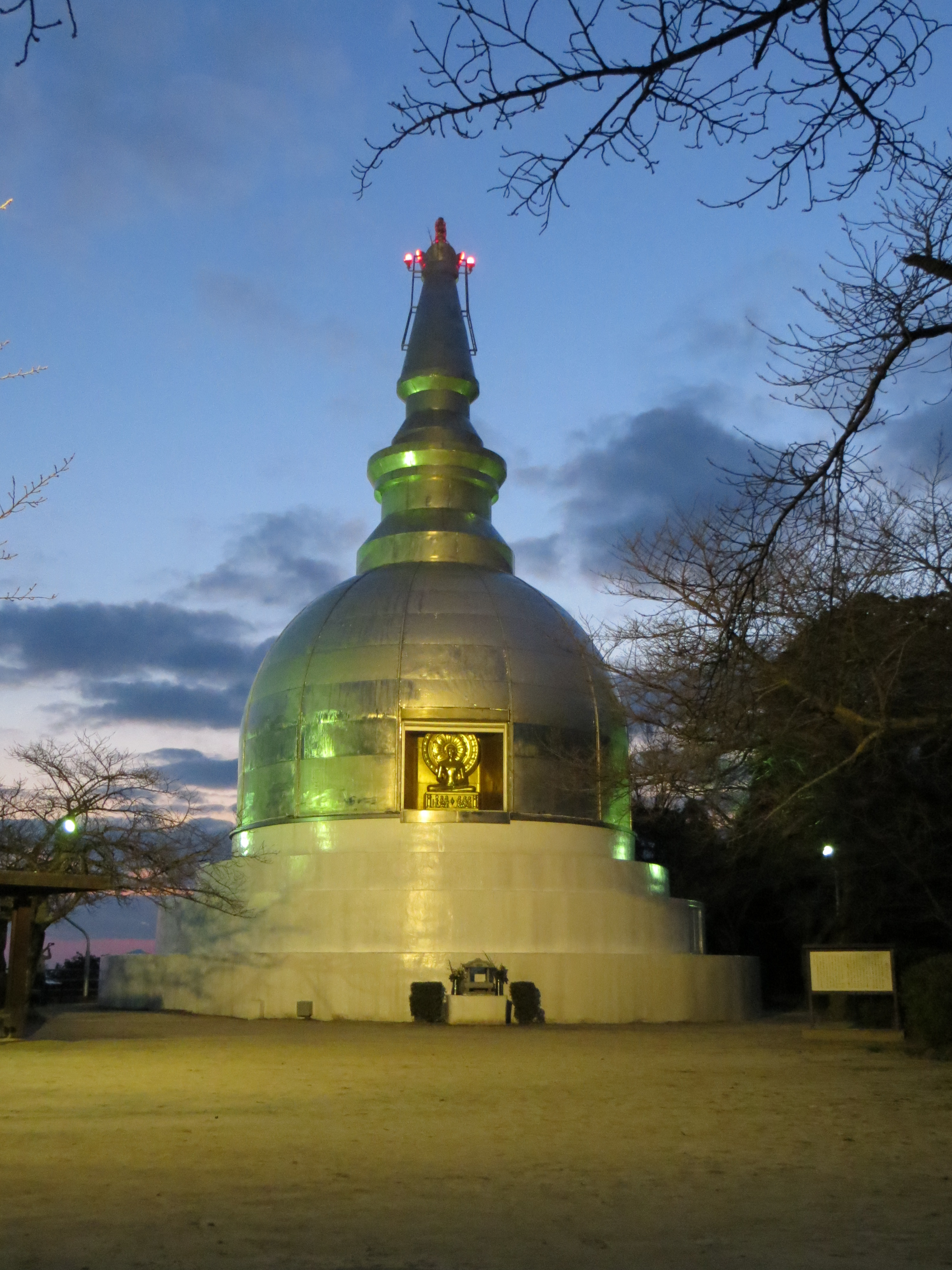
Peace Pagoda, Hiroshima, Japan February 9, 2013

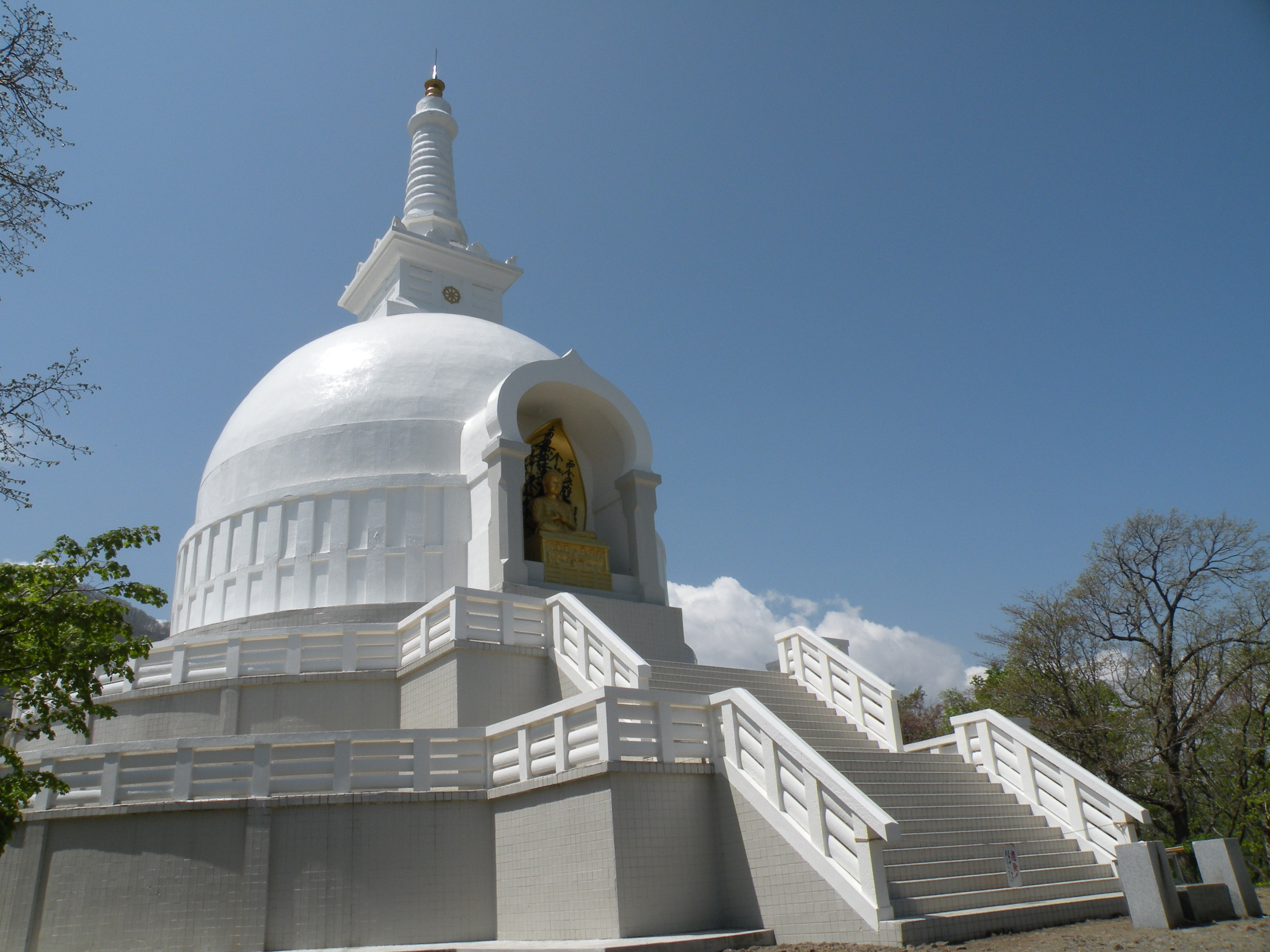
Sapporo, Japan

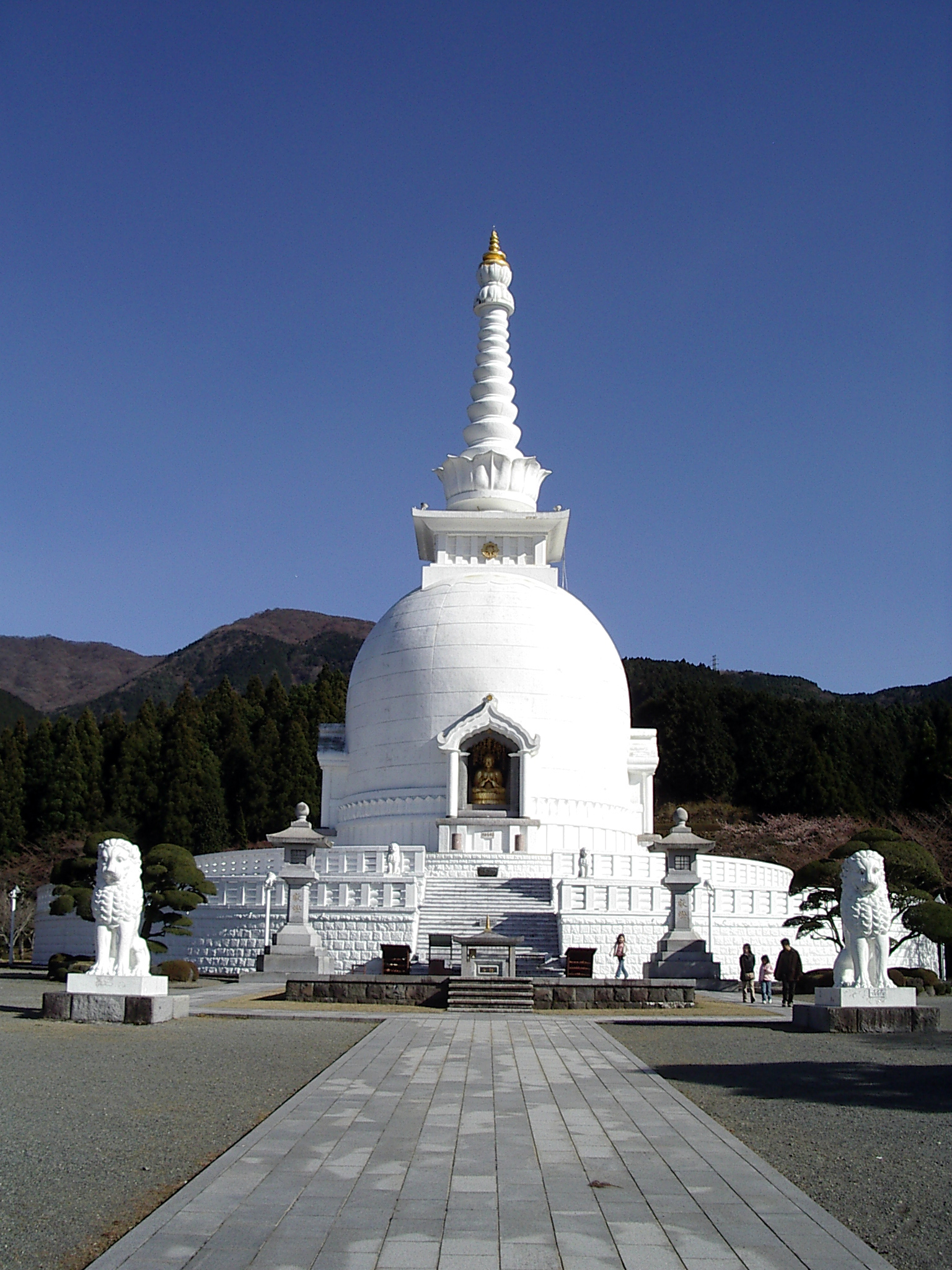
Gotemba, Shizuoka, Japan

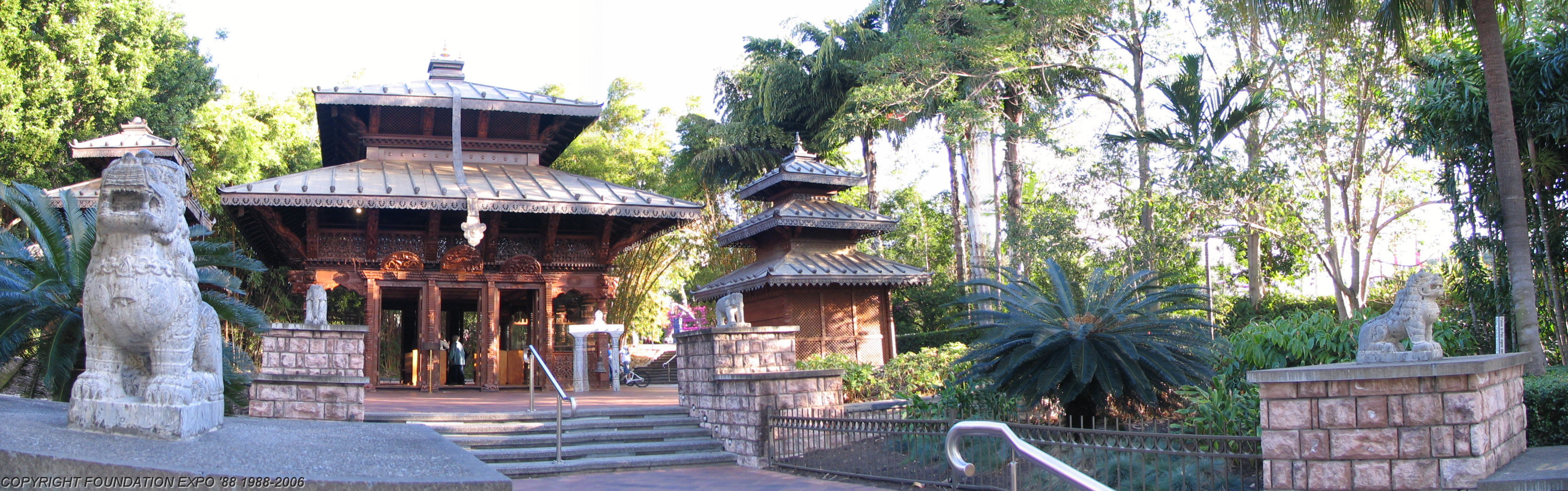
The Brisbane Nepal Peace Pagoda at South Bank Parklands.

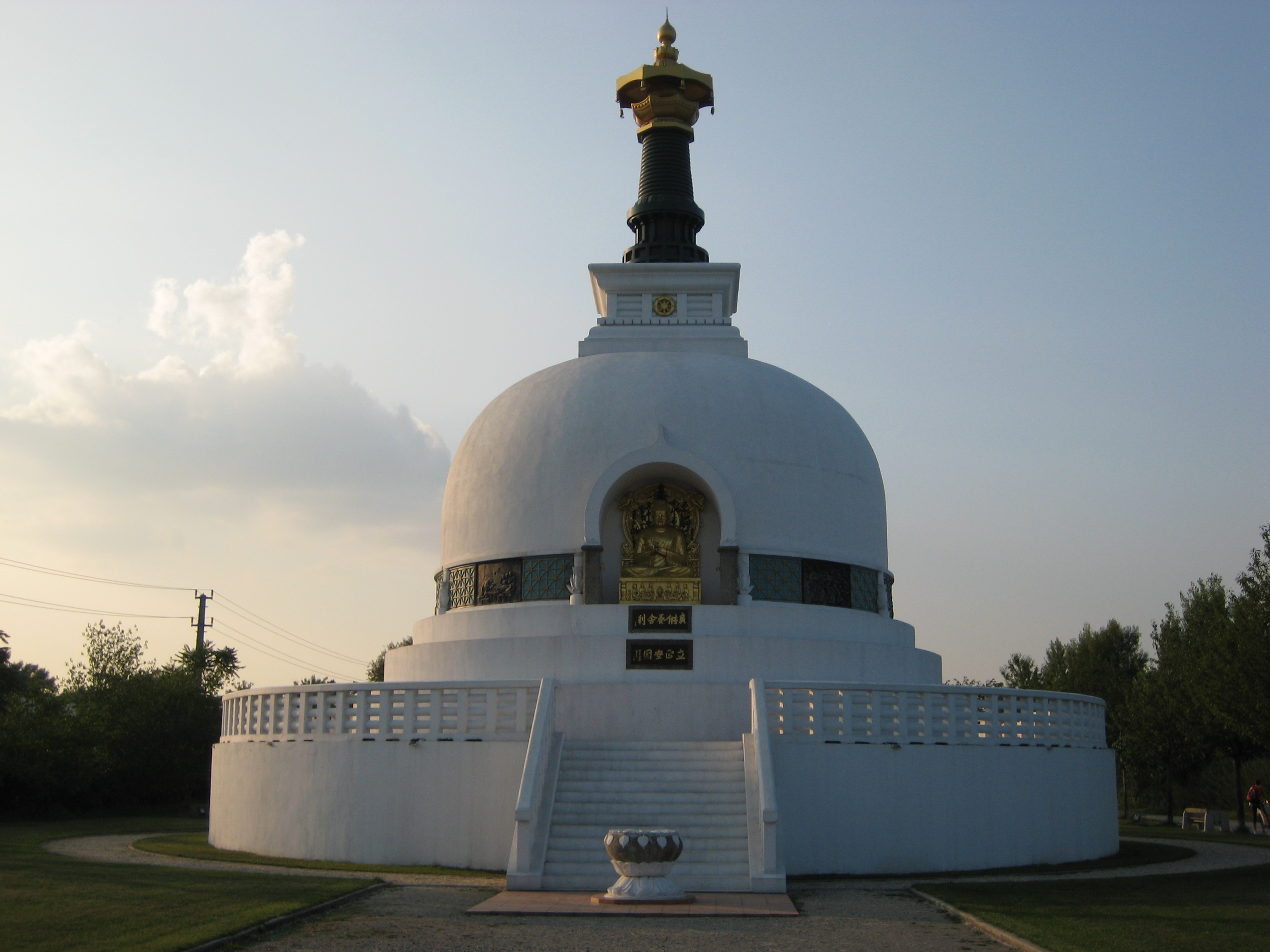
Vienna, Austria

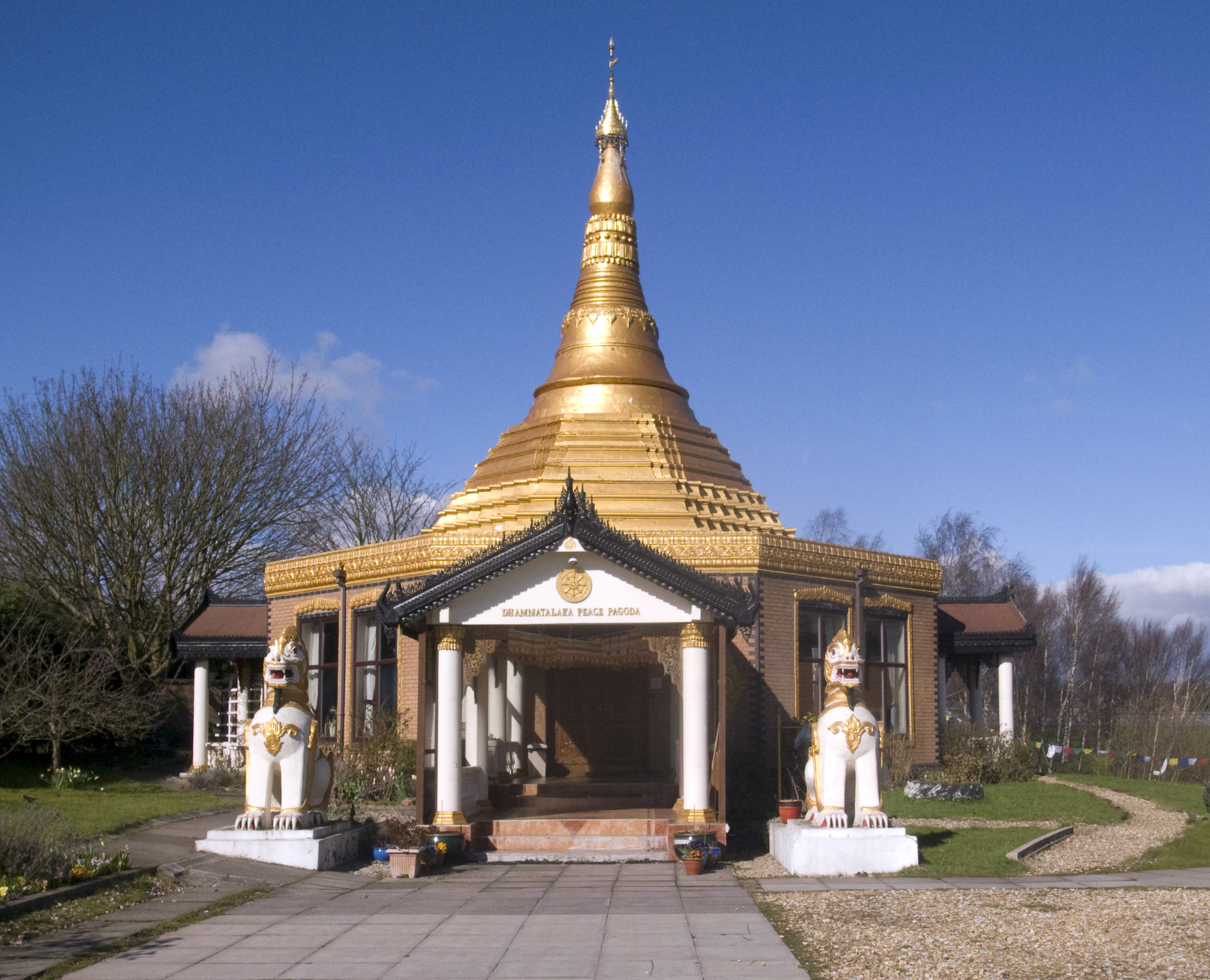
Dhamma Talaka, Birmingham, England

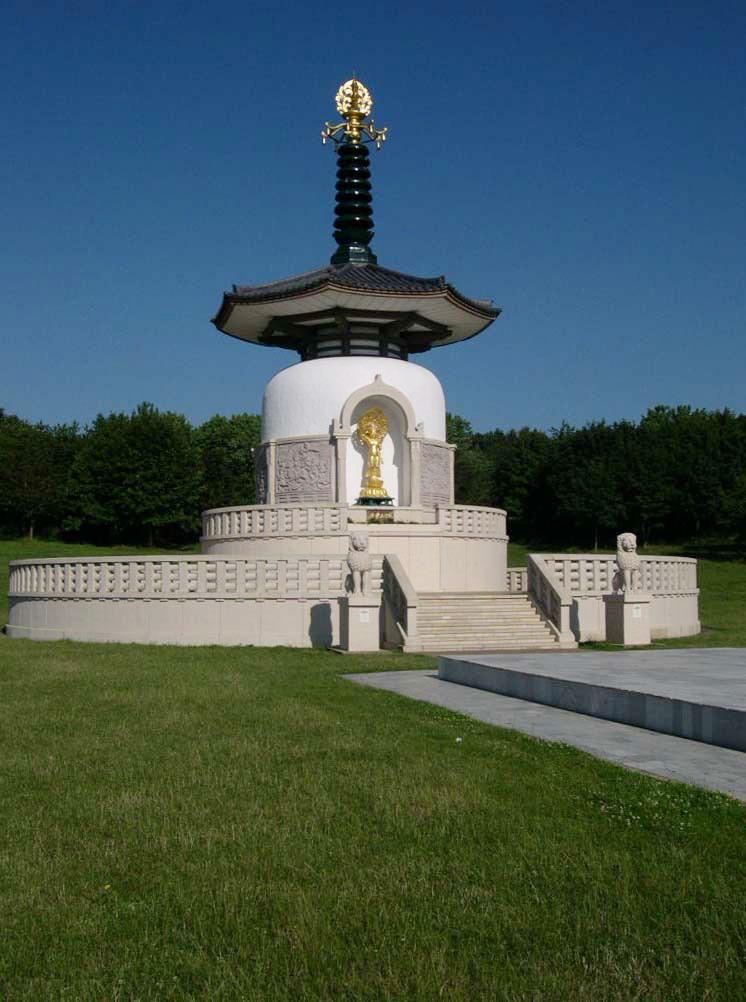
The Peace Pagoda in Willen, Milton Keynes, England

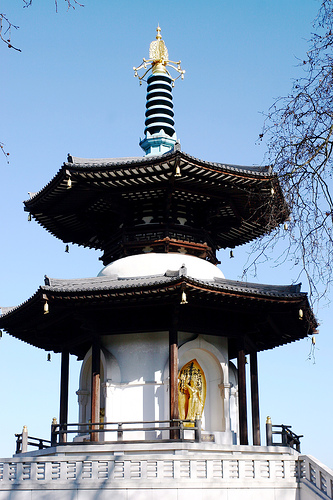
Peace Pagoda in London, England

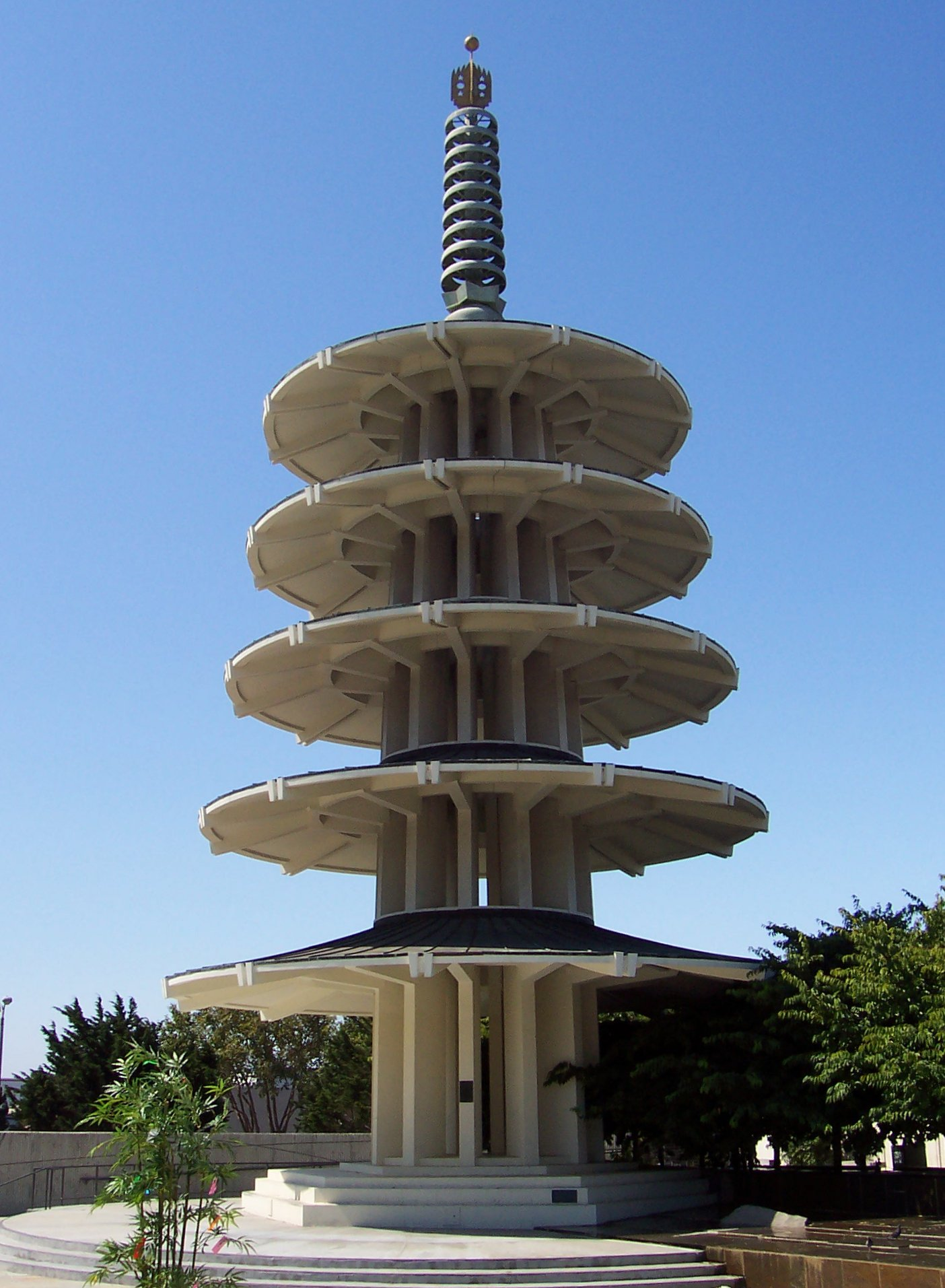
Peace Pagoda in Japan Center, San Francisco, California, USA

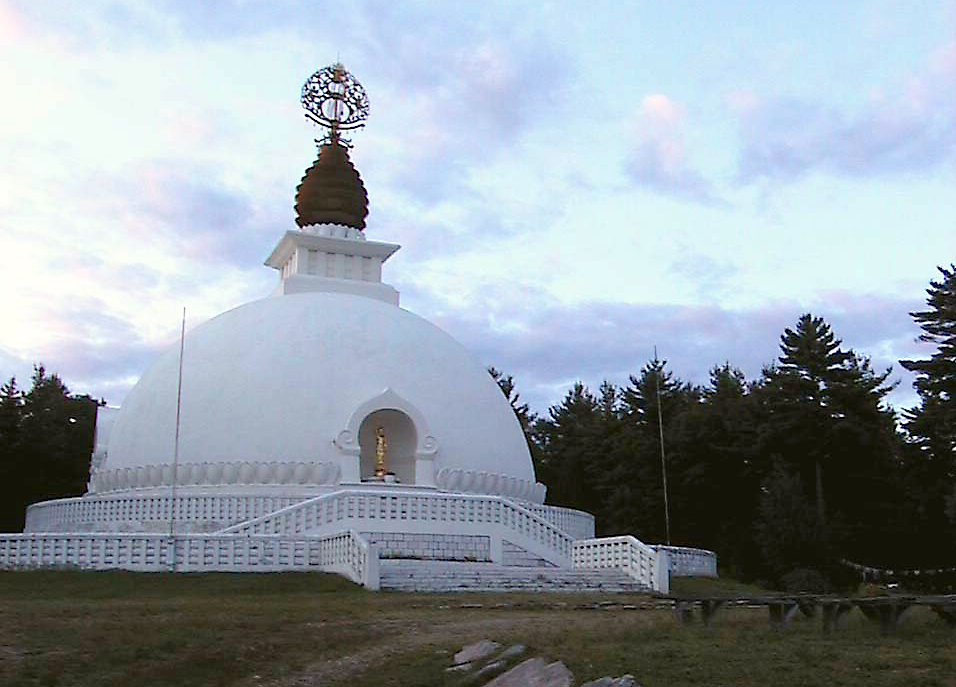
The New England Peace Pagoda in Leverett, Massachusetts USA

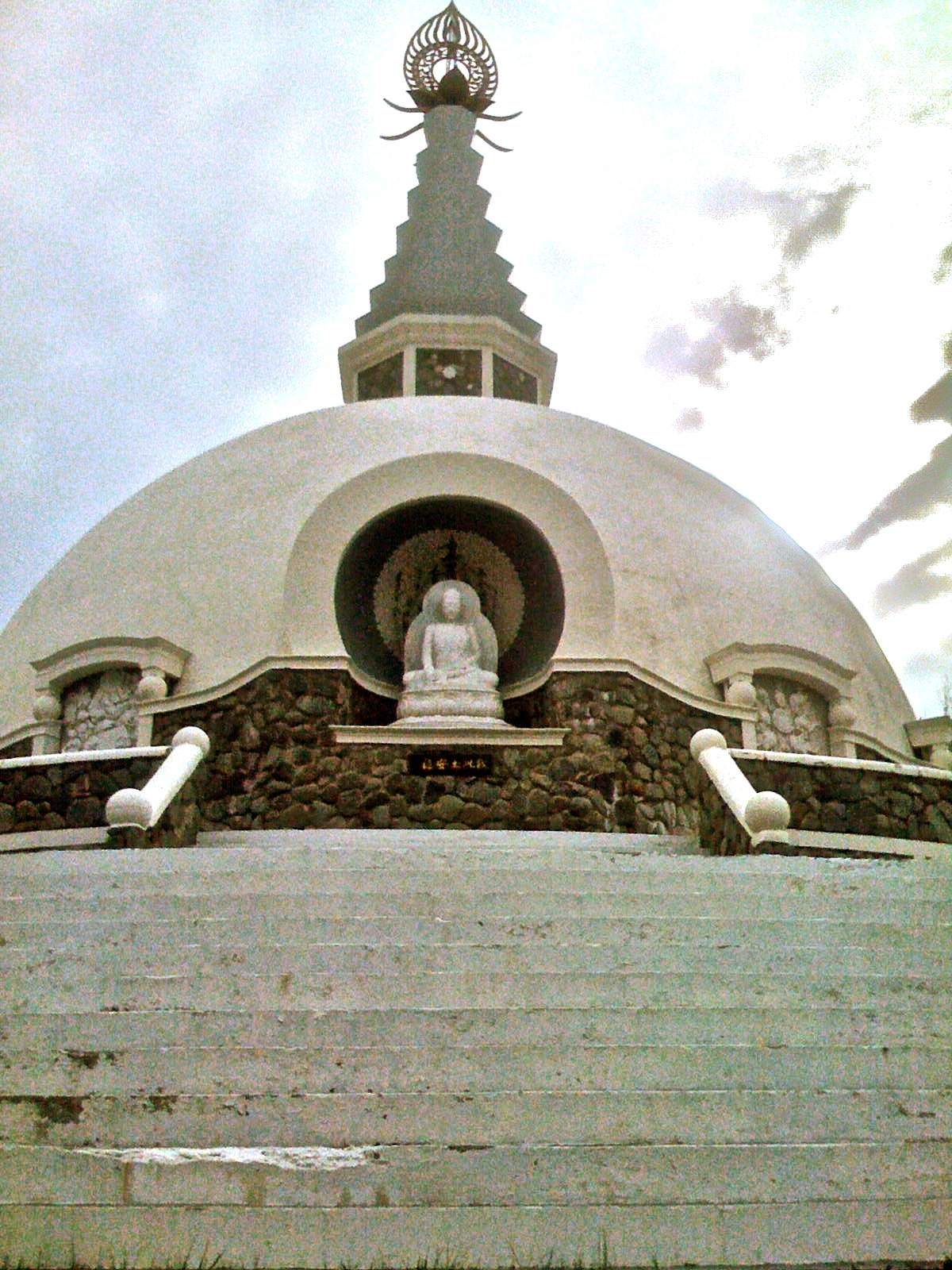
Peace Pagoda, Grafton, New York USA

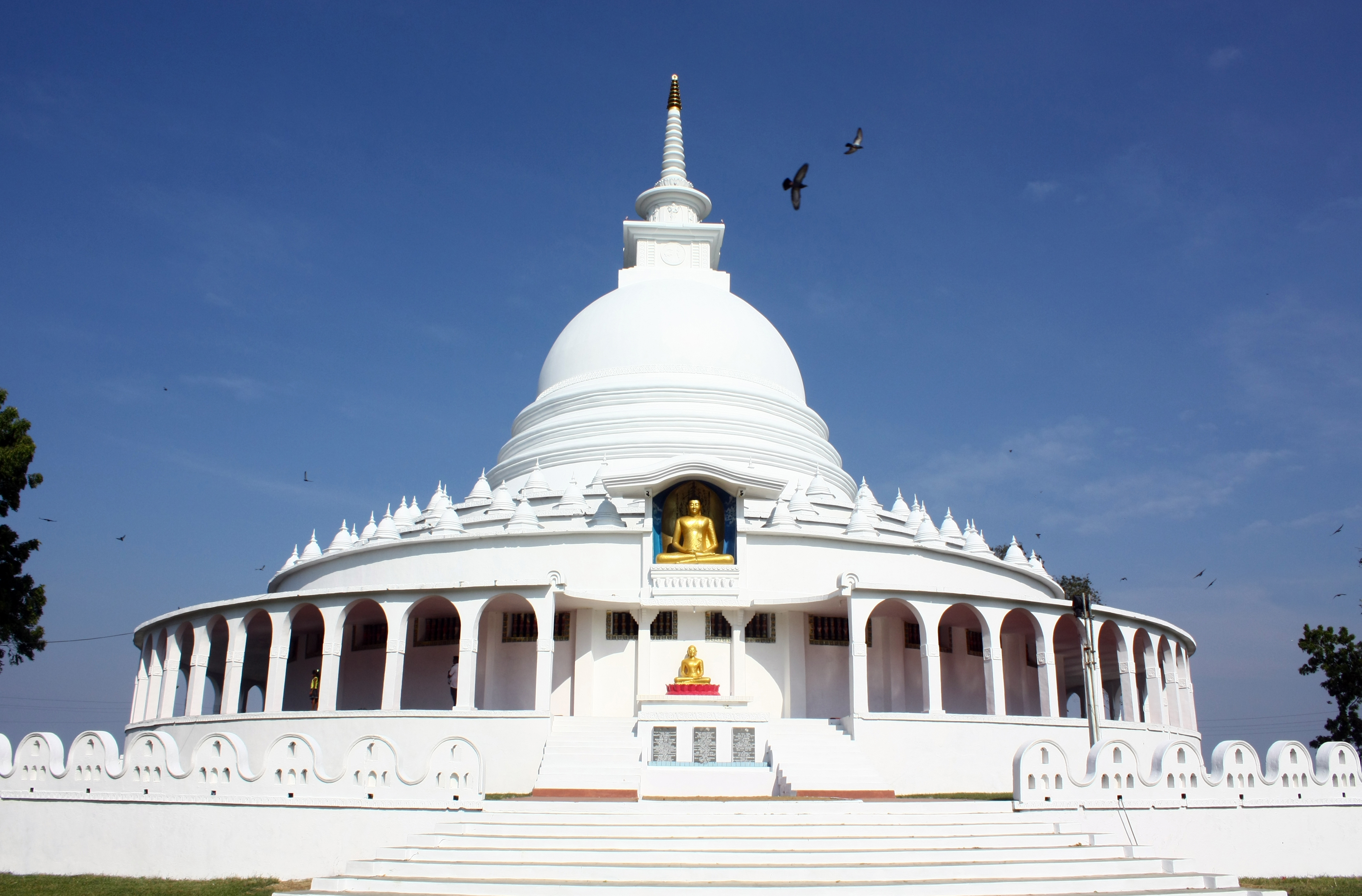
Peace Pagoda (Buddhist stupa) in Ampra, Sri Lanka.

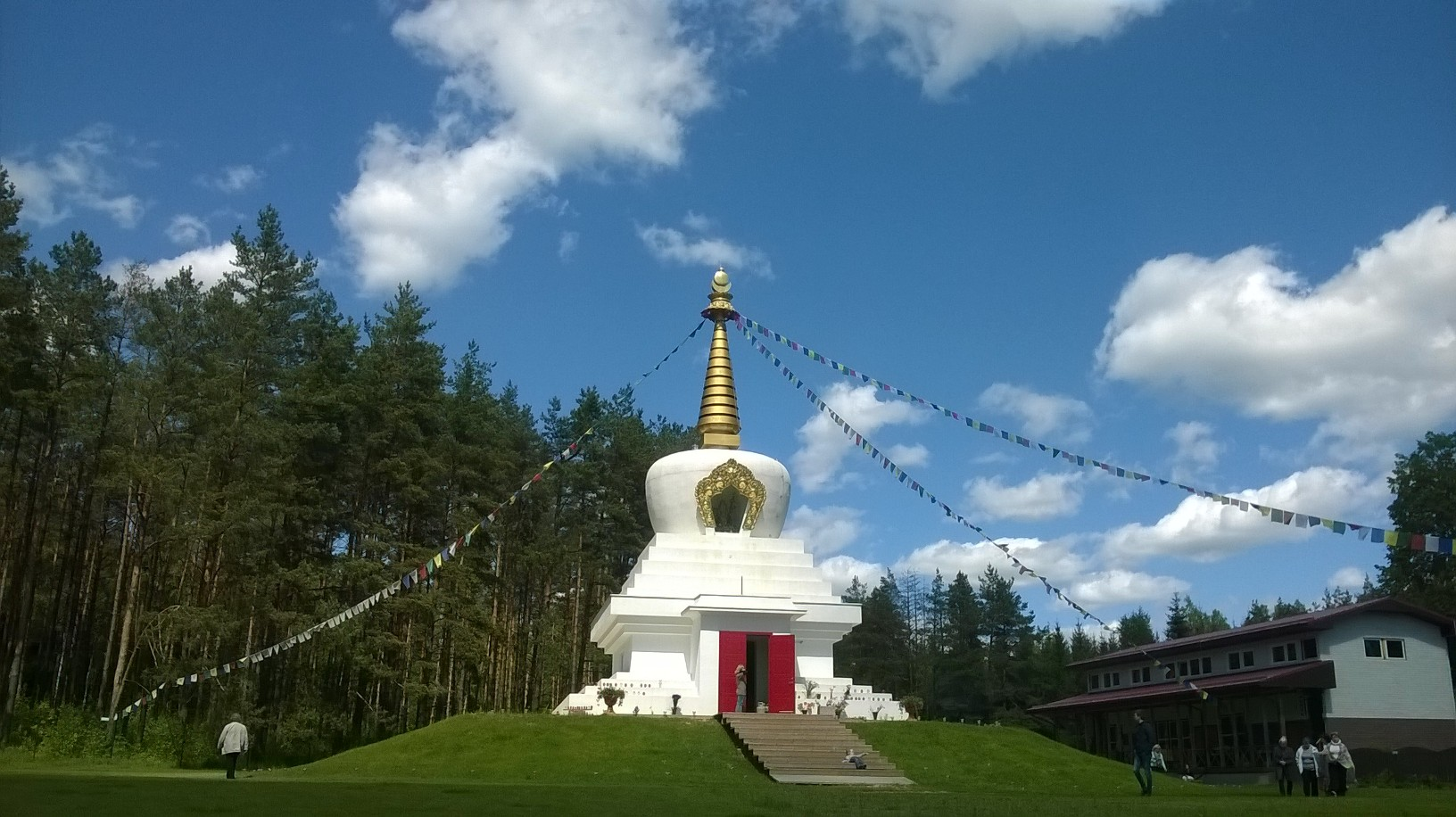
Peace Pagoda in Latvia

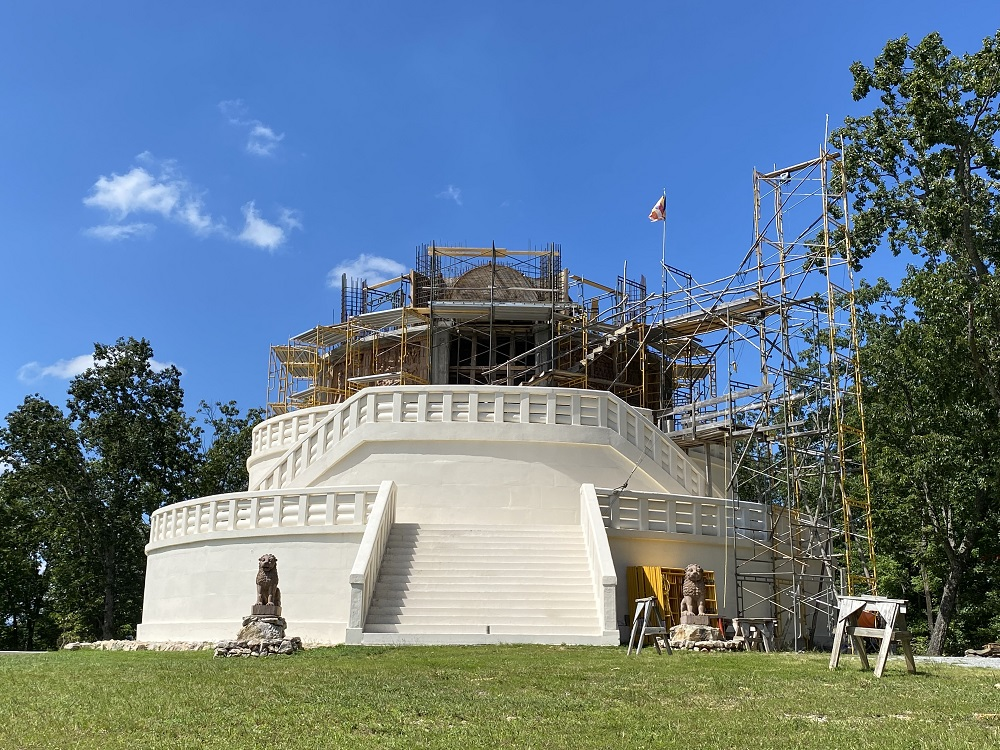
Great Smoky Mountains Peace Pagoda in Newport, Tennessee, USA

== See also ==
- Pan'kivka – Peace Pagoda Building
- Japanese Peace Bell
