= Battle of Garoza =

1287 battle in Latvia

- Part of the Livonian Crusade
Date	March of 1287
Location	Salgale parish, Latvia
Result	Semigallian victory

Belligerents
Livonian Order; Livonians; Latgalians; Citizens of Riga	Semigallians

Commanders and leaders
Willekin von Endorp †	Unknown Semigallian commander †

Strength
More than 40 knights more than 50 crusaders unknown number of allies	Around 1,400

Casualties and losses
Willekin von Endorp, 33 knights including several komtur's, unknown number of allies. More than 6 knights taken prisoners.	Unknown

The Battle of Garoza was one of the largest battles of the Livonian Crusade which occurred in 1287 between the Livonian Order and Semigallians in the territory of modern Latvia. It was a severe defeat for the order which lost its master and several komturs.

== Battle ==
In March 1287, around 1,400 Semigallians attacked the crusader stronghold at Ikšķile and plundered nearby lands. Almost immediately after the attack, the master of the Livonian Order, Willekin von Endorp, decided to invade Semigallia in revenge. The crusader army consisted of knights of the Order, units of citizens of Riga, and an unknown number of allied Livonians and Latgalians. The crusader army lost its track and wandered for a few days through forests and marshes in Semigallia. Finally, on 26 March, they made camp near the Garoze River. (Note: 56°37′0.41″N 23°55′47.53″E) However, the crusaders were followed by Semigallian scouts, so the location of their camp soon became known to the main Semigallian forces.

The next morning, the Semigallian army attacked the crusaders. At first, the battle went with varying success, but slowly the Semigallians gained the initiative and managed to besiege the crusaders' forces. Many of the knights were killed and many more, including a large number of allies, were taken prisoner. The Rhymed chronicle claims that only a few knights managed get back to Riga. Among the casualties were the master of the Livonian Order, Willekin von Endorp, and the Semigallian commander (sources do not mention his name).

== See also ==
- Garoza, a village in the Salgale Parish of the Ozolnieki Municipality. (Note: 56°37′37″N 23°56′22″E)

== Sources ==
- Livonian Rhymed Chronicle
- Chronica der Prouintz Lyfflandt (Chronicle of Balthasar Rusow)
