= Auči =

Village in Latvia

- Village
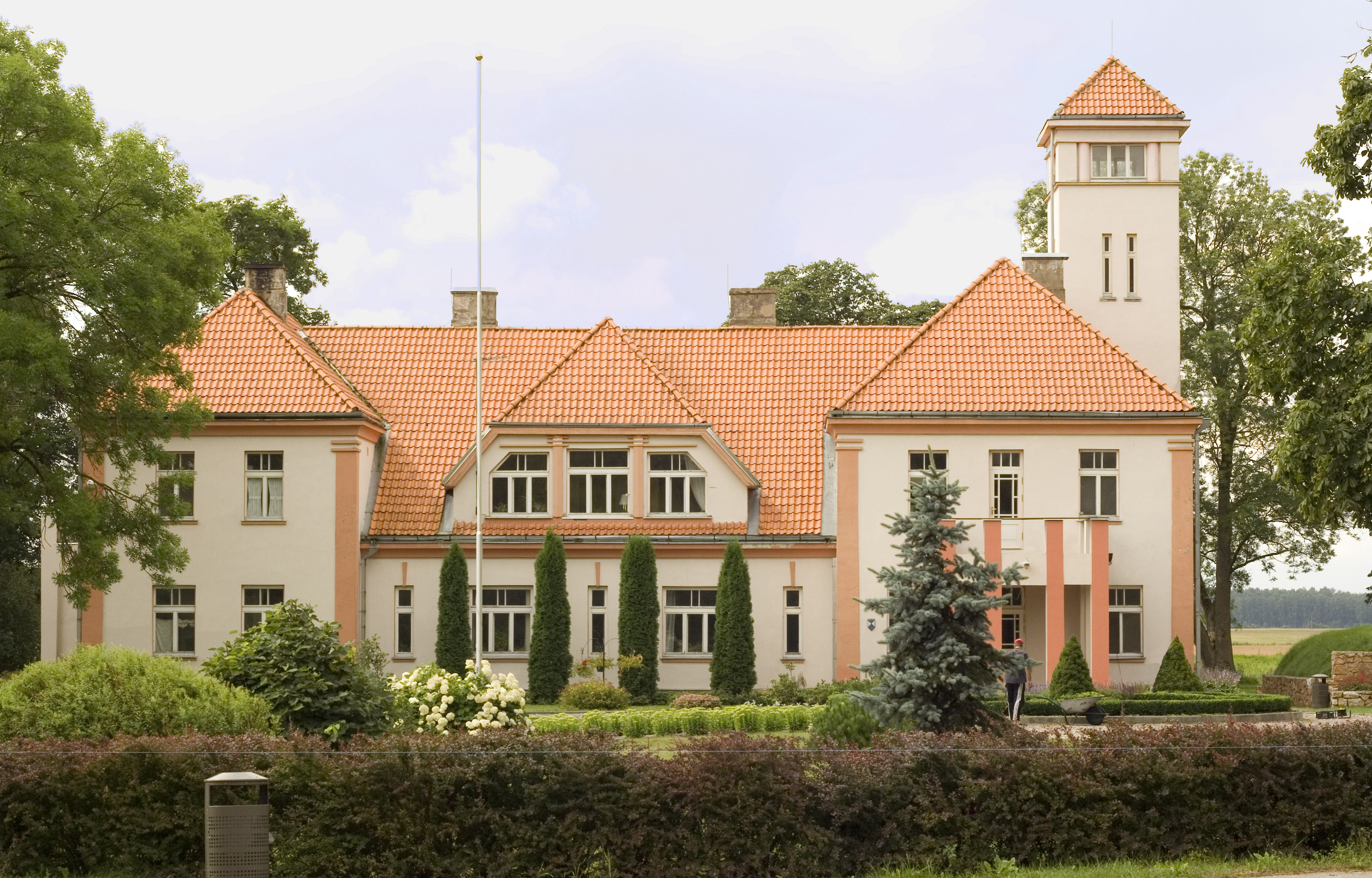
- Auči manor house with the museum of Jānis Čakste

- Auči location inside Latvia
- Coordinates: 56°35′40.60″N 23°57′22.50″E
- Country: Latvia
- Municipality: Jelgava
- Parish: Salgale

Population
  - Total: <100

Auči is a village in Salgale Parish, Jelgava Municipality in the Semigallia region of Latvia. The village is located on the Lielupe River approximately 18 km from the city of Jelgava.
