= Plāņi, Jelgava Municipality =

Village in Latvia

Plāņi
- Village
- Plāņi location inside Latvia
- Coordinates: 56°36′41.30″N 23°56′28.86″E
- Country: Latvia
- Municipality: Jelgava
- Parish: Salgale

Population (2005)
  - Total: 30

Plāņi is a village in Salgale Parish, Jelgava Municipality in the Semigallia region of Latvia (from 2009 until 2021, it was part of the former Ozolnieki Municipality). The village is located on the Lielupe River approximately 16 km from the city of Jelgava.
