= Jelgava district =

District of Latvia

Coordinates: 56°39′00″N 23°42′46″E

Jelgava district Jelgavas rajons
- District
- Coat of arms

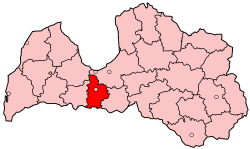
- Country: Latvia

Area
  - Total: 1,605.2 km^{2} (619.8 sq mi)

Population
  - Total: 37,054
  - Density: 23.084/km^{2} (59.787/sq mi)
- Website: jrp.lv/

Jelgava district (Latvian: Jelgavas rajons) was an administrative division of Latvia, located in Semigallia region, in the country's centre. It was organized into a city, two municipalities and twelve parishes, each with a local government authority. The administrative centre of the district was Jelgava. It preceded and used the symbols of the Jelgavas apriņķis of the interwar Republic of Latvia, which was created in 1920 from the previous Dobeles apriņķis.

Districts were eliminated during the administrative-territorial reform in 2009.

== Cities, municipalities and parishes of the Jelgava district ==
- Eleja parish
- Glūda parish
- Jaunsvirlauka parish
- Kalnciems city
- Lielplatone parish
- Līvbērze parish
- Ozolnieki municipality
- Platone parish
- Sesava parish
- Sidrabene parish
- Svēte parish
- Valgunde municipality
- Vilce parish
- Vircava parish
- Zaļenieki parish
