= Salgale Parish =

Parish of Latvia

- parish of Latvia
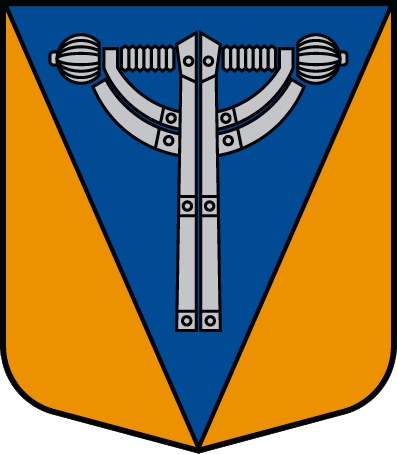
- Coat of arms

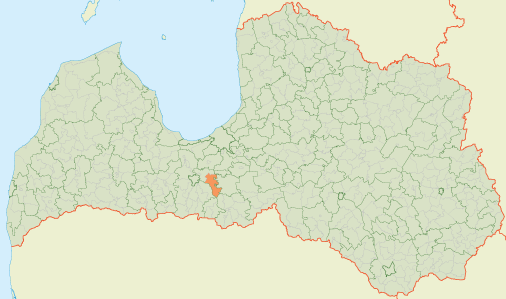
- Coordinates: 56°36′48″N 23°59′38″E
- Country: Latvia

Population (1 January 2026)
  - Total: 1,403

Salgale Parish (Latvian: Salgales pagasts; until 2011 - Sidrabene Parish, Sidrabenes pagasts) is an administrative unit of the Republic of Latvia and one of the 512 parishes that constitute today's Latvia. In a broader context, Salgale Parish is an integral part of Jelgava Municipality, which, in turn, is one of the constituent parts of the historical Latvian land of Semigallia (geographically, it is located north of the Daugava and south of the Saule region of Samogitia). Administratively, it is situated within Latvia's Zemgale Planning Region, one of the country's five planning regions.

== History ==
Until 1949, the parish was part of Dobele county (which was renamed Jelgava County in 1920, the same year Latvia achieved independence, following a more than a year and a half-long Latvian War of Independence). After Latvia successfully achieved sovereignty and independence from the Soviet Union in May 1990, it was once again renamed the Jelgava district. After the districts were abolished by the Saeima (Latvian parliament) in 2009, the Salgale Parish became a part of Ozolnieki Municipality, which was subsequently merged into Jelgava Municipality during the 2021 Latvian administrative reform.

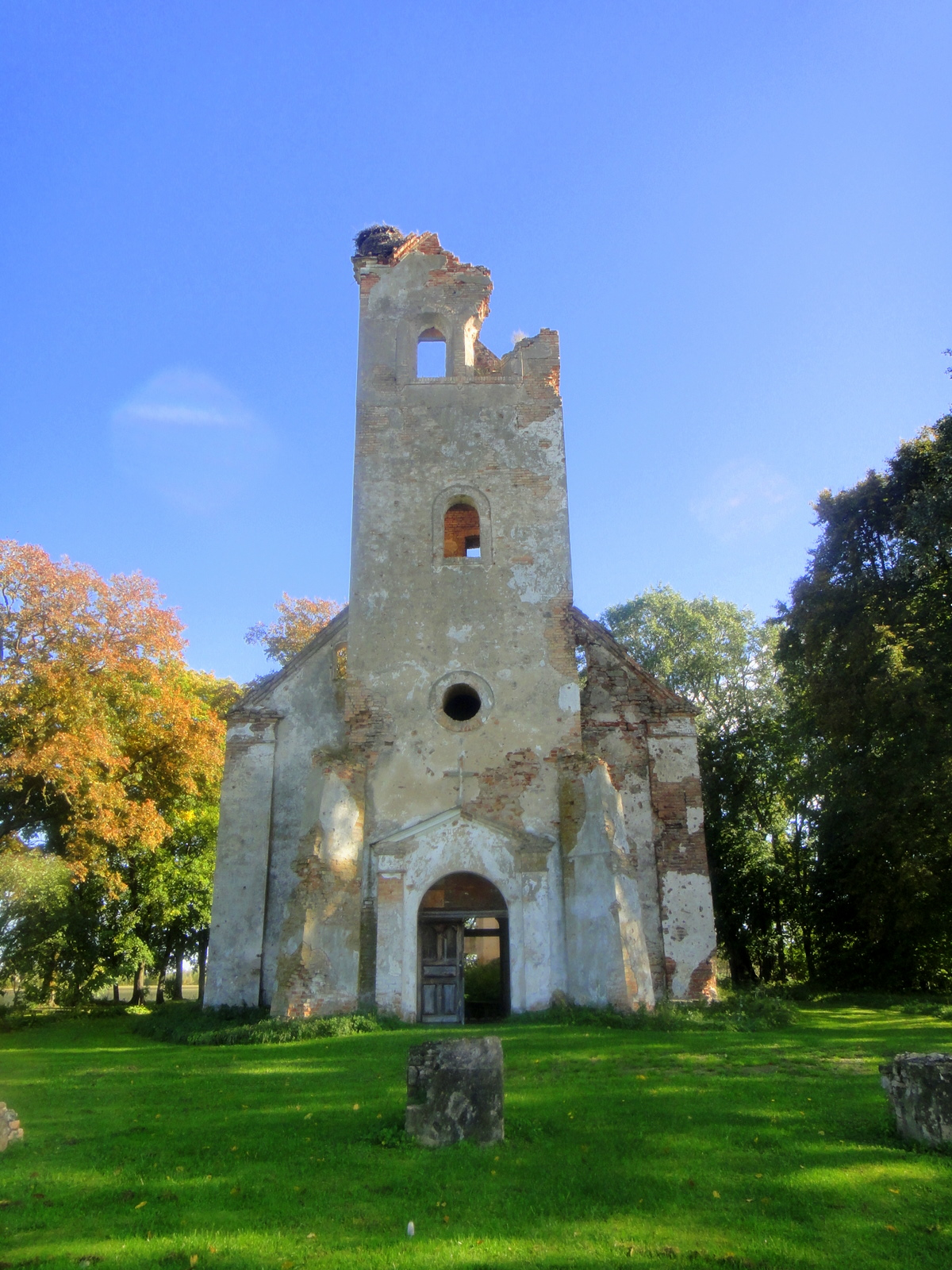
Ruins of Salgale lutheran church. Destroyed during WW2

== Villages of Salgale Parish ==
- Auči
- Emburga (parish centre)
- Garoza
- Ozolkalni
- Plāņi
- Purviņi
- Renceles
