= Garoza, Jelgava Municipality =

Village in Latvia

Garoza
- Village
- Sidrabene's location inside Latvia
- Coordinates: 56°37′37″N 23°56′22″E
- Country: Latvia
- Municipality: Jelgava
- Parish: Salgale

Population (2005)
  - Total: 335

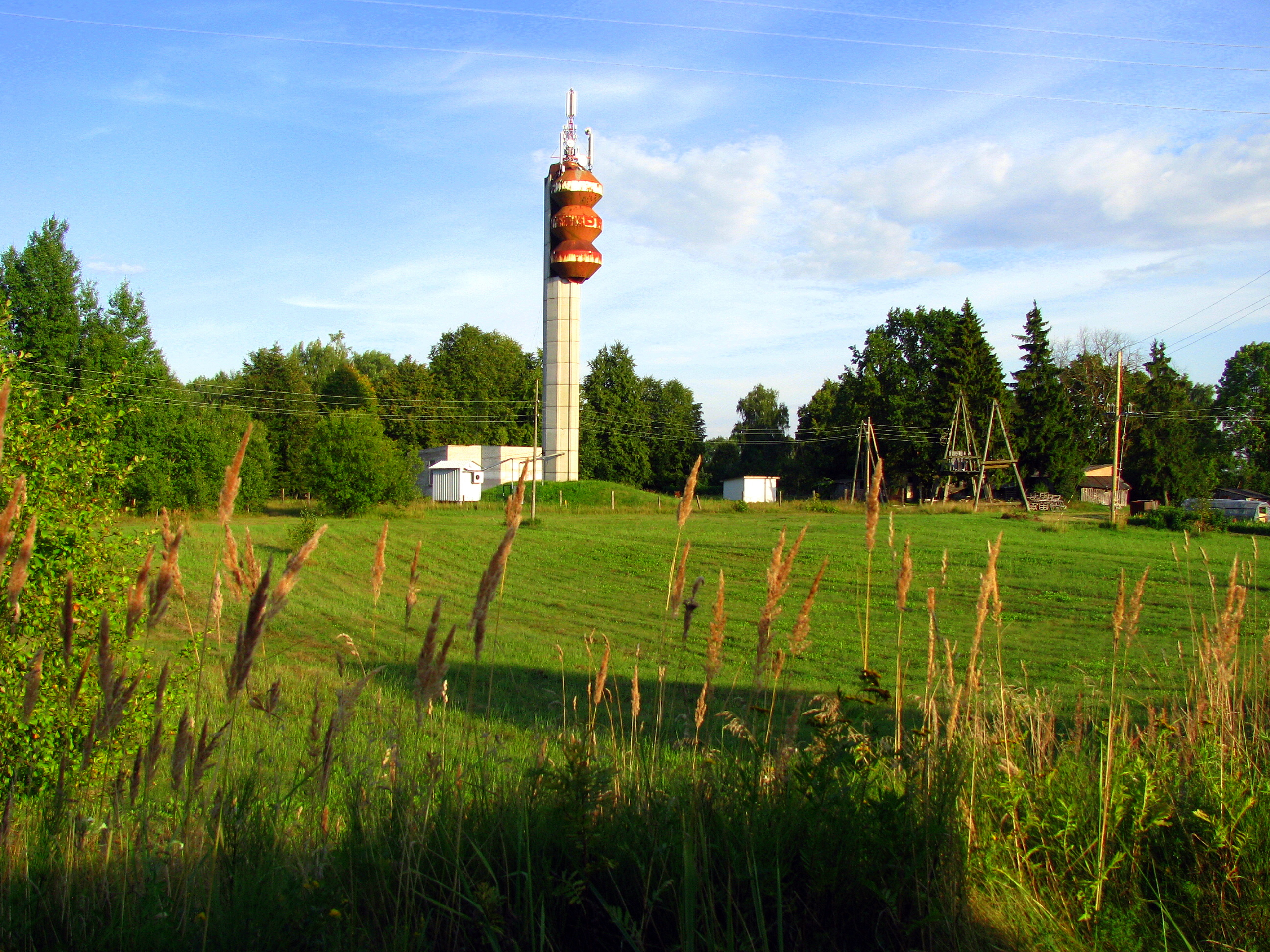
Garozas ūdenstornis, water tower at Garoza. August, 2015

Garoza is a village in Salgale Parish, Jelgava Municipality in the Semigallia region of Latvia (from 2009 until 2021, it was part of the former Ozolnieki Municipality). The village is located approximately 14 km from the city of Jelgava.

== See also ==
- Battle of Garoza
