= Jānis =

Male given name

- Gender: Male
- Name day: June 24

Origin
- Region of origin: Latvia

Other names
- Pet names: Jānītis, Jančuks, Jancis
- Related names: Janis, Žanis, Jani

Jānis is a Latvian masculine given name, the equivalent of the English John. The first written use of the name Jānis dates back to 1290. It may refer to:

- Jānis Ādamsons (born 1956), Latvian politician
- Jānis Akuraters (1876–1937), Latvian poet, writer, playwright and politician
- Jānis Andersons (born 1986), Latvian ice hockey defenceman
- Jānis Balodis (1881–1965), Latvian army general and politician
- Jānis Frīdrihs Baumanis (1834–1891), Latvian architect
- Jānis Bebris (1917–1969), Latvian footballer
- Jānis Beinarovičs (1907–1967), Latvian wrestler
- Jānis Bērziņš (1889–1938), Latvian and Soviet communist military official and politician
- Jānis Bērziņš (born 1993), Latvian basketball player
- Jānis Birks (born 1956), Latvian politician
- Jānis Blūms (born 1982), Latvian professional basketball player
- Jānis Bojārs (1956–2018), Latvian shot putter
- Jānis Brikmanis (1940–2019), Latvian zoologist, environmental conservationist, radio and television presenter, and writer
- Jānis Buivids (1864–1937), Latvian military general
- Jānis Bulis (born 1950), Latvian Roman Catholic bishop
- Jānis Čakste (1859–1927), Latvian politician and lawyer, former President of Latvia
- Jānis Cimze (1814–1881), Latvian pedagogue, collector and harmoniser of folk songs and organist
- Jānis Čoke (1878–1910), Latvian revolutionary and bank robber
- Jānis Daliņš (1904–1978), Latvian race walker and Olympic medalist
- Jānis Dimza (1906–c.1942), decathlete and Olympic competitor
- Jānis Doniņš (born 1946), Latvian javelin thrower
- Jānis Dreimanis (born 1949), Latvian football manager football defender
- Jānis Dūklavs (born 1952), Latvian politician
- Jānis Dukšinskis (born 1963), Latvian politician
- Jānis Eglītis (born 1961), Latvian politician
- Jānis Endzelīns (1873–1961), Latvian linguist
- Jānis Francis (1877–1956), Latvian army general
- Jānis Gailītis (born 1985), Latvian basketball player and coach
- Jānis Gilis (1943–2000), Latvian football manager
- Jānis Ikaunieks (1912–1969), Latvian astronomer
- Jānis Ikaunieks (born 1995), Latvian footballer
- Jānis Ilsters (1851–1889), Latvian botanist, teacher and folklore collector
- Jānis Ivanovs (1906–1983), Latvian classical music composer
- Jānis Jaks (born 1995), Latvian ice hockey player
- Jānis Jansons (born 1982), Latvian floorball player
- Jānis Jaunsudrabiņš (1877—1962), Latvian writer and painter
- Jānis Joņevs (born 1980), Latvian writer
- Jānis Judiņš (1884–1918), Latvian Riflemen commander and Red hero of the Russian Civil War
- Jānis Jurkāns (born 1946), Latvian politician
- Jānis Kalējs (born 1965), Latvian film director
- Jānis Kalmīte (1907–1996), Latvian expressionist painter
- Jānis Kalniņš (1904–2000), Latvian and Canadian composer
- Jānis Karlivāns (born 1982), Latvian decathlete and Olympic competitor
- Jānis Kaufmanis (born 1989), Latvian basketball player
- Jānis Ķipurs (born 1958), Latvian bobsledder and Olympic medalist
- Jānis Klovāns (1935–2010), Latvian chess Grandmaster
- Jānis Krūmiņš (1930–1994), Latvian basketball player
- Jānis Lagzdiņš (born 1952), Latvian politician
- Jānis Leitis (born 1989), Latvian long jumper
- Jānis Lidmanis (1910–1986), Latvian footballer and basketballer
- Jānis Liepiņš (1894–1964), Latvian painter
- Jānis Liepiņš (born 1988), Latvian conductor
- Jānis Lipke (1900–1987), Latvian rescuer of Jews during World War II
- Jānis Līvens (1884–????), was a Latvian cyclist and Olympic competitor
- Jānis Lūsis (1939–2020), Latvian javelin thrower and Olympic medalist
- Jānis Matulis (1911–1985), Latvian prelate of the Evangelical Lutheran Church of Latvia and Archbishop of Riga
- Jānis Medenis (1903–1961), Latvian poet and writer
- Jānis Mediņš (1890–1966), Latvian composer
- Jānis Miglavs (born 1948), Latvian-born American photographer and writer
- Jānis Miņins (born 1980), Latvian bobsledder
- Jānis Paipals (born 1983), Latvian cross-country skier and Olympic competitor
- Jānis Paukštello (born 1951), Latvian stage and film actor
- Jānis Pauļuks (1865–1937), Latvian politician, former Prime Minister of Latvia
- Jānis Pētersons (born 1995), Latvian singer (Citi Zēni)
- Jānis Pīnups (1925–2007), Latvian partisan
- Jānis Pliekšāns (aka Rainis) (1865–1929), Latvian poet, playwright, translator, and politician
- Jānis Podžus (born 1994), Latvian tennis player
- Jānis Polis (1938–2011), Latvian pharmacologist
- Jānis Porziņģis (born 1982), Latvian basketball player
- Jānis Pujats (born 1930), Latvian Roman Catholic archbishop emeritus of Riga
- Jānis Reinis (born 1960), Latvian stage and film actor
- Jānis Rinkus (born 1977), Latvian footballer
- Janis Rozentāls (1866–1916), Latvian painter
- Jānis Rozītis (1913–1942), Latvian football forward
- Jānis Rudzītis (1903–1967), Latvian wrestler and Olympic competitor
- Jānis Rudzutaks (1887–1938), Latvian Bolshevik revolutionary and Soviet politician
- Janis Skroderis (born 1983), Latvian professional tennis player
- Jānis Šmēdiņš (born 1987), Latvian beach volleyball player and Olympic competitor
- Jānis Šmits (born 1968), Latvian politician
- Jānis Sprukts (born 1982), Latvian professional ice hockey forward
- Jānis Straume (born 1962), Latvian politician
- Jānis Straupe (born 1989), Latvian ice hockey player
- Jānis Streičs (born 1936), Latvian film director
- Jānis Strēlnieks (born 1989), Latvian basketball player
- Jānis Strenga (born 1986), Latvian bobsledder
- Jānis Strupulis (born 1949), Latvian sculptor and graphic designer
- Jānis Sudrabkalns (1894–1975), Latvian poet and writer
- Jānis Tilbergs (1880–1972), Latvian painter and a sculptor
- Jānis Timma (1992–2024), Latvian basketball player
- Jānis Tutins (born 1966), Latvian politician
- Jānis Urbanovičs (born 1959), Latvian politician
- Jānis Vanags (born 1958), archbishop of the Evangelical Lutheran Church of Latvia
- Jānis Vilsons (1944–2018), Latvian handball player and Olympic competitor
- Jānis Vinters (born 1971), Latvian rally racing motorcycle rider
- Jānis Vītols (1911–1993), Latvian cyclist and Olympic competitor
- Jānis Vucāns (born 1956), Latvian politician and mathematician

== See also ==
- Janis (disambiguation)
- Jāņi
