= Latvian Puppet Theatre =

Puppet theatre in Riga, Latvia

- Latvijas Leļļu teātris
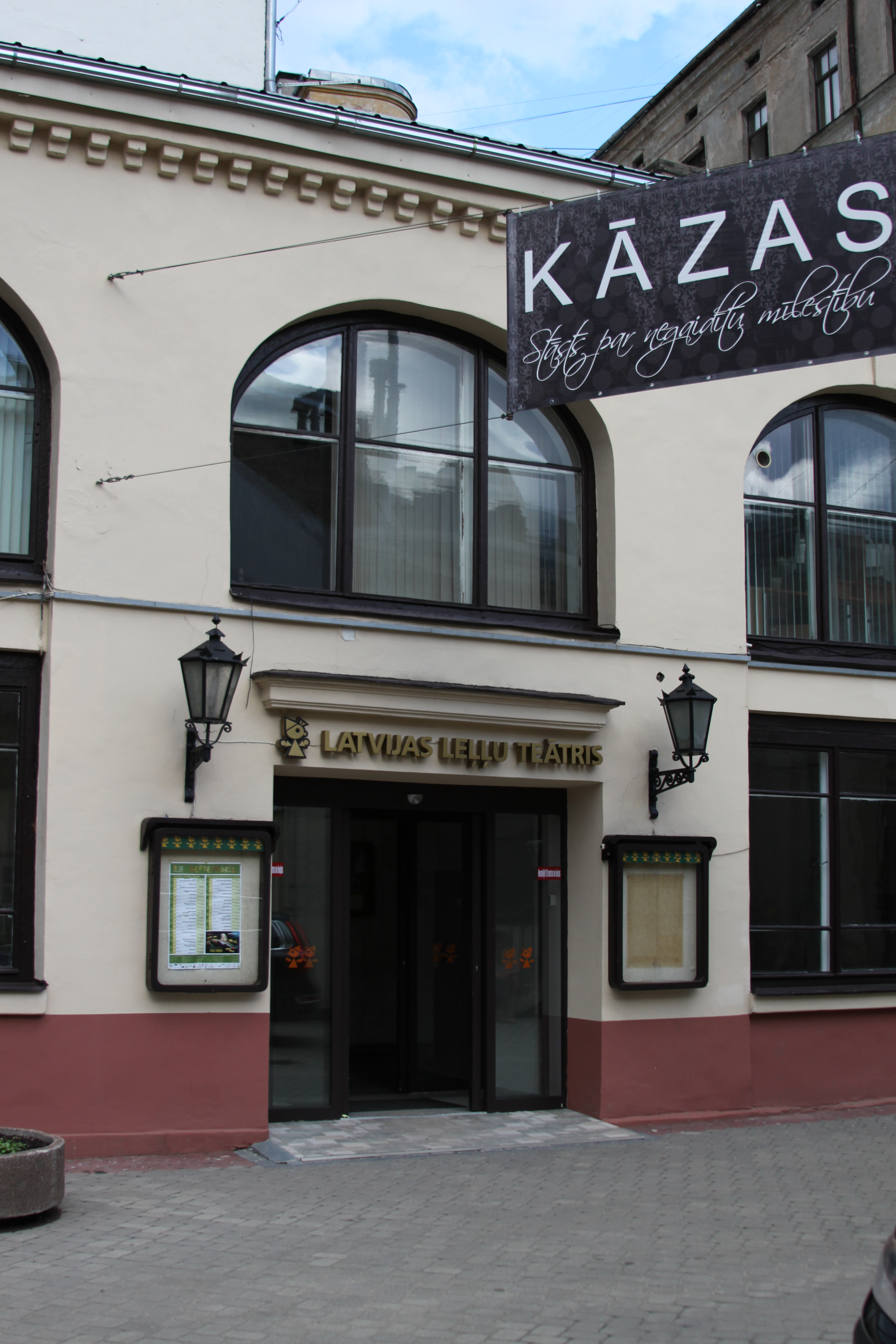
- The theatre building in 2010
- Interactive map of Latvian Puppet Theatre
- Address: Krišjāņa Barona iela 16/18; Riga; Latvia
- Coordinates: 56°57′4.14″N 24°7′18.03″E
- Type: Puppet theatre

Construction
- Opened: 4 October 1944

Website
- www.lelluteatris.lv/en/

The Latvian Puppet Theatre (Latvian: Latvijas Leļļu teātris) is a professional puppet theatre in Riga, Latvia. Founded on 4 October 1944, it was Latvia's first professional puppet theatre. Its repertoire uses traditional puppetry, object theatre, animation and other forms of visual theatre, with productions for children, young people and adults.

The theatre is based at Krišjāņa Barona iela 16/18 in central Riga. It is operated by VSIA Latvijas Leļļu teātris, a state-owned limited liability company, and is led by theatre director Mārtiņš Eihe, who took office in June 2022.

== History ==
=== Wartime formation and establishment ===
The theatre developed from a puppet group organised in 1942 within the Latvian SSR State Art Ensemble, which was then working in Ivanovo in the Russian SFSR. The group was led by poet Mirdza Ķempe and writer and translator Jānis Žīgurs, and performed for Latvian evacuees and soldiers during the Second World War.

Its first performance after returning to Latvia took place in Daugavpils on 3 October 1944. The following day, the Latvian SSR Arts Administration granted the ensemble the status of a professional state theatre. It moved to Riga in November 1944 and, after using several temporary venues, settled in the former Radio Modern cinema on Krišjāņa Barona Street.

=== Post-war artistic development ===
A Russian-language company was established in 1946. During the following decades, directors, designers and puppet makers including Arnolds Burovs, Tīna Hercberga, Pāvils Šenhofs, Alberts Terpilovskis and Anna Nollendorfa helped shape the theatre's artistic practice. Productions used glove and rod puppets, while directors and designers also combined puppetry with acting, music, film and other stage forms.

Šenhofs joined the theatre in 1946 and served as its chief designer from 1950 to 2000. During more than five decades at the theatre, he designed puppets and scenography for over 300 productions. Hercberga developed productions for adult audiences from the mid-1950s and later directed the experimental revue Interlellis-67 (1967), created with Šenhofs and playwright Gunārs Priede. The production used approximately 120 puppets and became a landmark in the theatre's history.

Other long-running productions included Un atkal Pifs... (Pif Again...), first staged in 1983. It remained in the repertoire for four decades.

=== After the restoration of Latvian independence ===
The institution was renamed the Latvian State Puppet Theatre in 1991 and adopted its current name in 2005. From the 1990s, productions were increasingly developed for more specific age groups, including preschool children, school-age audiences, teenagers and adults. The theatre also expanded its use of marionettes, sand animation, object theatre and collaborations with visiting directors.

During the closure of theatres in the COVID-19 pandemic, it opened a digital stage called Dīvānzāle in February 2021. The platform presented recordings and screen adaptations of productions in Latvian and Russian while the company continued preparing new work.

Eihe became the theatre's board member and director in 2022. Under his leadership, the theatre increased its emphasis on contemporary visual theatre, young directors and productions for teenage and adult audiences. Regular Russian-language performances ended in the 2023-24 season, while the theatre continued as a single Latvian-language company.

== Artistic profile and repertoire ==
The theatre works with glove, rod and string puppets, as well as object theatre, paper animation, live actors, movement, sound and projection. Its repertoire includes adaptations of Latvian and international literature, original works and productions that combine puppetry with other performing arts.

Contemporary productions have continued the theatre's earlier tradition of work for audiences beyond young children. Bez morāles. Ar lellēm (Without Morals. With Puppets, 2022) was created as a political cabaret for adults, while Jelgava '94 (2024), based on the novel by Jānis Joņevs, was made for teenage and adult audiences.

Valters Sīlis's production Sibīrijas haiku (Siberian Haiku, 2024), adapted from the graphic novel by Jurga Vilė and Lina Itagaki, used paper animation, projected drawings and live sound to present the history of Soviet deportations through a child's perspective. Theatre critic Ilze Kļaviņa described the production as balancing its visual form with the seriousness of its subject.

The theatre marked its 80th anniversary in 2024 with an exhibition devoted to Šenhofs and a production reflecting on the legacy of Hercberga and Interlellis-67.

== Building ==
The theatre's two-storey building at Krišjāņa Barona iela 16/18 was designed by architect Ernests Pole and built in 1911. It was not originally constructed as a theatre and accommodated several uses, including the Radio Modern cinema, workshops, shops and a small winter animal house. The puppet company moved into the former cinema premises after the Second World War, adapting the stage and adding an orchestra pit.

By the early 1980s, the building's technical condition had become critical. A major reconstruction began in 1990, during which the theatre operated from temporary premises. A later ownership dispute with the heirs of the pre-war owners ended in the theatre's favour in 2001.

The company again moved temporarily to the Riga Latvian Society building during a reconstruction from 2021 to 2023. The project strengthened the historic structure, improved energy efficiency and accessibility, renewed technical systems and raised the ceiling of the small auditorium. The building was commissioned in November 2023, and performances resumed there on 15 December. The construction work cost approximately €4.13 million excluding value-added tax.

== International activity ==
The theatre has toured internationally and participated in puppet-theatre festivals in Europe and elsewhere. It hosted the seventh Festival of Puppet Theatres of the Baltic States and the Byelorussian SSR in 1986 and the ninth Baltic Sea States puppet-theatre festival in 1999.

In 2026, the theatre organised the third Baltic Visual Theatre Showcase, held in Latvia for the first time. The programme brought together puppet, object, physical and interdisciplinary visual-theatre productions from Latvia, Lithuania, Estonia and Finland for public audiences and international theatre professionals.
