= Victory Memorial (Krasny Sulin) =

Coordinates: 47.8928°N 40.0631°E

- Russian: Мемориал "Победа"
- Interactive map of Victory Memorial
- Location: Krasny Sulin, Rostov Oblast, Russia
- Designer: Zanis, sculptor VD Batyai
- Opening date: 1975

Victory Memorial is a memorial complex in the city of Krasny Sulin, Rostov Region. It was opened on April 25, 1975. It includes a stele, an eternal light, a monument to a Soviet soldier, an alley of heroes.

== History ==
During the Great Patriotic War, on July 21, 1942, Soviet troops left the city which was occupied by German troops.

On February 14, 1943, Krasny Sulin was liberated from Nazi German troops by Soviet troops of the 5th Panzer Army of the South-Western Front during the Voroshilovgrad operation. The occupation of Krasniy Sulin lasted seven months (July 21, 1942 – February 14, 1943). During the occupation, the Germans tortured and shot more than 400 residents of the city.

Memorial "Victory" with eternal light was installed on April 25, 1975 near the Palace of Culture of Metallurgists on Victory Square by residents of the city of Krasny Sulin in commemoration of the 30th anniversary of the Victory of the Soviet people in the Great Patriotic War, in honor of city residents who did not return from the Patriotic War. The authors of the memorial project were Zanis, sculptor VD Batyai.

A 6-meter sculpture of the memorial depicts a warrior with a gun in his hands. The warrior tears the ribbon of victory with his body. Next to the pedestal is a stele, lined with marble tiles and an eternal flame. The words from R. Rozhdestvensky's poem "Requiem" "... people! As long as hearts are knocking, remember: what price has happiness been won – please, remember! " are written on the stele.

On the marble pylons of the alley of glory the bas-reliefs of Heroes of the Soviet Union are fixed: Alekseyev AI, Galatova AM, Dernova PS, Kalinina FA, Kornienko IM, Kravtsova AS, Prosandeyeva IK, Sidorina VN, Omelchenko IA, Chistova IA and full cavalier of the Order of Glory Samokhin VF

In 2000, on the eve of the 55th anniversary of the Victory, the monument was restored.
