= Dangerous Summer =

Dangerous Summer may refer to:

- A Dangerous Summer, a 1982 Australian film
- Dangerous Summer (film), a 2000 Latvian film
- The Dangerous Summer, a 1985 nonfiction book by Ernest Hemingway
- The Dangerous Summer (band), an American rock band, or a 2018 album by the band
- Dangerous Summer (EP), a 2025 extended play by Yeat
