= Arnis Līcītis =

Latvian actor (1946–2022)

- Born: 8 January 1946; Riga, Latvian SSR, Soviet Union
- Died: 21 January 2022 (aged 76)
- Education: Jāzeps Vītols Latvian Academy of Music
- Occupation: Actor
- Years active: 1965–2022

Arnis Līcītis (8 January 1946 – 21 January 2022) was a Latvian actor.

== Life and career ==
Born in Riga in 1946, Līcītis was the son of actors Alfrēds Videnieks and Helga Līcīte. He attended secondary school at Riga State Gymnasium No.1 and subsequently graduated from the Jāzeps Vītols Latvian Academy of Music. He became an actor in the troupes of the Latvian National Theatre, the Valmiera Drama Theatre, the Latvijas PSR Valsts Jaunatnes teātris, and the Riga Russian Theatre. He then began working for the Riga Film Studio in 1965.

Līcītis died on 21 January 2022, at the age of 76.

== Filmography ==
- Sūtņu sazvērestība (1965)
- Ceļa zīmes (1968)
- Egle rudzu laukā (1972)
- Uzbrukums slepenpolicijai (1974)
- The Favorite (1976)
- Trīs dienas pārdomām (1980)
- Long Road in the Dunes (1981)
- Mirāža (1983)
- Mans draugs Sokrātiņš (1984)
- Aveņu vīns (1984)
- Svešais (1988)
- Barons of Crime (1988)
- Depresija (1991)
- Musketeers Twenty Years After (1992)
- Dangerous Summer (2000)
