= Certificate of Maturity =

- Russian: Аттестат зрелости
- Directed by: Tatyana Lukashevich
- Written by: Liya Geraskina
- Produced by: Vladimir Aggeev
- Starring: Vasily Lanovoy; Vadim Grachyov; Galina Lyapina; Tamara Kirsanova; Aleksandr Susnin; Vladimir Andreyev
- Cinematography: Semyon Sheynin
- Edited by: G. Slavatinskaya
- Music by: Lev Shvarts
- Production company: Mosfilm
- Release date: 1954
- Running time: 106 min.
- Country: Soviet Union
- Language: Russian

Certificate of Maturity (Russian: Аттестат зрелости, romanized: Attestat zrelosti) is a 1954 Soviet drama film directed by Tatyana Lukashevich. This was Antonina Bogdanova's debut film.

== Plot ==
Gifted, but spoiled by the adoration of teachers and classmates, the young hero of the picture provokes a conflict at school. But friends on time pointed out the guy to the incorrectness of his behavior, and the general pet was punished by the force of collective indignation.

== Cast ==
- Vasily Lanovoy as Valentin Listovsky
- Vadim Grachyov as Zhenya Kuznetsov
- Galina Lyapina as Vika
- Tamara Kirsanova as Klava
- Aleksandr Susnin as Vanya Andreyev
- Vladimir Andreyev as Yurka
- Yuri Krotenko as Kostya
- Viktor Geraskin as Gera Grazhdankin
- Georgi Chernovolenko as Boris Grotokhov
- Tatyana Lennikova as Antonina Yakovleva
- Leonid Gallis as head teacher
- Vladimir Yemelyanov as Valentin's father
- Lyudmila Skopina as Kuznetsova
- Vladimir Kenigson as Pyotr Strakhov
- Vladimir Dorofeyev as Uncle Vanya
- Tatyana Pelttser as janitor
- Lev Borisov as Korobov
- Roza Makagonova as Cinderella
- Vladimir Zemlyanikin as Dobchinsky
