= Bēne Manor =

Manor house in Zemgale, Latvia

- Bēnes muiža
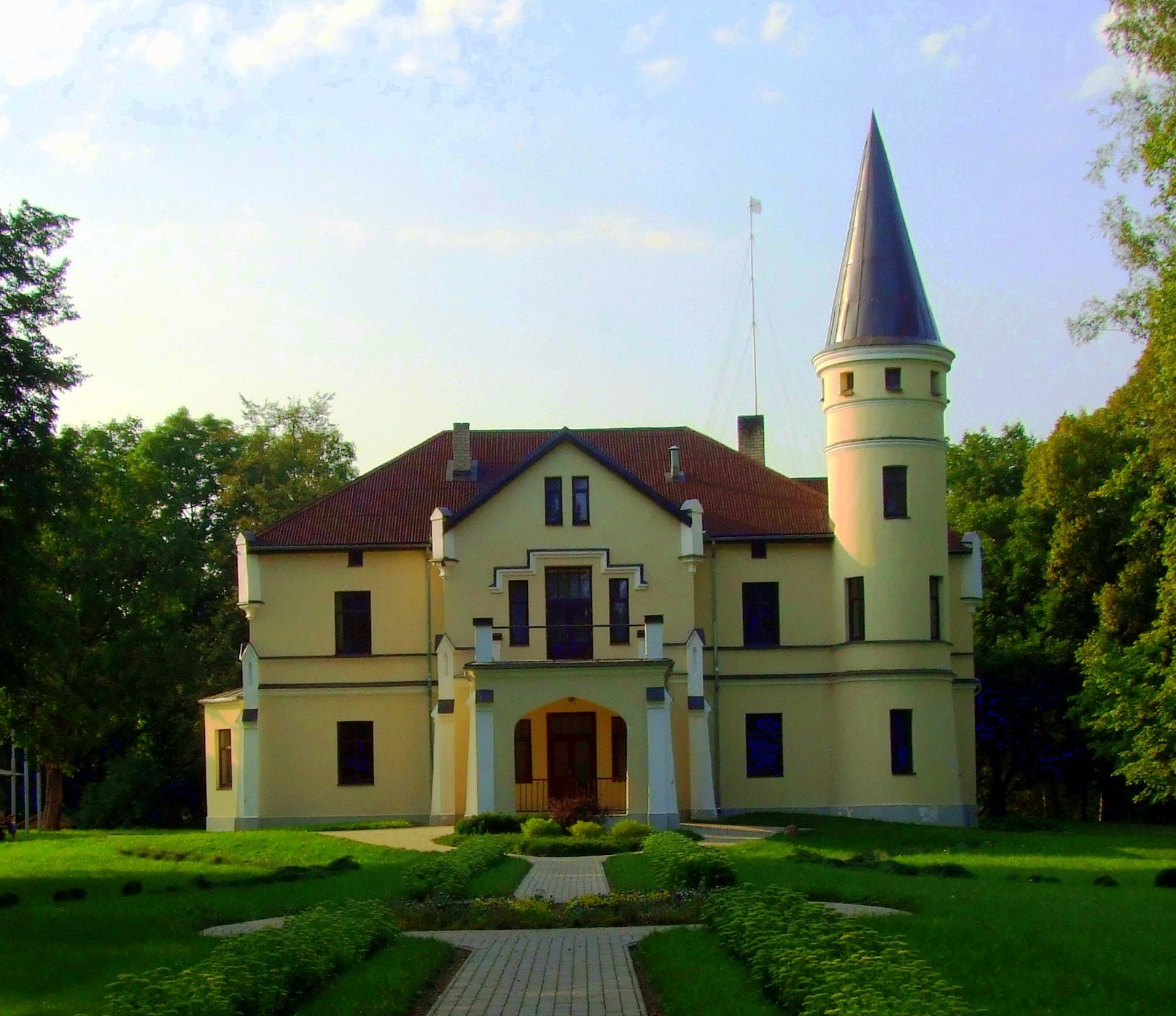

- Location within Latvia

General information
- Architectural style: Neo-Gothic
- Location: Bēne Parish, Dobele Municipality, Latvia
- Coordinates: 56°29′7″N 23°3′48″E
- Construction started: 1876
- Completed: 1878
- Client: August von der Recke

Design and construction
- Architect: Ivan Schlupp

Bēne Manor (German: Gut Behnen; Latvian: Bēnes muiža) is a manor house in the Bēne Parish of Dobele Municipality in the Semigallia region of Latvia. Bēne manor was established at the end of the 16th century, upon the collapse of the Livonian Order and the formation of the Duchy of Courland and Semigallia.

== History ==
Bēne Manor was established in the late 16th century, after the collapse of the Livonian Order. When the Duchy of Courland and Semigallia was formed, Manor was created on the lands cultivated by the advisor to the Courland ruler Dr. Berg. In 1597 he received the county he had already acquired from the Duke Friedrich for use, along with the rights to use timber and firewood from the crown forest. King of Poland Władysław IV Vasa in 1633 made a final designation of property ownership.

At the beginning of the 19th century, lands in Auce Municipality belonged to the Medem noble family. Count Friedrich von Medem owned the palaces of Vecauce and Eleja, as well as the manors of Bēne, Jaunauce, Ķevele and Vītiņi. In 1873 Jelgava-Mažeikiai railway was opened. At that time, the owner of the Bēne Manor was Baron August von der Reck. The last owner of the Bēne Manor house was Friedrich von Birckenstaedt. The land of the manor was divided among the young farmers and part of the Bēne manor was rented out. From 1922 manor tenant was Otto Valdemārs Gailītis. The ruined and desolate farm, which was then called the Cultural Center of Bēne, was transformed into a model farm, receiving government awards. On his initiative, he started sugar beet growing, established the most modern dairy in the Baltic States and began electrification of Bēne.

== See also ==
- List of palaces and manor houses in Latvia
