= Ilsteria =

Scientific classification
- Domain: Eukaryota
- Clade: Sar
- Clade: Stramenopiles
- Division: Ochrophyta
- Class: Xanthophyceae
- Order: Mischococcales
- Family: Botryochloridaceae
- Genus: Ilsteria; Skuja & Pascher, 1938

Species
- Ilsteria lobata Pascher; Ilsteria pseudotetracoccus Kostikov; Ilsteria quadrijuncta Skuja; Ilsteria tetracoccus Pascher

Algae genus

Ilsteria is a genus of algae from the yellow-green algae class. It is a colonial organism, generally consisting of four or – sometimes – two cells. This genus is named after a Latvian botanist, teacher and poet Jānis Ilsters (1851–1889).

== Species ==
There are four currently recognized species of algae in the genus Ilsteria that are distinguished based on cell dimensions and the morphology and number of chloroplasts, which can be either single or ranging from four to twelve in a single algae cell.
