= Jānis Ilsters =

Latvian botanist, teacher, and poet (1851–1889)

- Born: 14 May 1851; Gretes (house), Vestiena parish (now within Madona municipality), Latvia
- Died: 5 May 1889 (aged 37); Gretes (house), Vestiena parish, Latvia
- Resting place: Vestiena Old Graveyard
- Scientific career
- Fields: Biology; Botany

Jānis Ilsters (14 May 1851 (Note: Jānis Ilsters was born in 1851 on 2 May (Julian calendar) or 14 May according to the Gregorian calendar.) – 5 May 1889) was a Latvian botanist autodidact, teacher, folklore collector and poet. Often cited as the "first Latvian botanist" as he has written the first textbook of botany in Latvian "Botany for common schools and self-study. Elementary course." ("Botānika tautskolām un pašmācībai. Elementārkurss."). He has published some works under the pseudonym "Daugavietis" (from Latvian: "[a person] of Daugava").

Ilsters is known for his contribution in the development of botanical terminology in Latvian, introducing such terms as "suga" (species) and "valsts" (kingdom), as well as finding and documenting around 500 Latvian names of plant species. His herbarium contains 1300 leaves, which now reside in the Latvian Museum of Natural History and Botanical and mycological collection of University of Latvia.

== Life ==
=== Early life ===
Ilsters was born in Gretes house, Vestiena parish, nowadays belonging to Madona municipality, on May 14, 1851 as the second child in the family having a total number of seven siblings, namely sisters Anna, Karlīne and Ede, and brothers Atis, Kārlis and Viļums. It is known that Viļums' daughter Tekla Ilstere (Note: Some sources mention Tekla's name as Tikla.) (1904–1983) was a composer and a choir conductor.

He was educated at the Lutheran school of Ērgļi parish during the period 1864–1868. In 1871, Ilsters completed his exam in Cēsis, qualifying him as a "parish-schoolteacher". Other necessary knowledge Ilsters gained by self-study.

=== Work and employment ===
In 1870, Ilsters started working as a tutor in a German colony of Irši (Iršu kolonija, or also Liepkalnes kolonija), in Irši manor (Iršu muiža, in German – Hirschenhof). Here, working for Ūzani house owner Asmus, Ilsters wrote a line in his notes: "There is quite a lot of work, but I am feeling content, without a worry, but a joyful mind." He worked there until 1872.

In 1873, Ilsters used his qualification to apply for a job in Vestiena parish school, where he worked as a teaching assistant. During this time, the journalist, bibliographer and folklore collector Matīss Ārons (also known as Āronu Matīss), who later went on to write Ilsters' biography and Ilsters' unpublished works, was gaining his education as a pupil. The correspondence between Ilsters and Ārons is preserved in the academical library of University of Latvia.

In the years between 1875–1876 and 1878–1882, Ilsters worked as a teacher in the Residential Child Care Community of Ozolaine, also called Eihenheim (Ozolaines jeb Eihenheimas bērnu patversme) in Sarkandaugava neighbourhood of Riga. In the winter between the years 1876–1877, he taught at Liezēre parish school, where he gained positive feedback from pupils and their parents.

Overall, Ilsters' teaching methods were reported to have a scientific approach to studies, including precise terminology, while also making it entertaining for children. He started collecting folklore about nature to improve students' creative thinking and their motivation to study, as well as the respect for nature and history. In his first textbook, he included some folk material too – traditional uses of medicinal plants.

Ilsters also worked in Stukmaņi (nowadays – Pļaviņas) as a tutor (1882–1885) and as an accountant and correspondent (1885–1888), and during this time of stay, he developed a guidemap of Daugava river valley from Stukmaņi to Koknese. Other notable places of employment include his job in "Rota" ("Ornament") magazine, as well as participation in Latvian Association of Riga (nowadays reestablished) and Natural Researcher Association of Riga (discontinued).

After the bankruptcy of "Rota" magazine, Ilsters was planning to establish his own magazine "Latvijas Zemkopis" ("Latvian Agriculturist"). Ilsters wrote enough material for the first two magazine issues, but never got to publish it because of his health issues, and instead returned home.

== Death ==
Jānis Ilsters died from an unknown heart condition at the age of 37, in his family house Gretes. For a year until his death, he continued teaching children of his family and relatives. Ilsters' memorial was erected on May 23, 1973, in Gretes. On May 27, 2013, the memorial was renewed.

Latvian algologist Heinrich Skuja commemorated his name by including Ilsters' surname in his newly discovered representative of Ilsteria genus – Ilsteria quadrijuncta. Two algae species from different genus Skuja also distinguished by using Ilsters' surname, namely Oedogonium ilsteri and Tetrarcus ilsteri.

In memoriam, Vestiena parish's coat of arms includes a plant from Ilsters' first textbook – the common hepatica.

== Legacy ==
=== Legacy in biology ===
Ilsters has published 41 scientific and educational works, as well as magazine publishings about agriculture, pedagogy, folklore and regional studies. He has collected 18 herbarium volumes called "Flora Baltica", most of which consisted of plants of Daugava valley. Asides botanical terminology, Ilsters was developing zoological terminology and a list of Latvian birds, which remains handwritten and unfinished.

In his works, Ilsters paid attention to the natural and artificial migration route impact on the development of Latvian flora, especially alongside Daugava river valley. His researches mostly focused on adventive species of Latvia, phenology, and local flora.

=== Folklore preservation ===
A notable part of Ilsters' work consisted of his contribution to the collection of folklore, resulting in 865 dainas for the Krišjānis Barons' collection "Latvju Dainas" ("Latvian Dainas"), 32 teikas (folkstories) for Ansis Lerhis-Puškaitis' compilation "Latviešu tautas teikas un pasakas" ("Latvian folk stories and fairytales"), and 40 folk beliefs (non-religious superstitions) forwarded to Pēteris Šmits' "Latviešu tautas ticējumi" ("Latvian folk beliefs"). After his death, Ilsters' other works were saved by Āronu Matīss, which resulted in Ilsters' poem and poem translation book "Sīkrozītes, magonītes jeb dzejas ziediņi" ("Daisies, poppies or poem flowers"), published in 1889.
