= Oļegs un Aina =

1973 film by Aleksandrs Leimanis

- Directed by: Aleksandrs Leimanis
- Music by: Ivars Vīgners
- Production company: Riga Film Studio
- Release date: 1973
- Running time: 73 minutes
- Country: Latvian SSR
- Language: Russian

Oļegs un Aina is a 1973 Soviet television feature film. The film was directed by Aleksandrs Leimanis.

== Cast ==
- Anatolijs Gračovs — Oļeg
- Lilita Ozoliņa — Aina
- Rolands Zagorskis — Andris
- Aleksandrs Bojarskis — Žarkovskis
- Velta Līne — Oļeg’s mother
- Uldis Dumpis — Eduards
- Jānis Grantiņš — Pēteris
- Elza Radziņa — Aina’s mother
