= Elza Radziņa =

Latvian actress

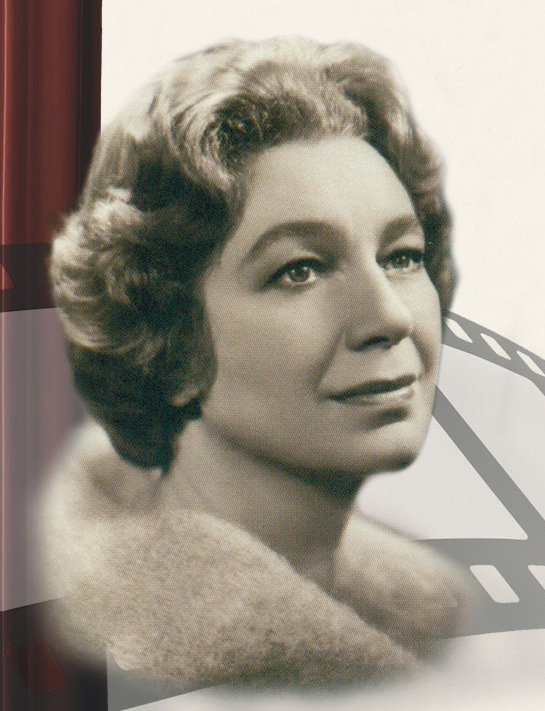
- Elza Radziņa
- Born: Elza Katrina Podniece; 10 February 1917; Kharkiv, Russian Empire
- Died: 18 August 2005 (aged 88); Riga, Latvia
- Occupation: Actress
- Years active: 1936–2004
- Spouse: Kārlis Radziņš (m. 1941–1958) Oļģerts Šalkonis (m. 1958–2005)
- Children: 1

Elza Radziņa (10 February 1917 – 18 August 2005) was a Soviet Latvian theater and cinema actress, and a master of the spoken word (reader). She received People's Artist of the USSR award in 1976 and the Order of the Three Stars in 1995.

She studied at the Jelgava Theater Studio in 1942. After World War II, she worked at the Jelgava Drama theater (1945-1953). She briefly worked at the Valmiera Drama Theatre, but from 1954, she worked at the Latvian National Theatre, where she became one of its leading actresses.

In 1949, she made her debut in the biographical drama film "Rainis," produced by the Riga Film Studio.

== Work ==
=== Stage ===
- 1958: Filumēna Martorano as Filumēna
- 1962: Mīļais Melis as Stella Kempbela
- 1969: Vasara Noānā as baroness Orora Didevāna
- 1971: Lilioms as Muškātne
- 1972: Paši pūta, paši dega as Auguste Biezais
- 1975: Fedra as Fedra
- 1980: Mērnieku laiki as Annuža
- 1987: Lampu drudzis as Dotija Otlija
- 1990: Bezkaunīgie veči as Zuzanna Bertolde
- 1996: Zaļā zeme as Līču māte
- 1998: Pilnos auļos as Diāna Vrīlande

=== Filmography ===
- Hamlet (1964) as Gertrude
- Purva bridējs (1996) as Madam Horst.
- Viimne reliikvia (1969) as Abtiss
- The Devil's Servants (1970) as Gertrude
- King Lear (1971) as Goneril
- The Devil's Servants at the Devil's Mill (1972) as Gertrude
- Oļegs un Aina (1973) as Aina's mother
- The Favorite (1976) as Auntie Debb Penn
- Death by Sailing (1976) as Mrs. Tufts
- Teātris (1978) as Dolly
