= Whose Are You, Old People? =

- Russian: Вы чьё, старичьё?
- Directed by: Iosif Kheifits
- Written by: Iosif Kheifits; Boris Vasilyev
- Starring: Mikhail Pakhomenko; Lev Borisov; Elena Melnikova; Yevgeny Kryzhanovsky; Tatyana Sharkova
- Cinematography: Yuri Shaygardanov
- Edited by: Raisa Izakson; Avie Schneidman
- Music by: Isaac Schwartz
- Production company: Lenfilm
- Release date: 1988
- Running time: 99 min.
- Country: Soviet Union
- Language: Russian

Whose Are You, Old People? (Russian: Вы чьё, старичьё?, romanized: Vy chyo, starichyo?) is a 1988 Soviet drama film directed by Iosif Kheifits. The film tells about two lonely old people living in one village.

== Plot ==
The story centers on the lives of two lonely elderly men, forgotten and abandoned by everyone in the bustle of everyday life.

After his wife passes away, Kasyan Nefyodovich Glushkov, a village resident, moves to the city to live with his daughter-in-law, as his son died several years prior. She lives in a communal apartment with her young son, dreaming of finding a well-paying job, buying a home, and remarrying. When her job search in the city proves futile, she is forced to leave for work in the north, leaving Kasyan with his grandson, though the child is soon taken to join his mother. The neighbors, who are expecting a baby, hint that it would be best if Kasyan vacates the space.

Meanwhile, Kasyan, while collecting bottles, meets Bagorych, a local retiree living in a one-room apartment with his adult granddaughter, Valentina. Valentina’s fiancé, Andrei, returns after four years in a prison camp. Feeling out of place, Kasyan and Bagorych plan to go to Kasyan’s village, where his childhood friend Nyura (Anna Semyonovna) has found them work and invited them to stay. However, on the day they are set to leave, Kasyan receives a telegram saying Nyura has died.

Kasyan and Bagorych walk along the railroad tracks into the unknown, unaware that it was Nyura’s lonely daughter, a postal worker who sent the telegram because she didn’t want two elderly men living in her house.

The film’s structure is cyclical: both the beginning and end feature a village scene of a herdsman driving cattle to pasture, listening to a Vladimir Vysotsky song on his tape recorder.

== Cast ==
- Mikhail Pakhomenko as Kasyan Glushkov
- Lev Borisov as Bagorych
- Elena Melnikova as Valentina, Bagorych's granddaughter
- Yevgeny Kryzhanovsky as Arnold, neighbor in a communal apartment (as Yevgeni Krzhizhanovsky)
- Tatyana Sharkova as Zinka, Kasyan's daughter-in-law
- Yevgeniya Kovalyova as Nyura, neighbor in the village
- Irina Rakshina as Vera, Nyura's daughter
- Anatoliy Kotenyov as Andrey
- Valentin Bukin as Podkhodtsev
- Yuri Golubev as Golubev
