= Afanasi Trishkin =

Soviet and Russian actor

- Born: Afanasi Petrovich Trishkin; 4 June 1934; Kaluga Oblast, RSFSR, USSR
- Died: 13 October 2024 (aged 90); Moscow, Russia
- Resting place: Khovanskoye Cemetery
- Occupation: Actor
- Years active: 1964–2024
- Awards: Honored Artist of Russia (2003)

Afanasi Petrovich Trishkin (Russian: Афанасий Петрович Тришкин; June 4, 1934 webarchive – October 13, 2024) was a Soviet and Russian film and theater actor. He is an Honored Artist of Russia (2003).

== Biography ==
Afanasi Trishkin was born on June 4, 1934, in Pesochnya (now Kirov, Kaluga Oblast, Russia). In 1959 he graduated from Bryansk State Technical University. In 1964 he began his artistic career at Krasnoyarsk Dramatic Theater. In 1973 he was invited to a minor role in the film Engineer Pronchatov by Igor Vasiliev. Later, Vasiliev invited Trishkin to the play Cinzano, based on the text of Lyudmila Petrushevskaya.

The performance began to be rehearsed at Sovremennik Theater, using a certain period of administrative and creative, semi-legal confusion, including: Oleg Dal, Valentin Nikulin, Afanasi Trishkin. However, soon the rehearsals were stopped by order of the director of the theater. . Unable to find work in Moscow, Afanasi Trishkin moved to Kishinev, where he worked at the film actor and studied at the film studio Moldova-Film. Removed in dozens of paintings from these and other studies, mainly in adventure strips.

In 2003 he received the honorary title of Honored Artist of Russia.

In recent years, it is in the Near the House of Stanislavsky Theatre. He took part in the work Yesterday Came Suddenly. Winnie-the-Pooh, Or Good-bye, Beatles — acute social drama, which played the role of the elder Christopher Robin.

== Filmography ==
- The Favorite (1976) as bandit
- That Side Where the Wind (1978) as Ivan Sergeevich
- A Hunting Accident (1978) as doctor (uncredited)
- Dangerous Friends (1979) as professor
- Broken Sky (1979) as Captain counterintelligence
- Who will pay for Luck? (1980) as Kovel
- The Brothers Rico (1980) as Rosenberg
- December 20 (1981) as Razum
- Agony (1981) as Maklakov
- Snowdrops and Edelweiss (1982) as Weber
- Anna Pavlova (1983) as Sergeyev
- La Caza del dragón (1986) as episode
- Vagrant Bus (1990) as Ivan Ivanovich Daganovsky
- Presence (1993) as port worker
- Wolfhound (2006) as Varokh
