= Doom 94 =

2018 novel by Jānis Joņevs

- First edition (Latvian)
- Author: Jānis Joņevs
- Genre: Semi-biographical novel
- Publisher: Wrecking Ball Press {English translation)
- Publication date: 2013
- Publication place: Latvia
- Pages: 312
- ISBN: 9789934872846

Doom 94 (Latvian: Jelgava 94) is a semi-biographical novel by Latvian writer Jānis Joņevs about the generation living in Jelgava, Latvia, in the 1990s that searches for their own identity and are fans of alternative culture. This is his debut novel. Since 2016, this book has been translated into 11 languages and a movie was released in September 2019.

== Plot ==
The novel begins on April 5, 1994, the death of Kurt Cobain, the lead singer and guitarist of Nirvana. Cobain's death influences youngsters living in Jelgava, Latvia, to begin listening to heavy metal music. This is also the time that Latvia has recently regained its independence from the Soviet Union, causing economic and social upheaval. The book's main character Jānis turns to the alternative lifestyle offered by an emergent heavy metal scene.

== Translations ==
Since 2016 the original book Jelgava 94 has already been translated into 11 languages – French, Slovenian, Norwegian, Estonian, Hungarian, Lithuanian, English, Bulgarian, Spanish, German and Finnish.

Translations of the ''Doom 94'' book
Language	Title	Publisher	Translator	Year of release
French	"Metal"	GAIA Editions	Nicolas Auzanneau	2016
Slovenian	"Metalci ‘94"	Miš	Jedrt Lapuh Maležič	2016
Norwegian	"Fordømte 94"	Bokbyen Forlag	Snorre Karkonen-Svensson	2016
Estonian	"Jelgava 94"	Randvelt	Mikk Grīns	2017
Lithuanian	"Jelgava 94"	Kitos knygos	Jurgis Algimantas Banevičius	2018
Hungarian	"Metál"	Vince Kiadó	Tölgyesi Beatrix	2018
English	"Doom 94"	Wrecking Ball Press	Kaija Straumanis	2018
Bulgarian	"Йелгава 94"	Izida	Albena Metodieva	2018
Spanish	"Jelgava"	Abismos casa editorial	Ana Karenina O. Contreras	2020
German	"Jelgava 94"	parasitenpresse	Bettina Bergmann	2022
Finnish	"Doom 94"	Siltala	Annika Suna	2022

== Awards ==
=== 2014 ===
- European Union Prize for Literature
- Annual Latvian Literature Award in category "Best Debut’’
- Latvian National Television award "Kilograms kultūras" (Kilogram of Culture)
- Latvian National Library Children and Young Adults Jury award, 15+ category
- Bookshop chain's "Jānis Roze" most sold book of 2014

=== 2015 ===
- AKKA/LAA "Author award of 2015"

== Film ==
Work on a film adaptation of the book called Jelgava 94 began in 2017. The film was released in September 2019. Movie scenes were filmed in many locations throughout Riga and Jelgava, and at a former school in Priekuļi Municipality. The main actor was Bruno Bitenieks who was a student at Riga Teika Secondary School. The film received funding from the National Film Center and was supported by the Administration of Jelgava Municipality. The film was produced by Jura Podnieka studija.

Scriptwriter	Matīss Gricmanis
Cinematographer	Aigars Sērmukšs
Production designer	Aivars Žukovskis
Producer	Antra Cilinska
