= Lilita Ozoliņa =

Latvian actress (1947–2023)

- Ozoliņa in Long Road in the Dunes (1980)
- Born: 19 November 1947; Riga, Latvian SSR, USSR
- Died: 5 June 2023 (aged 75)
- Education: Jāzeps Vītols Latvian Academy of Music
- Occupation: Actress

Lilita Ozoliņa (19 November 1947 – 5 June 2023) was a Latvian actress.

== Biography ==
Born in Riga on 19 November 1947, she was the daughter of film director Albertīna Ozoliņa and test pilot Arvīds Ozoliņš. She attended acting classes taught by Aloizs Brenčs and Līvija Akurātere at the Riga Film Studio. She also worked at the Dailes Theatre, where she spent her entire career. She rose to fame after her role as Marta Ozola in the 1981 film Long Road in the Dunes. On 14 October 2013, she was awarded a "Baltic Star" in Saint Petersburg.

Lilita Ozoliņa died on 5 June 2023, at the age of 75.

== Filmography ==
- When the Rain and Wind Knock at the Window (1967)
- Ceļa zīmes (1968)
- Stari stikla (1969)
- Uzbērums (1970)
- Klavs – The Son of Martins (1970)
- Peterss (1972)
- Ceplis (1972)
- Checkmate to the Queen of Diamonds (1973)
- Oļegs un Aina (1973)
- Dunduriņš (1974)
- In the Claws of the Black Crab (1975)
- Lake Sonata (1976)
- Nakts bez putniem (1979)
- Unfinished Supper (1979)
- Cīrulīši (1980)
- Long Road in the Dunes (1981)
- Salavecīša personiskā dzīve (1982)
- A Short Instruction in Love Affairs (1982)
- Fronte tēva pagalmā (1984)
- Double Trap (1986)
- Dubultnieks (1986)
- On, ona i deti (1986)
- The Zitar Family (1989)
- Maija and Paija (1990)
- The Chronicles of Melanie (2016)
- Bille (2018)
