= Jānis Judiņš =

Latvian military personnel

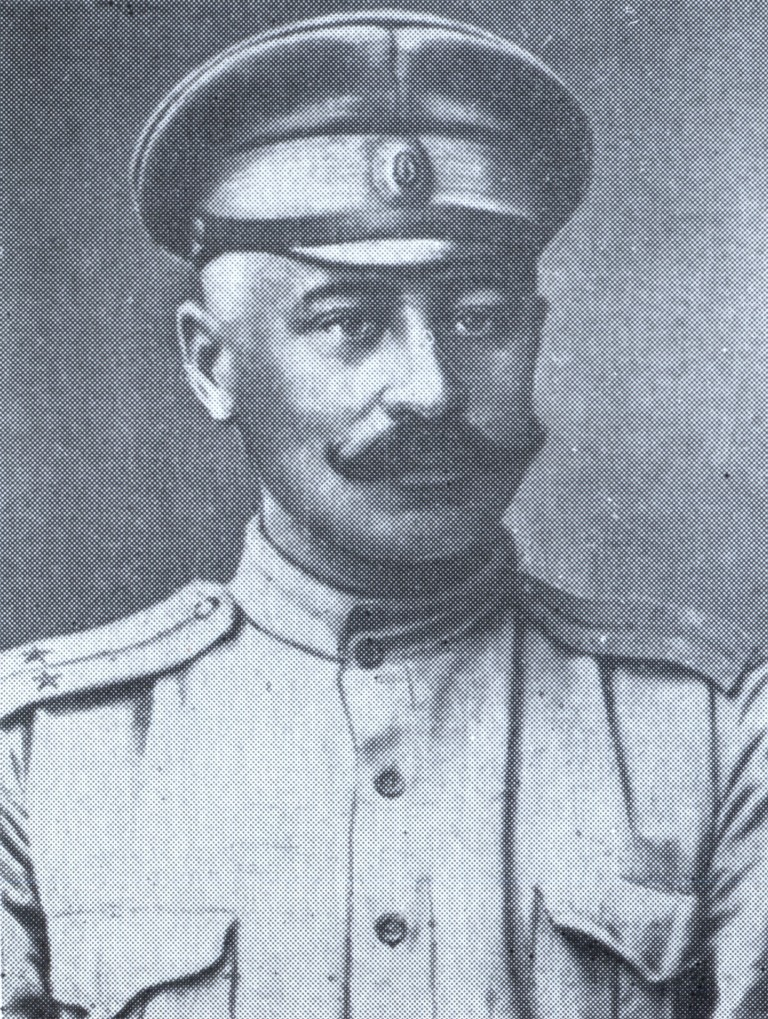
Jānis Judiņš

Jānis Judiņš (Latvian: Jānis Judiņš; Russian: Ю́дин Я́н Андре́евич, trans. Yan Yudin, also known in Russian as Я́нис Ю́диньш, trans. Yanis Yudinsh; January 17, 1884, in Liezēre parish – August 12, 1918) was a Red Latvian Rifleman commander, a Red Army hero of the Russian Civil War.

He was born on January 17, 1884, in Liezēre Parish in Latvia (now part of the Madona Municipality) to a landless family. He graduated from the Valka teaching seminary, became a teacher and made connections with the Social Democratic Party, then participating in the 1905 Russian Revolution. At the outbreak of World War I in 1914, he was drafted into the army of the Russian Empire where he originally served in a Rifle Regiment of the Royal Serbian Army. He was awarded the Cross of St. George for his heroic displays in battle, and trained at Vilnius Military School, which he graduated from in 1916 and became a Second Lieutenant soon after.

He joined the Russian Communists (Bolsheviks) Party in 1917 and continued to support them in the Russian Civil War. In April 1918, he was appointed commander of the 3rd Brigade of the Latvian Riflemen Soviet Division. In June, his Brigade took part in the destruction of the SR (Socialist Revolutionary Party) riot in Moscow, as well as repressing the Yaroslavl Uprising and fighting in the battle for Kazan.

Together with the 3rd Regiment, he was transferred to the Czechoslovak Front and appointed Commander of Soviet troops on the left bank of the Volga. In August 1918, Czech Legion and KomUch People's Army pressed the Red Army from Kazan. On 8 August 1918, Judeņš with his staff arrived at the Krasnaya Gorka railway station, a suburb of Kazan. On 12 August 1918, he was killed in action near the station by shell detonation.

On 14 August 1918, the Soviet of the People's Commissars under Vladimir Lenin decreed to rename Krasnaya Gorka to Yudino (today part of Kazan), after Jānis Judiņš. It was the first inhabited locality, renamed by Soviet power after the Civil War Red hero. He is buried in the village of Sviyazhsk, now part of the Zelenodolsky District in Tatarstan.
