= The Favorite (1976 film) =

- Written by: Alexey Nagorny; Heliy Ryabov
- Directed by: Vasile Brescanu
- Starring: Arnis Līcītis; Ints Burans; Ion Ungureanu
- Music by: Yakov Vaysburd
- Country of origin: Soviet Union
- Original language: Russian

Production
- Producers: I. Politov; A. Unchikova
- Cinematography: Leonid Proskurov
- Editor: Nikolai Chaika
- Running time: 132 minutes
- Production company: Moldova-Film

Original release
- Release: 1976

The Favorite (Russian: Фаворит, romanized: Favorit) is a two-part film based on the 1962 detective novel of British writer Dick Francis, Dead Cert. For the first time the Soviet Central Television was demonstrated on 13 and 14 September 1977.

== Plot ==
After the death of Bill Davidson at the races, his friend the jockey Alan York (Arnis Licitis) learns that this was not an accident. Attempts to establish a murder client lead him to the disclosure of a whole criminal group, headed by a person close to him.

He gradually penetrates deep into intrigue, connected not only with the jumps on which Bill died, but also with a local gang of taxi drivers. Not only love and the desire for the hostess of the new racehorse, Kate, which Alan must ride, but also the debt to Bill's wife, forces him to ask the same questions over and over again.

== Cast ==
- Arnis Līcītis as Alan York
- Ints Burans as Colonel William Davidson
- Ion Ungureanu as Inspector Lodge
- Romualdas Ramanauskas as Dan Hillman
- Mara Zwaigzne as Cat
- Gediminas Karka as Uncle George Edgar Penn
- Elza Radziņa as Auntie Debb Penn
- Jonas Vaitecaitis as Sandy Mason
- Vadim Vilsky as Tomkins
- Afanasi Trishkin as bandit

== Soundtrack ==
The film actively uses the music of John Lennon from the album Imagine.
