= Eleja manor house =

Manor house in Latvia

Coordinates: 56.4236°N 23.7008°E

Eleja manor house (German: Herrenhaus Elley) is the name of the ruins of a destroyed manor house, manor complex buildings and the surrounding English landscape garden. It is located in Eleja, in the Eleja Parish of Jelgava Municipality in the Semigallia region of Latvia.

During its 19th-century heyday the manor house was part of a property that included a well-kept park, 19 buildings (a brewery, stables, a wind mill, brick and lime kilns), ponds and 1500 hectares of farmland and forests.

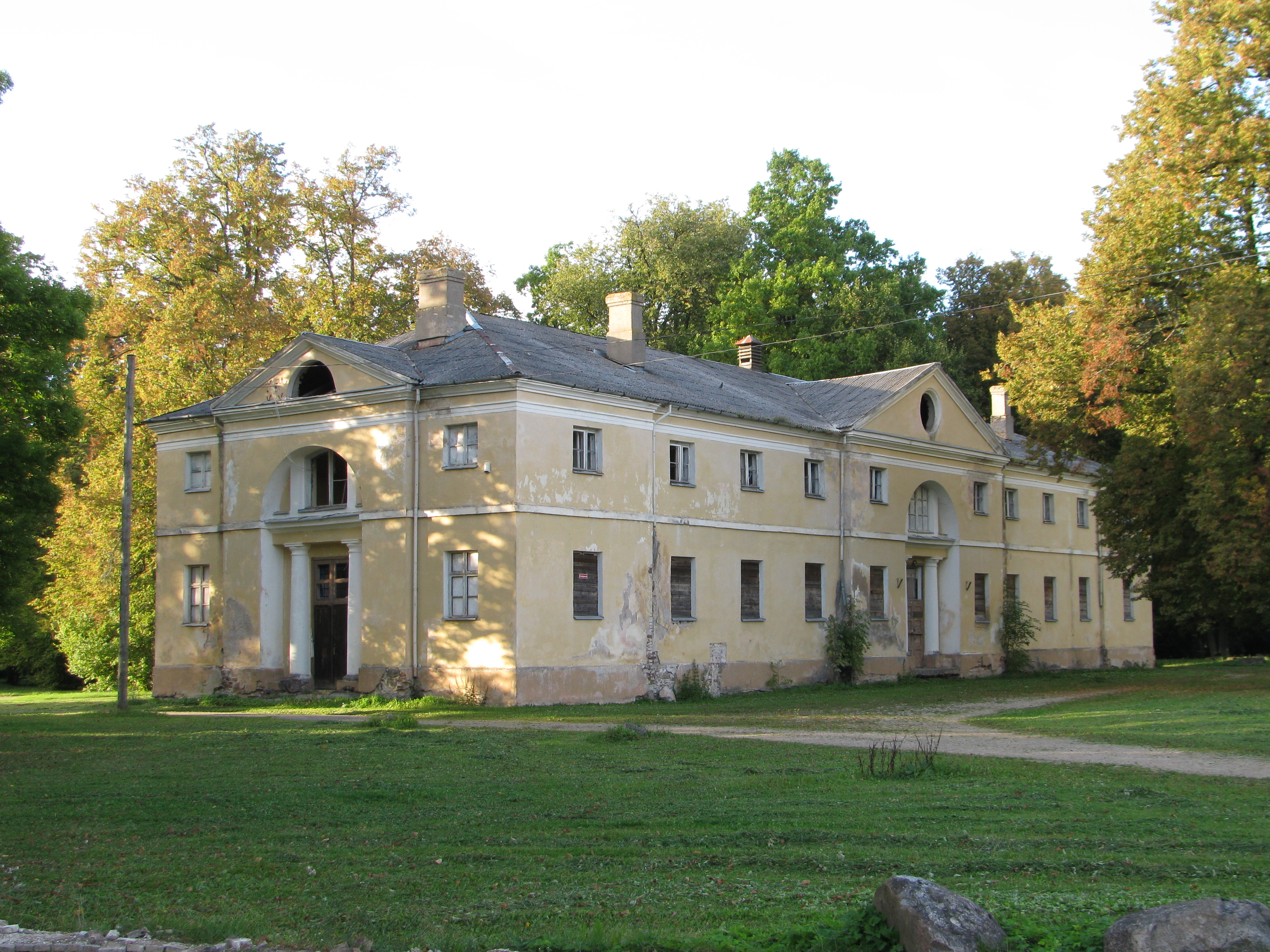
Former barn and theatre building

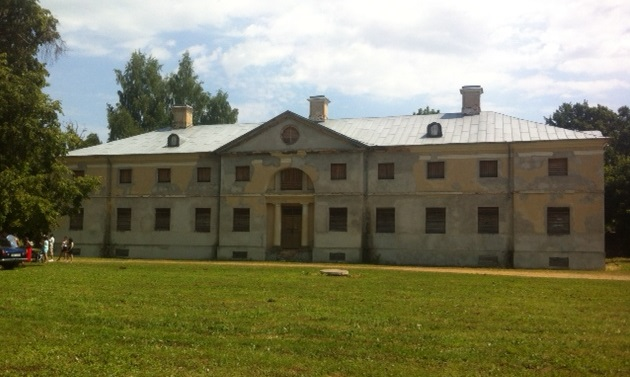
Former majordomo's house, 2015

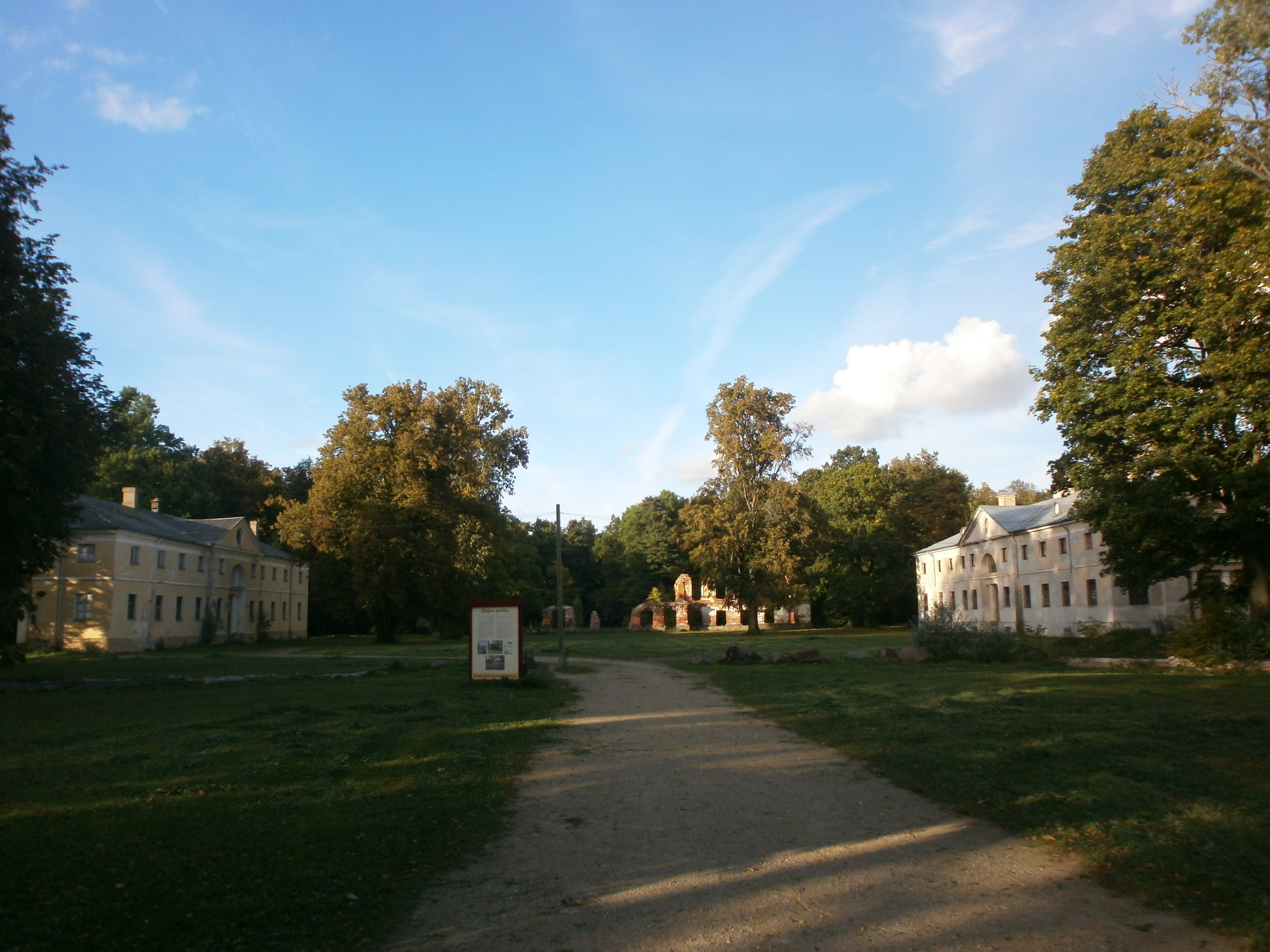
Manor house complex

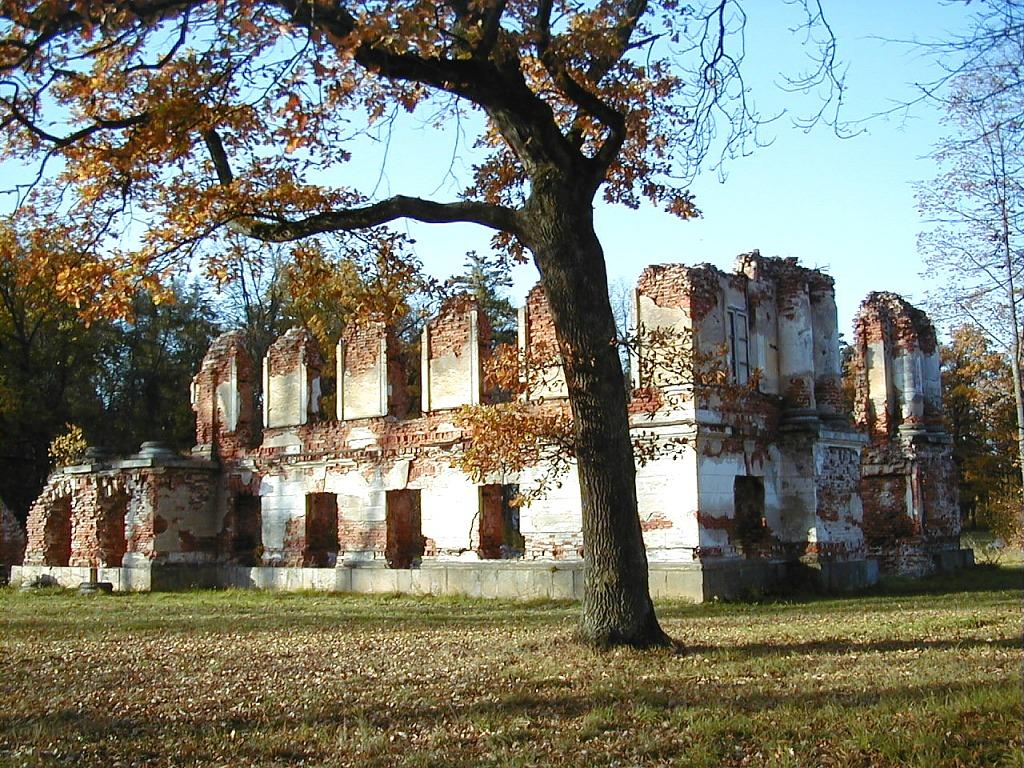
Manor house ruins

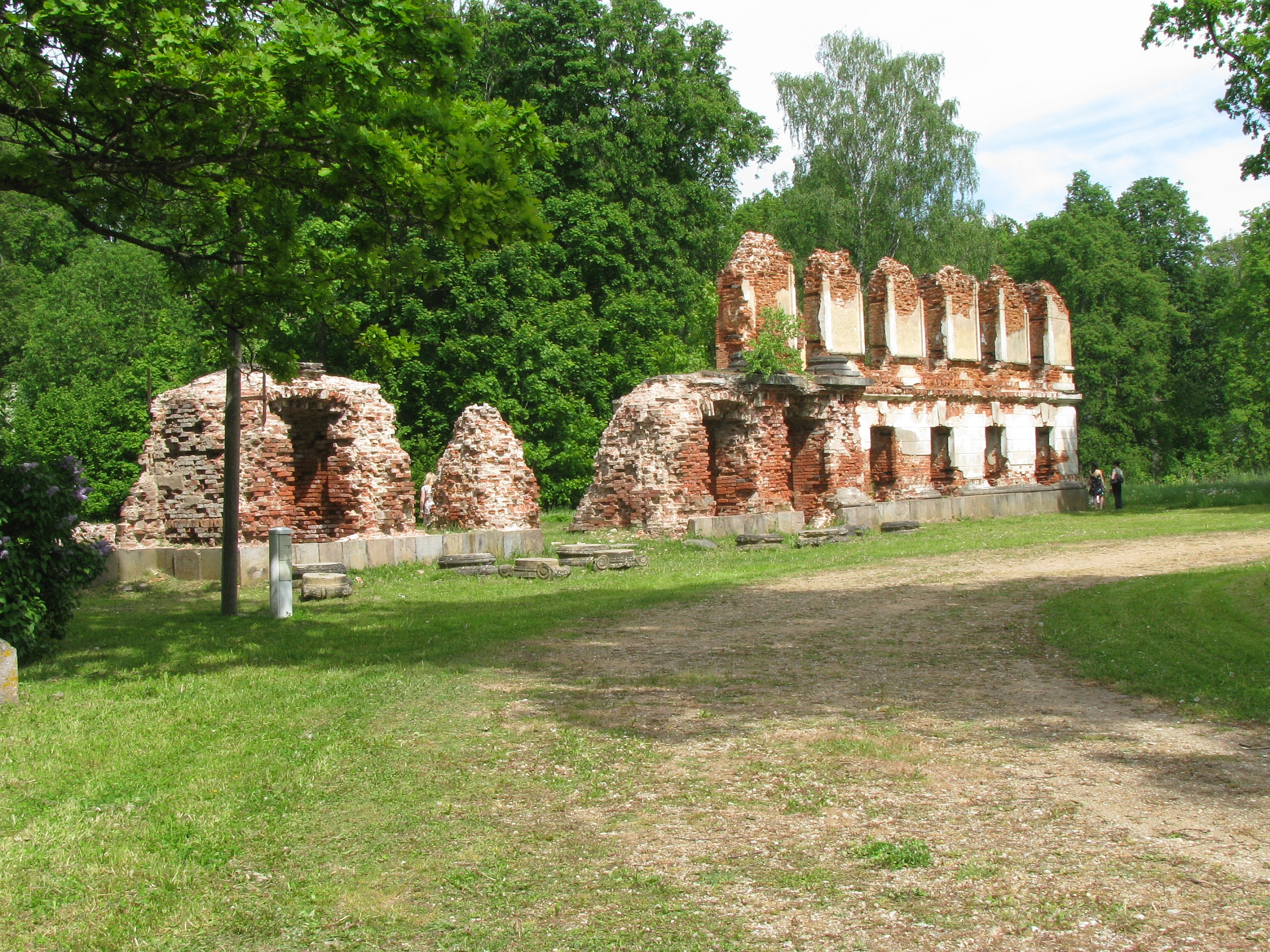
Manor house ruins

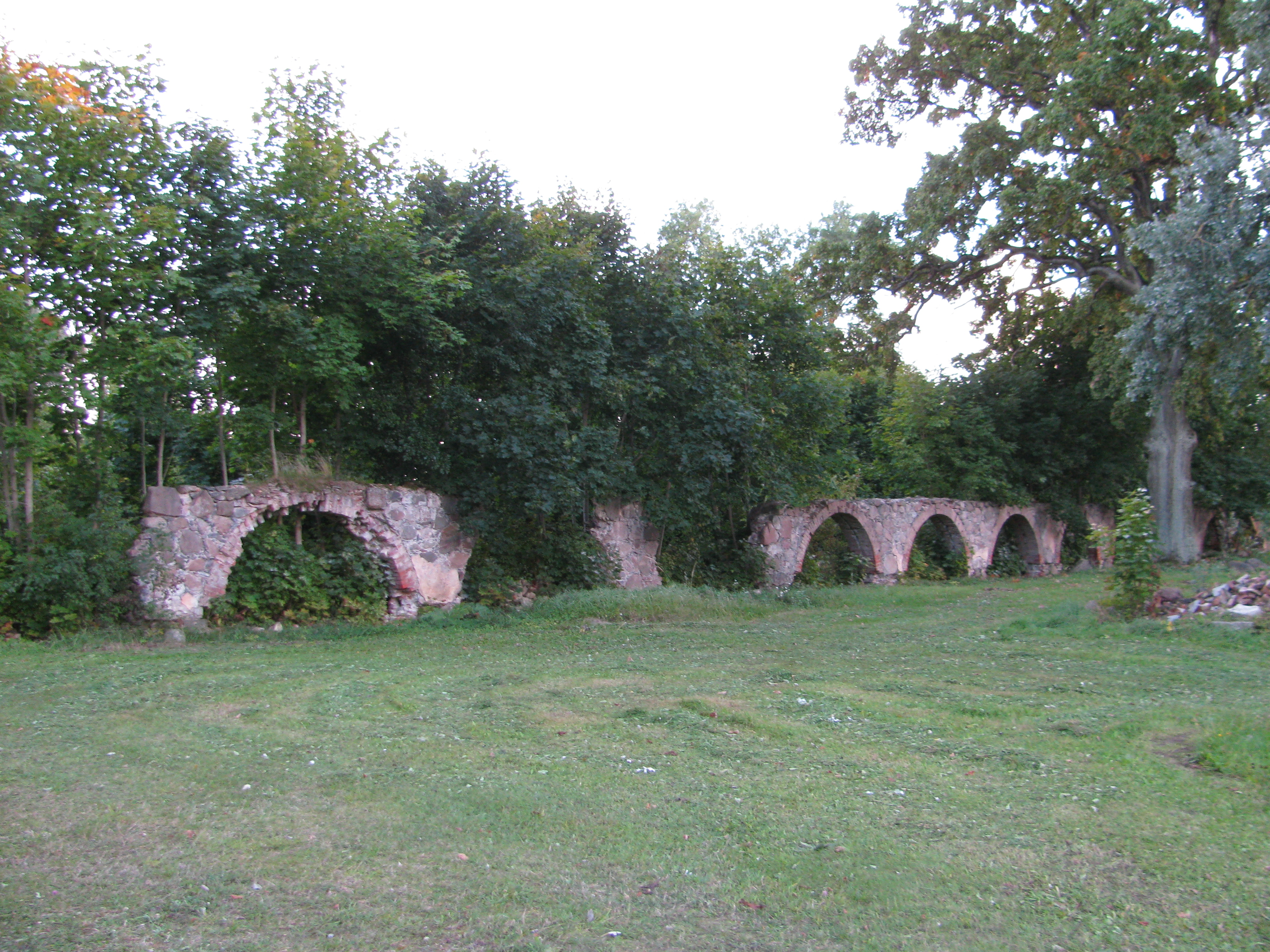
Arched stone fence

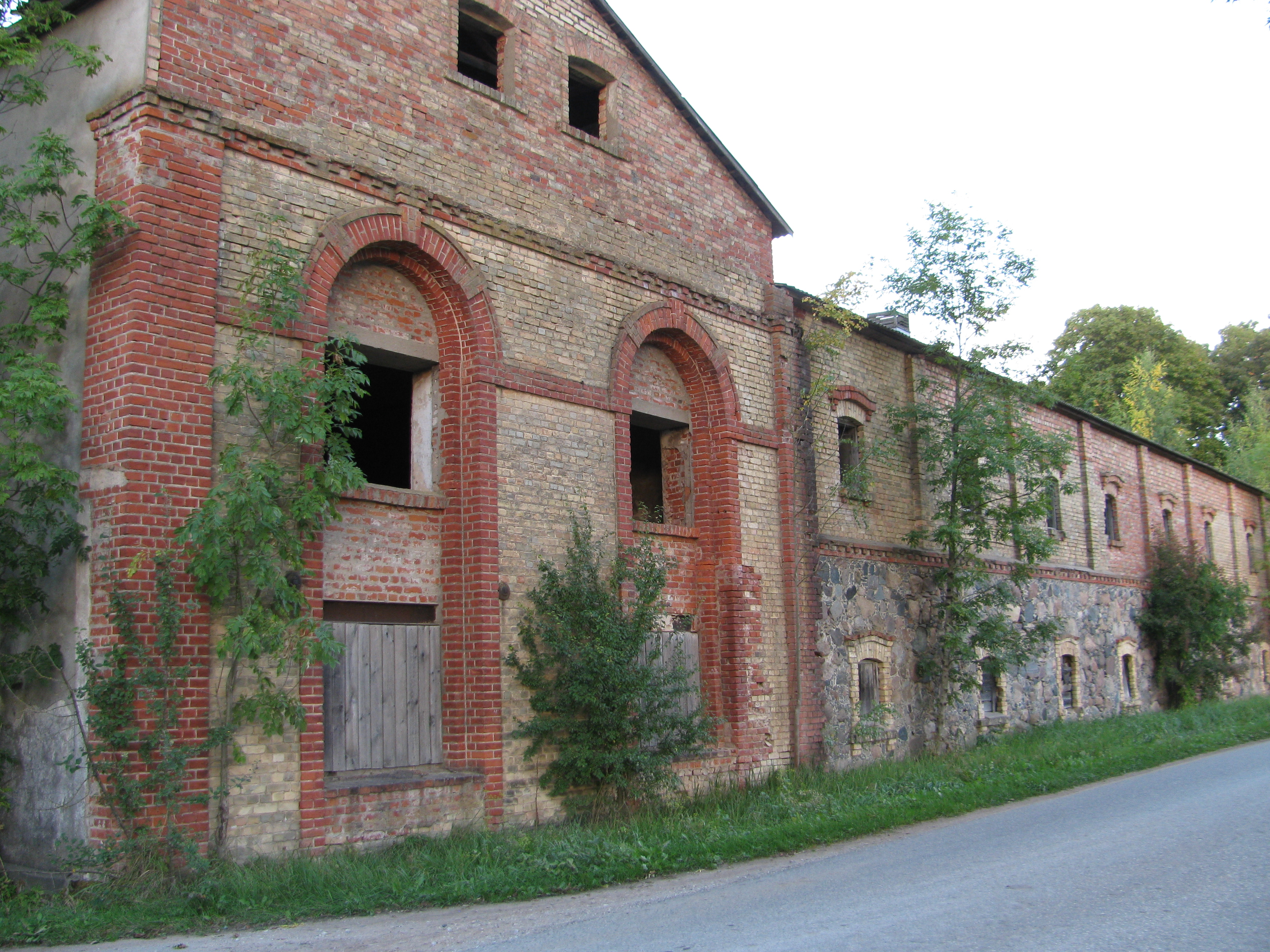
Brewery building

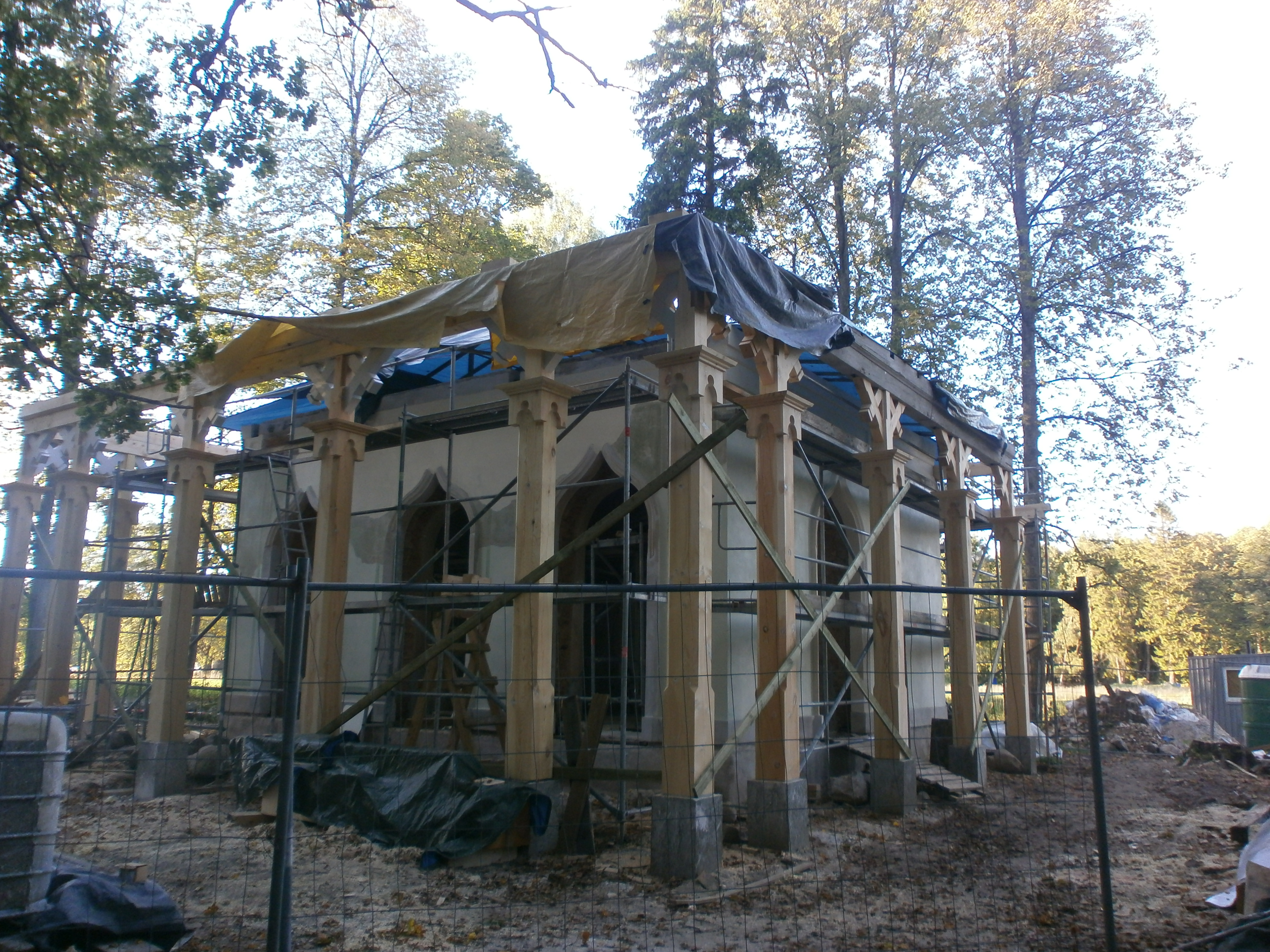
Tea house restoration, 2015

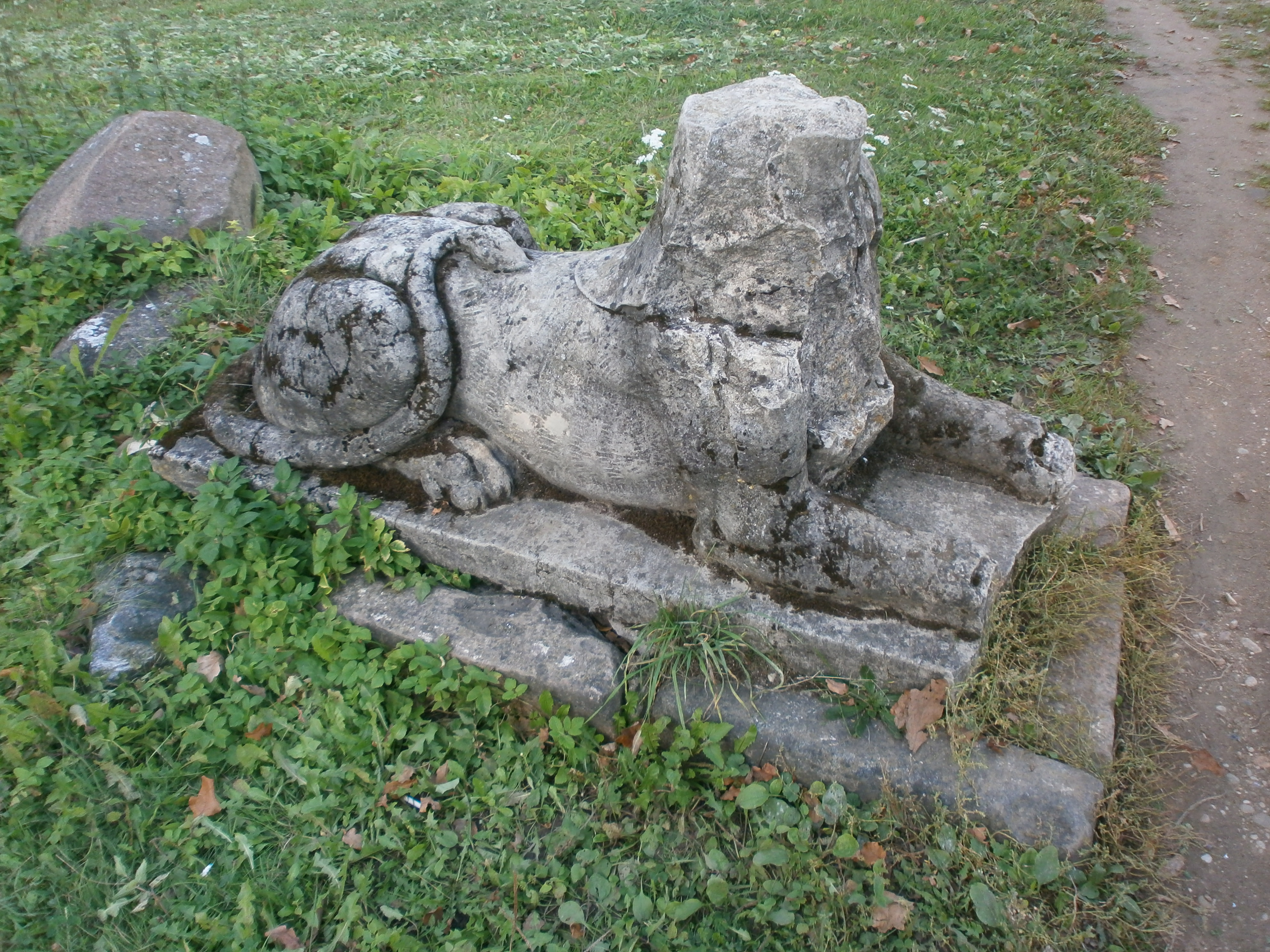
Sphinx

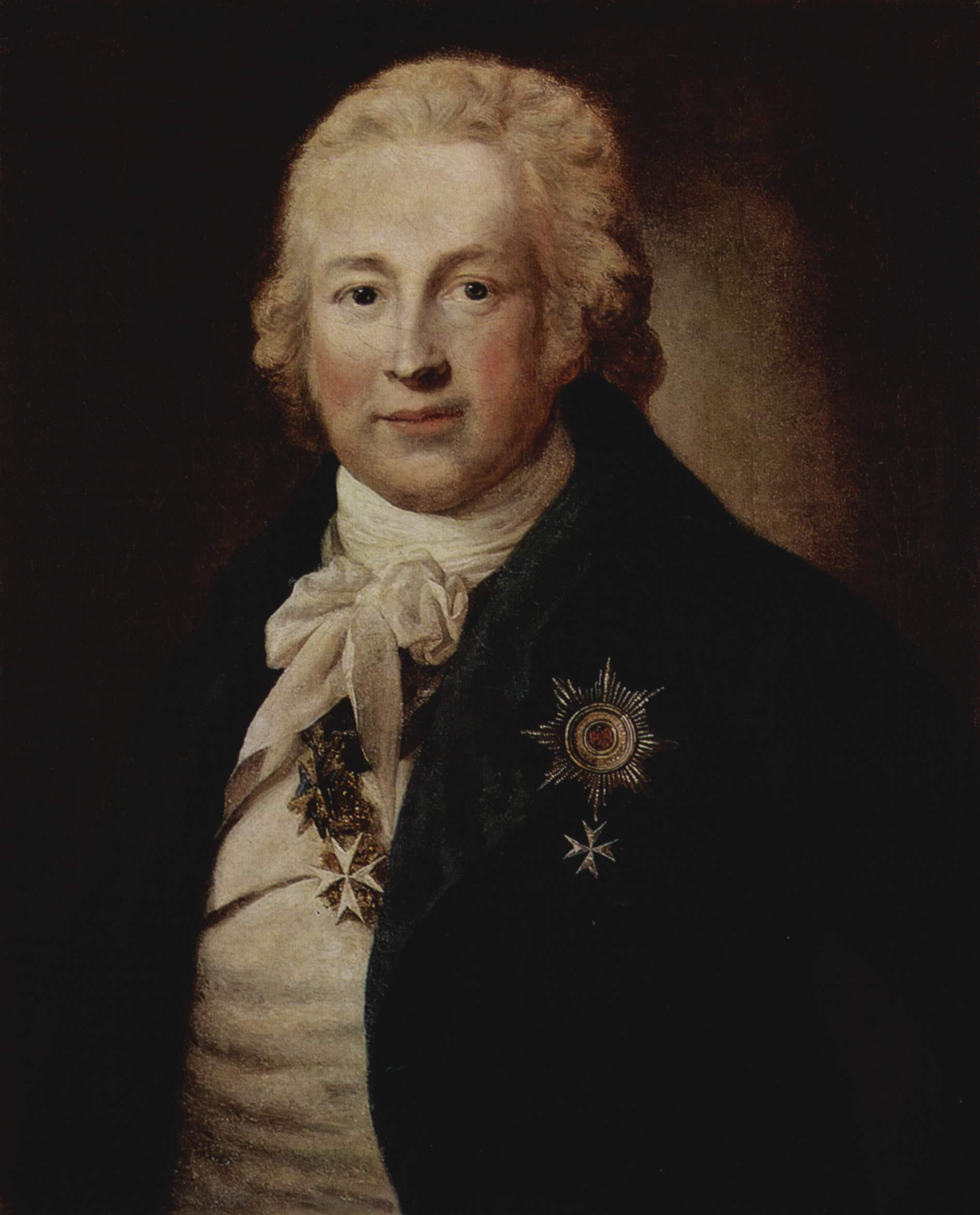
Christoph Johann Friedrich von Medem

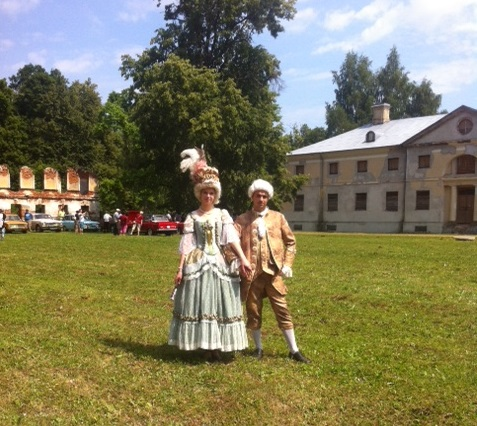
Performers in historic costumes, 2015

== History ==
From 1583 Eleja lands belonged to Georg von Tiesenhausen from the noble Tiesenhausen family. A wooden manor house was built by the Eleja river. After the death of Johann Friedrich von Tiesenhausen in 1716, the manor was inherited by his sister Amalie von Behr. After the death of Johann Ulrich von Behr (1716-1753), the manor was purchased in 1753 by the Count Johann Friedrich von Medem who paid 135 000 florins for it. There he built a new Rococo style manor house. His daughter's Dorothea von Medem's marriage to the Duke of Courland Peter von Biron in 1779 further elevated von Medems’ standing among the local nobles.

After the death of Johann in 1785, Eleja was inherited by his youngest son Christoph Johann von Medem. After many years of service in Kingdom of Prussia and Russian Empire, his attention returned to Eleja. In 1799 he married Maria Louise Elisabeth, daughter of Peter von der Pahlen, a favorite of emperor Paul I of Russia.

After incorporation of Courland into the Russian empire, von Medems retained their properties and from 1806 until 1810 Christoph Johann von Medem built the Eleja manor house. The building was designed by the famous architect Giacomo Quarenghi and after some design changes built by Johann Georg Adam Berlitz in a neoclassical style. Eleja manor style was influential in building Mežotne Palace and Kazdanga palace, both of which survive to our days.

After the death of Johann von Medem, Eleja was inherited by his oldest son Paul. After his death in 1854, Eleja was inherited by his brother Peter and in 1877 by his son Johann, who died in 1883 without leaving children. Eleja was inherited by Paul, who was the son of Christoph Johann von Medem's fourth son Theodore. Paul earned good money by raising horses and opening a brewery, which made him a profit of 100 000 rubles per year.

The manor house and most of the surrounding buildings were burned down by the retreating Russian army in July 1915. Von Medems spent some summers in the guest wing that was the least damaged. Paul von Medem left Latvia forever in 1918 and in 1939 died in Germany.

During the 1920 Latvia agrarian reform the 1586 ha of manor's land was divided among 150 farmers, and the main manor house buildings given to Eleja municipality. Medems were left with 50 ha of land and a servant's house, which they soon sold. Some of the remaining buildings were used as a school and theatre.

During the late 1920s there were some ideas about restoring the manor house, but the project was financially unfeasible. In 1926 Eleja municipality had plans to restore the manor house, but soon changed its mind and in 1927 started to demolish it. To prevent this, on July 28, 1927 Eleja manor house was included in the list of state protected monuments. Due to the onset of the Great Depression neither municipality nor the state had money for renovations and on August 16, 1933 state allowed municipality to proceed with the demolition, however, not much was done besides reducing the brewery building from 5 floors to two and using the bricks for a new community center building. In 1954 Eleja manor house once again was included in the list of State protected monuments, but nothing was done to protect or conserve the ruins and they continued to crumble.

Today only a few of the old buildings remain standing. EU funded efforts to renovate the tea house and the arched stone fence were started in 2015. In early 2016 this restoration was finished.
