= Lev Borisov =

Russian actor (1933–2011)

- Born: Lev Ivanovich Borisov; 8 December 1933; Plyos, Ivanovo Industrial Oblast, Russian SFSR, Soviet Union
- Died: 15 November 2011 (aged 77); Moscow, Russia
- Resting place: Troyekurovskoye Cemetery, Moscow
- Occupation: actor
- Years active: 1954-2011
- Spouse: The daughter of Tatiana's daughter Nadezhda

Lev Ivanovich Borisov (Russian: Лев Иванович Борисов; 8 December 1933, Plyos – 15 November 2011, Moscow) was a Russian actor. Brother of Oleg Borisov. He was a People's Artist of Russia.

Lev Borisov was buried at the Troyekurovskoye Cemetery.

== Selected filmography ==
- 1954 — Certificate of Maturity
- 1954 — Problem Child
- 1956 — Different Fates
- 1957 — The Height
- 1959 — Ballad of a Soldier
- 1959 — Destiny of a Man
- 1976 — Twelve Chairs
- 1978 — Again Aniskin
- 1980 — The White Raven
- 1983 — The Demidovs
- 1983 — The Мistress of the Оrphanage
- 1987 — Visit to Minotaur
- 1988 — Whose Are You, Old People?
- 1989 — Entrance to the Labyrinth
- 1989 — Vagrant Bus
- 1989 — Abduction of the Wizard
- 1990 — Cloud-Paradise
- 1995 — Shirli-Myrli
- 1996 — Barkhanov and his Вodyguard
- 1996 — Life Line
- 1997 — Snake Spring
- 2000/2003 — Bandit Petersburg
- 2004 — Pa
- 2004 — The Penal Battalion
- 2007 — A Second Before...
- 2008 — Batyushka
- 2012 — The Dragon Syndrome
