= Long Road in the Dunes =

1980 film by Aloizs Brenčs

- Written by: Dmitry Vasiliu; Oleg Rudnev
- Directed by: Aloizs Brenčs
- Starring: Lilita Ozoliņa; Juozas Kiselius; Romualdas Ramanauskas
- Music by: Raimonds Pauls
- Country of origin: Soviet Union
- Original languages: Latvian; Russian

Production
- Producer: Lilita Liepiņa
- Cinematography: Jānis Mūrnieks
- Editor: Tamāra Musņitska
- Running time: 439 minutes
- Production company: Riga Film Studio

Original release
- Release: 2 June – 4 June 1980

Long Road in the Dunes (Latvian: Ilgais ceļš kāpās, Russian: Долгая дорога в дюнах, romanized: Dolgaya doroga v dyunakh) is a 1981 Soviet Latvian seven-part TV melodrama, directed by Aloizs Brenčs. The original series was shot in Latvian by the Riga Film Studio, and an additional version was released with Russian voiceovers.

== Plot ==
The series depicts Latvia from 1939 through the 1970s, focusing on the enduring love story between Artur, a fisherman’s son, and the beautiful Marta. Their romance faces numerous hardships and misunderstandings amid the turbulence of war and post-war years. Artur returns to his village for his father’s funeral, takes up fishing, and rekindles a romance with Marta. Their relationship becomes strained due to a misunderstanding involving a wealthy factory owner’s son, Richard, leading Artur to mistakenly believe Marta is unfaithful. This rift paves the way for Marta’s arranged marriage to Richard, despite her carrying Artur’s child. The couple moves to Germany but is unable to return to Latvia due to political upheavals, with Marta giving birth to her son, Edgar, who Richard raises as his own.

As the war progresses, Artur becomes a partisan fighter and faces numerous challenges, including a severe injury. Marta, now back in Latvia, helps shelter a Soviet spy, further complicating her life under German occupation. Eventually, she is exiled to Siberia with her son Edgar due to her father’s past, struggling to survive until Artur, thought dead, intervenes on her behalf. Although years pass, fate brings them together once more, as Marta finally returns to her homeland with her son, where she and Artur are reunited, symbolizing the resilience of love amidst the trials of life.

== Cast ==
- Lilita Ozoliņa as Marta Ozola (Russian voiceover by Valentina Talyzina)
- Juozas Kiselius as Artūrs Banga (Latvian voiceover by Rolands Zagorskis, Russian voiceover by Aleksei Pankin)
- Romualdas Ramanauskas as Rihards Lozbergs (Latvian voiceover by Ģirts Jakovļevs, Russian voiceover by Valery Ryzhakov)
- Eduards Pāvuls as Jēkabs Ozols, Marta's father (Russian voiceover by Vladimir Safronov)
- Ārijs Geikins as Innkeeper Āboltiņš
- Aare Laanemets as Laimonis Kalniņš
- Dzidra Ritenberga as Erna
- Harijs Liepiņš as Lawyer Osvalds Kreizis
- Evgeny Zharikov as Otto Grīnbergs / Alexander Efimov
- Merle Talvik as Ilga
- Ivan Ryzhov as Mityay Akimych
- Lyubov Sokolova as Anisya, Mityay's wife (Latvian voiceover by Velta Krūze)
- Pauls Butkēvičs as Heinrihs Strautnieks (Russian voiceover by Boris Bystrov)
- Velta Līne as Maiga
- Arnis Līcītis as Dr. Lorans (uncredited)

== Filming ==
- Initially, the role of Marta was to be given to actress Vija Artmane.
- Episodes 6 and 7 were filmed in the village of Yalguba, Karelian ASSR as a substitute for the deportee village in Siberia.
