= Velta Līne =

Latvian actress (1923–2012)

- Born: August 28, 1923; Riga, Latvia
- Died: December 31, 2012 (aged 89); Riga
- Occupation: Actress
- Spouse: Gunārs Cilinskis (1957–1992)
- Children: Aigars
- Parent(s): Mārtiņš and Anna

Velta Līne (28 August 1923 – 31 December 2012) was a Soviet and Latvian actress, who worked in the Latvian National Theatre since 1945.

She was married to actor and film director Gunārs Cilinskis in 1957 until his death in 1992. They had a son named Aigars, who was born 24 May 1958.

Līne died on 31 December 2012 at the age of 89, due to illness.

== Filmography ==
Year	Title	Role
1947	Victorious Return	Biruta Aže
1956	A Lesson in History	Ilsa Lange
1963	Introduction to Life	Latvian evacuee
1973	Oļegs un Aina	Oļeg's mother
1974	Agony	Alexandra Feodorovna
1981	Long Road in the Dunes	Maiga

== Awards ==
- Stalin Prize (1948) – For the role of Kaiva Arvīda in "Māls un porcelāns"
- Order of the Badge of Honour (1956)
- People's Artist of the Latvian SSR (1964)
- People's Artist of the USSR (1973)
- Order of the Red Banner of Labour (1983)
- Order of the Three Stars (2008)
