= Jānis Polis =

Latvian pharmacologist

- Born: 25 June 1938; Eleja parish, Latvia
- Died: 12 April 2011 (aged 72); Riga, Latvia
- Education: Riga Polytechnical Institute
- Known for: Development of one of the first methods of synthesis of rimantadine
- Scientific career
- Fields: Chemistry
- Workplaces: Latvian Institute of Organic Synthesis

Jānis Polis (25 June 1938 – 12 April 2011) was a Soviet and Latvian pharmacologist and the developer of one of the first methods of synthesis of rimantadine, which was discovered in 1963 by William W. Prichard of Du Pont & Co. He was born in Eleja parish, Latvia. On 6 February 2009, Polis was awarded the WIPO Award for Outstanding Inventors. Polis died in Riga, Latvia on 12 April 2011 at the age of 72.
