= Cynics (film) =

- Russian: Циники
- Directed by: Dmitry Meskhiev
- Written by: Anatoli Marienhof; Dmitry Meskhiev
- Starring: Sergey Batalov; Yury Belyayev; Ingeborga Dapkunaite; Andrey Ilyin; Viktor Pavlov
- Cinematography: Yuriy Shaygardanov
- Music by: Vadim Golutvin
- Release date: 1991
- Country: Soviet Union
- Language: Russian

Cynics (Russian: Циники) is a 1991 Soviet drama film directed by Dmitry Meskhiev. The film takes place in 1918 in Petrograd. The film tells about the young historian Vladimir, who meets with Olga, who hates the revolution as much as she loves her.

== Plot ==
In revolutionary Petrograd, history teacher Vladimir meets Olga, the daughter of a wealthy citizen who has emigrated abroad. Olga approaches the turmoil around her with cynical humor, and eventually, she and Vladimir marry. Soon, Olga encounters Vladimir’s brother Sergei, a Bolshevik commander, and they begin an affair. Shaken by this betrayal, Vladimir retaliates by forming a relationship with the housemaid, Marfusha, an affair that amuses rather than disturbs Olga. Sergei later commands at the front, where he orders the execution of Olga’s brother Goga, a White Army soldier. Olga reacts to this tragic news with uncontrollable laughter that lasts for days, only losing interest in Sergei when he returns to Petrograd disabled.

Later, Olga meets NEP businessman Ilya Dokuchaev and, in her husband's presence, agrees to sleep with him. She donates the $15,000 she receives from Dokuchaev to famine relief and begins seeing him regularly, drawing Vladimir into a strange love triangle as a companion and dependent. For amusement, she introduces Dokuchaev to Vladimir and Sergei, candidly discussing her life and Dokuchaev’s fortune with them all. However, Dokuchaev is soon arrested by the Cheka. In a final twist, Olga calls Vladimir during one of his lectures to tell him she plans to shoot herself in five minutes. He rushes home to find her calmly lying in bed, but she shows him a bloody rag, revealing she is now paralyzed from the waist down. Surprisingly, Vladimir accepts the situation serenely, even telling a stranger afterward that he feels happy.

== Cast ==
- Sergey Batalov
- Yury Belyayev
- Ingeborga Dapkunaite
- Andrey Ilyin
- Viktor Pavlov
- Irina Rozanova
- Aleksandr Shekhtel
- Yekaterina Vasilyeva
