= Victorious Return =

- Latvian: Mājup ar uzvaru Russian: Возвращение с победой
- Directed by: Aleksander Ivanov; Pāvels Armands
- Written by: Mikhail Bleiman; Konstantin Isaev; Vilis Lācis
- Starring: Artūrs Dimiters; Ludmila Špīlberga; Velta Līne; Leonīds Leimanis; Artūrs Filipsons
- Cinematography: Eduard Tisse
- Music by: Anatols Liepiņš
- Release date: 1947
- Country: Soviet Union
- Languages: Latvian; Russian

Victorious Return (Latvian: Mājup ar uzvaru, Russian: Возвращение с победой, romanized: Vozvrashchenye s pobedoy) is a 1947 Soviet Latvian film directed by Aleksander Ivanov and Pāvels Armands. The film was directed by the Riga Film Studio.

The television broadcast of the film on Latvian TV in 1954 was the full first television broadcast in Latvian history.

The film is based on the play Victory by Vilis Lācis.

== Plot ==
During World War II, Soviet Army lieutenant Augusts Grieze, while covering the retreat of his comrades, is captured by the enemy. The Germans, unable to extract any useful information from him, resort to discrediting him by broadcasting a fabricated message on the radio in which Grieze allegedly calls on his fellow Latvians to lay down their arms. However, during an aerial attack, Grieze manages to escape and joins the partisans, adopting a false identity. As the Soviets retake Riga, Grieze, now one of the most successful and fearless fighters, is determined to clear his name and find the true traitor, Paulis Nagla, who had infiltrated the ranks of the Red Army.

== Starring ==
- Artūrs Dimiters as Augusts Grieze
- Ludmila Špīlberga as Augusts's mother
- Velta Līne as Biruta Aže
- Leonīds Leimanis as Opmanis
- Artūrs Filipsons as Vershinin
- Visvaldis Silenieks as Draudiņš
- Pavel Volkov as Melnikov
- Edgars Zīle as Pauls Nagla
- Herberts Zommers as Obersturmbannfuhrer Budbergs (credited as Herbert Zommer)
- Jānis Osis as Headman (Municipal elder)
- Arnolds Milbrets as Pēteris
- Luijs Šmits as Teacher Vītols
- Hermanis Vazdiks as Ērmanis
