= Abduction of the Wizard =

- Directed by: Viktor Kobzev
- Written by: Kir Bulychev; Viktor Kobzev
- Starring: Yulia Aug; Romualdas Ramanauskas; Sergey Varchuk; Vladimir Gostyukhin
- Cinematography: Rudolf Mescheryagin
- Music by: Algirdas Paulavičius
- Production company: Sverdlovsk Film Studio
- Release date: 1989
- Running time: 100 minutes
- Country: Soviet Union
- Language: Russian

Abduction of the Wizard (Russian: Похищение чародея, romanized: Pokhischeniye charodeya) is a 1989 Soviet science fiction film directed by Viktor Kobzev and based on the novel of the same name by Kir Bulychev.

== Plot ==
The action takes place in Belarus in the 1980s.

The young graduate student Anna comes to her native village to her grandmother's house which she has not visited in 12 years. In the peaceful village she is preparing to write her thesis. Suddenly, two strangers appear in the house and claim that the landlady of this house rented it yesterday to them for two weeks. Events develop and it turns out that strangers got into the twentieth century from the future — the 28th century, with the help of a time machine. Historian Kin and physicist Jules are searching for unrecognized geniuses whose life ended before their time. Their goal is to send such geniuses to the future, without changing the course of history (that is, to evacuate them at the time they are supposed to die). Here they have an intermediate stop and they need to go further, in the 13th century, to find there a certain boyar Roman, who lived at that time in these parts, and take him with them to the future. From the chronicles it is known that he invented gunpowder and the printing press, and, apparently, died when the city was taken by the Crusaders. From their point of view, he is a genius, and according to his contemporaries he is a sorcerer. Involuntarily Anna becomes involved in an amazing and dangerous adventure.

Jules and Kin, with the help of special equipment, receive an image and sound from the past. They see that the town of Zamoshe, where boyar Roman lives, will soon be attacked by crusaders. After finding out the situation, Jules goes after the genius, but in the past he is discovered. The only one who can come to his rescue is Anna. She proposes to send herself to the past and using her similarity to princess Magdalena to help him escape from the prison. The true genius, as it turns out to be, is not Roman, but his ugly and at first inconspicuous assistant Akiplesha. He is saved immediately before the final destruction of the city. Anna is also safely transferred back in her time.

== Cast ==
- Yuliya Aug — Anna Mazurkiewicz / Princess Magdalena
- Romualdas Ramanauskas — Kin Vladimirovich, a historian from the future, he is also a "restorer Terenty Ivanovich Vasiliev"
- Sergey Varchuk — Jules Valent, junior researcher from the future
- Vladimir Gostyukhin — Akiplesha
- Victor Soloviev — boyar Roman
- Andrei Boltnev — Landmaster Friedrich von Kockenhausen
- Lev Borisov — grandfather Gennady
- Andrei Zhagars — Prince Vyacheslav, son of Polotsk prince Boris Romanovich
- Vitaly Chetkov — the boy Gluzd, monk
- Sulev Luik — Bishop Albert of Riga
- Lyudmila Xenofontova — aunt of Magdalena
- Valentin Golubenko — The Mages
- Nartai Begalin — Polovets
