= Yuri Shaygardanov =

Russian cinematographer (1954–2025)

- Юрий Шайгарданов
- Born: 29 July 1954; Bashkir ASSR, Russian SFSR, USSR
- Died: 20 September 2025 (aged 71)
- Education: Gerasimov Institute of Cinematography
- Occupation: Cinematographer
- Notable work: Vagrant Bus (1990); Cynics (1991); Women's Property (1999)

Yuri Akhtyamovich Shaigardanov (Russian: Юрий Ахтямович Шайгарданов; 29 July 1954 – 20 September 2025) was a Russian cinematographer.

== Life and career ==
Shaigardanov was born near Ufa on 29 July 1954. In 1971 he graduated from school No 14 in Saransk. He worked as an assistant cameraman and cameraman at the Mordovian Film Correspondent Station from the Kazan Newsreel Studio. He studied under Vadim Yusov at the VGIK Faculty of Cinematography.

In the late 1980s, he began working at Lenfilm. He worked on a number of feature films, including Vagrant Bus (1990), Cynics (1991) and Women's Property (1999).

In 1993, Shaigardanov was a founder of the Association of Russian Cinematographers.

In 2025, he was awarded the "White Square" prize of the Guild of Cinematographers of Russia - "For Contribution to the Art of Cinematography".

Shaygardanov died on 20 September 2025, at the age of 71.

== Filmography ==
Year	Film	Notes	Ref
1988	Heart of a Dog		
1988	Whose Are You, Old People?		
1990	Vagrant Bus		
1991	Cynics		
1998	Country of the Deaf		
1999	Women's Property		
2003	Magnetic Storms		
2006	Kiss of a Butterfly		
2011	Once Upon a Time There Lived a Simple Woman		
2019	A Frenchman		
