= The Invisible Man (1985 film) =

- Directed by: Aleksandr Zakharov
- Written by: Aleksandr Zakharov; Andrei Dmitriev
- Based on: The Invisible Man suggested by 1897 novel by H. G. Wells
- Starring: Andrey Kharitonov; Romualdas Ramanauskas; Leonid Kuravlyov
- Cinematography: Valery Shuvalov
- Edited by: Yelena Surazhskaya
- Music by: Eduard Artemyev
- Production company: Mosfilm
- Release date: 4 February 1985 (Soviet Union)
- Running time: 89 minutes
- Country: Soviet Union
- Language: Russian

The Invisible Man (Russian: Человек-невидимка, romanized: Chelovek-nevidimka) is a 1985 Soviet science fiction comedy-drama film directed by Aleksandr Zakharov based on the 1897 eponymous novel by H. G. Wells.

== Plot ==
Dr. Griffin, with no other motive than curiosity, undertakes research on the concept of invisibility. Having become invisible, he finds himself in an unfortunate combination of circumstances consisting of being suspected of murder and hunted down, forced to abandon the notebooks containing the notes of his experiences that would enable him to carry out the opposite process. His former classmate Dr. Kemp promises to find them, but in fact intends to use them himself in search of absolute power.

== Cast ==
- Andrey Kharitonov as Jonathan Griffin, The Invisible Man
- Romualdas Ramanauskas (voiced by Sergei Malishevsky) as Kemp
- Leonid Kuravlyov as Thomas Marvel
- Natalia Danilova as Jane Bet
- Oleg Golubitsky as Colonel Edai, Chief of Police
- Nina Agapova as Mrs. Hall
- Viktor Sergachyov as Mr. Hall
- Alexander Pyatkov as Bar owner
