= Gunārs Cilinskis =

Latvian actor and film director

- Born: 23 May 1931; Riga, Latvia
- Died: 25 July 1992 (aged 61); Riga district, Latvia
- Occupation: Actor

Gunārs Cilinskis (23 May 1931 – 25 July 1992) was a Latvian theater and film actor, film director and screenwriter. Cilinskis was born in Riga and died in Riga district. He was a People's Artist of the USSR (1979).

== Personal life ==
- Wife — Velta Line (1923–2012), actress, People's Artist of the Soviet Union (1973)
- Son — Aigars (1958–2007)
