= Eleja =

Village in Latvia

- Village
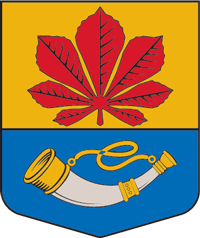
- Coat of arms

- Location within Latvia
- Coordinates: 56.4067°N 23.6875°E
- Country: Latvia
- Historical region: Zemgale
- Municipality: Jelgava
- Parish: Eleja

Population
  - Total: 800

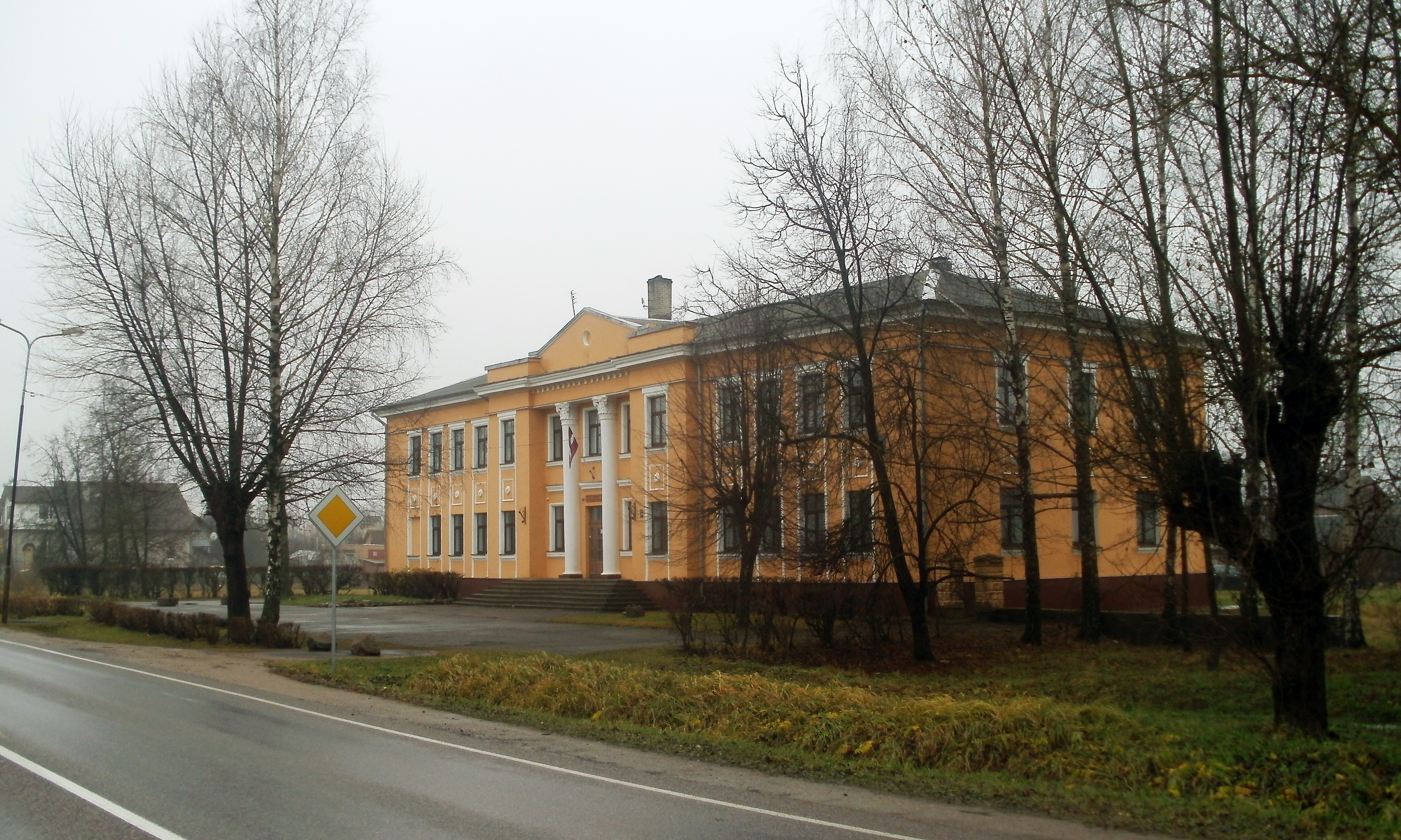
Eleja primary school

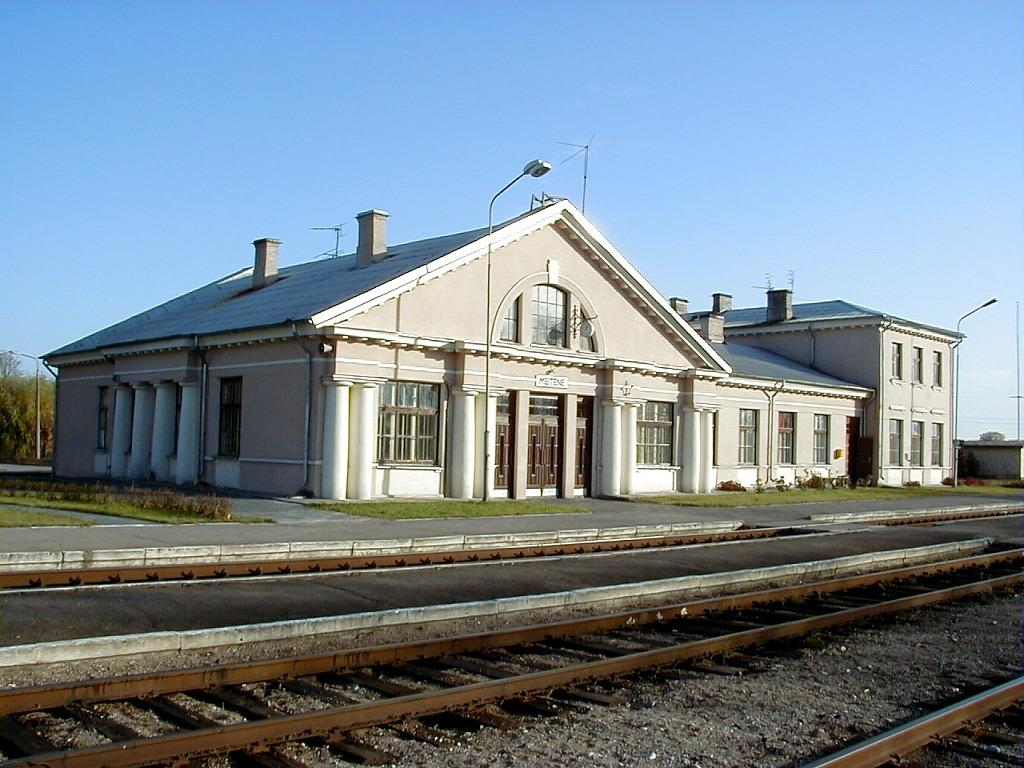
Meitene railroad station

Eleja is a village in the Eleja Parish of Jelgava Municipality in the Semigallia region of Latvia. Located 27 km south from Jelgava it spreads along the A8 highway crossroads with the regional P103 road.

Meitene railroad station, located in the village, is no longer used for passenger service. The actual village of Meitene is a couple of kilometers south, right on the Latvia-Lithuania border.

== History ==
During the 16th century the Eleja manor was established by the Eleja river. Owned first by Georg von Tiesenhausen from the Tyzenhaus family and later by Ulrich von Baehr (Bähr) in 1753 it was purchased by Count Johann Friedrich von Medem. Medem family owned it until the land reform of 1920.

Between the 1806 and 1810 a grand new Eleja manor house was built here, which was burned down by the retreating Russian army in July 1915 and further demolished during the 1920-30s. Some efforts at renovating the manor house building complex and the arched stone fence started in 2015.

During the German military occupation the Jelgava–Meitene Railway was built through here, with a narrow-gauge railroad connection between Meitene and Bauska built in 1916. During this time a new village named Vilkudārzs (Wolf's garden) started growing here. On 1932 the place was given the rights of village and on 1936 given its present name – Eleja.

From 1949 until 1956 it was the administrative center of the Eleja district. On February 21, 1950, it was named a worker's village; on 1961 elevated to the level of urban-type settlement, which it lost after 1990 territorial reform when Eleja and the surrounding Eleja country territory was united in a single parish. From 2009 included in the Jelgava municipality.

Despite all the territorial changes, Eleja still is the center of the local area where the local administration, high school, kindergarten, library and community center are located. Latraps, one of Latvia's largest farmers co-operatives, has a production site here.
