= Romualdas Ramanauskas =

Lithuanian film and theater actor (born 1950)

- Born: 4 February 1950 (age 76); Vilnius
- Occupation: Actor
- Years active: 1970–present
- Children: Rokas Ramanauskas

Romualdas Ramanauskas (born 4 February 1950, Vilnius) is a Lithuanian film and theater actor.

== Biography ==
In 1972 he graduated from the Lithuanian Conservatoire. He worked for 20 years as an actor at the Lithuanian National Drama Theatre. In 1992 he moved to the Youth Theatre of Lithuania, in 2001, returned to LNDT (up to 2003).

Since 1970, he appeared in films, playing mostly roles of antagonists. His biggest role was of Richard Lozberg in the television series Long Road in the Dunes (1980–1981).

== Selected filmography ==
- 1970: The Damned Submission
- 1972: Herkus Mantas
- 1976: The Favorite
- 1981: Long Road in the Dunes
- 1982: Rich man, poor man
- 1983: Anxious Sunday
- 1984: European History
- 1984: The Invisible Man
- 1985: We charge
- 1985: Karmelyuk
- 1985: Option Zombie
- 1986: Astrologer
- 1987: The Invisible Man
- 1989: Abduction of the Wizard
- 1992: Doublet
- 1992: In the mist
- 1996: Judenkreis, or eternal wheel
- 2007: War and Peace
