= Merle Talvik =

Estonian actress

- Born: 6 June 1954 (age 71); Tallinn, then part of Estonian SSR, Soviet Union
- Occupation: Actress
- Years active: 1973–present
- Spouse: Margus Kappel (divorced)
- Children: 1

Merle Talvik (born 6 June 1954) is an Estonian stage, film and television actress whose career began in the mid-1970s.

== Early life and education ==
Merle Talvik was born in Tallinn to Herbert and Asta Talvik (née Tomson). She attended primary and secondary schools in Tallinn and in 1973, at age nineteen, began performing as part of an ensemble cast with the Viru Varietee; a variety show established at Tallinn's Viru Hotel. She then enrolled at the Tallinn State Conservatory (now, the Estonian Academy of Music and Theatre), graduating in 1978.

== Career ==
=== Stage ===
Following her graduation from the Tallinn State Conservatory, Talvik began a year-long engagement as a stage actress at the Vanemuine theatre in Tartu. Talvik then spent over twenty years with the Vanalinnastuudio in Tallinn, performing in over fifty stage roles.

=== Film ===
Talvik's first significant film role was as Tonya in the 1977 Russian language film The Sun, the Sun Again, directed by Svetlana Druzhinina for Mosfilm. The following year, she appeared in her first Estonian film, Reigi õpetaja, directed by Jüri Müür. In 1981, she had a starring role as Katrina Leet in the Arvo Kruusement-directed drama Karge meri, based on the 1938 novel of the same name by author August Gailit. In 1983, she appeared as Krista Tammet in a leading role in the Dmitri Svetozarov-directed Russian-language Lenfilm drama Speed.

Other film roles include Daisy in the 1985 Ago-Endrik Kerge-directed Tallinnfilm musical-drama Savoy Ball and smaller roles in the 1980 Kaljo Kiisk-directed drama Metskannikesed; the 1987 Lembit Ulfsak-directed comedy-drama Keskea rõõmud; the 1990 Kaljo Kiisk-directed drama Regina, based on the 1978 novel Valikuvõimalus by Aimée Beekman; and in the 2009 Hannu Salonen-directed crime-drama Vasha.

=== Television ===
In addition to stage and film roles, Talvik has frequently appeared on Estonian television. In 1981, she appeared as Ilga in the seven-part Aloizs Brenčs-directed Latvian language television melodrama miniseries Ilgais ceļš kāpās. In 1982, she had a starring role in the Leo Karpin-directed television comedy film Teisikud opposite singer Jaak Joala, which was subsequently released theatrically. From 1994 until 1996, she had a recurring role as Helgi in the popular, long-running Eesti Televisioon (ETV) drama Õnne 13. In 2002, she played the role of Valentina on the TV3 series Nurjatud tüdrukud. From 2012 until 2016, she played a recurring role as Tiiu Pärn on the TV3 comedy-crime series Kättemaksukontor. From 2013, she has played the role of Maria on the Kanal 2 comedy-drama series Naabriplika.

In 2024, she began appearing in the role of Helgi in the Ergo Kuld directed TV3 drama Valetamisklubi.

== Personal life ==
Merle Talvik has been married twice. Her second husband was musician Margus Kappel. The couple have a son, Karl Olaf, and later divorced.
