= Vagrant Bus =

- DVD cover
- Directed by: Iosif Kheifits
- Written by: Lyudmila Razumovskaya
- Starring: Lev Borisov; Mikhail Zhigalov; Afanasi Trishkin
- Cinematography: Yuri Shaygardanov
- Edited by: Raisa Izakson
- Music by: Yakov Vaysburd
- Production company: Lenfilm
- Release date: 1990
- Running time: 93 min
- Country: Soviet Union
- Language: Russian

Vagrant Bus (Russian: Бродячий автобус, romanized: Brodyachiy avtobus) is a 1990 Soviet drama film, filmed at the studio Lenfilm by the director Iosif Kheifits.

== Story ==
The film tells about the artists one theater. This is a wandering troupe, which travels to his old nearly broken bus from one settlement to another, to show the audience some of his performances. Each of the artists on his love of theater, but the film also raises the problem and the material plane, for example the problem of choosing between creativity and money.

== Cast ==
- Lev Borisov as Nicholay Tyulpanov
- Mikhail Zhigalov as Vasily
- Afanasi Trishkin as Ivan Ivanovich Daganovsky (voice Igor Dmitriev)
- Sergey Parshin as drunken farmer
- Liya Akhedzhakova as administrator Zina
- Elena Kozlitina as Olya, mother Kostik
- Oleg Vavilov as Sergey Pavlovich
- Irina Rakshina as property master Larochka
- Valentin Bukin as bus driver Maksimych
- Galina Saburova as Verevkina
- Galina Chiginskaya as Olga, wife of Nicholay
- Lyubov Malinovskaya as cook Valya
- Alexander Lykov as the viewer in the country club
- Konstantin Mirkin as Kostik
- Nadezhda Eryomina
- Pavel Pervushin
- Vladimir Gor'kov
- Viktor Kolpakov
- Nikolai Lebedev
- Lyubov Uchaeva

== Film crew ==
- Written by: Ludmila Razumovskaja libretto by Joseph Heifits
- Director: Joseph Kheifits
- Operator: Yuri Shaygardanov
- Artist: Vladimir Svetozarov
- Composer: Andrey Petrov
- Props and scenery: Evi Schneidman
- Sound: Igor Vigdorchik
