= Žanis =

- Gender: Male

Origin
- Region of origin: Latvia

Other names
- Related names: Jānis

Žanis is a Latvian masculine given name and may refer to:

- Žanis Ansons (1911–1968), Latvian member of Waffen-SS during World War II
- Žanis Bahs (1885–1941), Latvian military general
- Žanis Blumbergs (1889–1938), Latvian-Soviet military leader
- Žanis Butkus (1906–1999), Latvian Captain in the Waffen SS during World War II
- Žanis Lipke (1900–1987), Latvian rescuer of Jews in Riga during World War II
- Žanis Peiners (born 1990), Latvian basketball player
- Zanis Waldheims (1909–1993), Latvian geometric abstract painter
