= Vadim Grachyov =

Vadim Viktorovich Grachyov (Russian: Вадим Викторович Грачёв) (January 15, 1932–July 31, 1994) was a Soviet and Russian film and stage actor.
