= Jānis Beinarovičs =

Latvian wrestler (1907–1967)

- Born: June 5, 1907; Riga, Russian Empire
- Died: August 27, 1967 (aged 60); Montreal, Quebec, Canada
- Occupation: Cabinet Maker
- Known for: Held Latvian Master's title in Greco-Roman wrestling four times.

Jānis Beinarovičs (June 5, 1907 – August 27, 1967) was a Latvian athlete who won the Latvian Master's title in Greco-Roman wrestling four times between the years 1935 to 1938. He joined the Second Riga Athletic Club (2 R.A.K.) at the age of 17 and competed in the Bantam weight class. A cabinet maker by trade, Beinarovičs had to train in his spare time. He acquired a total of ten titles in Latvia's amateur championships during his career.

== Beginnings of clubs and competitions ==
Greco-Roman wrestling is a sport that became very popular in Latvia in the 1920s and 1930s. Amateur clubs were formed soon after the country was founded in 1918. Beinarovičs joined such a club, trained in the Bantam category, competed and then coached and mentored other wrestlers. Competitions took place in Latvia as well as other European jurisdictions. Many capitals of European countries hosted these team championships, such as Rome (1934), Copenhagen (1935), Paris (1937), Tallinn (1938), and Oslo (1939). These competitions were called the European Masters Greco-Roman Wrestling Championships. Beinarovičs qualified once for the team, that would contend in these European matches.

Besides, competitions with well-known wrestlers from Estonia, a Baltic neighbor, were organized on a yearly basis. Between 1925 and 1940 the two countries alternated the hosting of these matches fifteen times. Weight classes from Bantam to Heavyweight participated. In 1921 a provisional Latvian Olympic Committee was established, and three years later, 41 Latvian competitors took part for the first time at the 1924 Paris Summer Olympics. In 1936 Edvins Bietags won the first silver medal for Greco-Roman wrestling in the Light Heavyweight category at the Olympics.

== Early wins ==
Beinarovičs won the Latvian Masters Title for the first time in 1935, That qualified him to join the National Latvian Wrestling Team which represented Latvia in the European Competitions held in Copenhagen the same year. He competed against an Estonian, Evald Sikk, who won the match. (The following year, Sikk went on to compete in the 1936 Berlin Olympics, coming in sixth place.) In Latvia, Beinarovičs won the Latvian Masters title for a second time.

== Rise to prominence ==
By 1937, Beinarovičs was gaining a reputation for his sport, which was becoming increasingly popular. He joined the Army Sports Club (ASK) and qualified for the third time to contend in the upcoming matches against the Estonian team. His event took place on October 3 and was attended by 1,200 spectators in the Sports Hall in Riga. Beinarovičs beat his younger opponent, Maiste, and was praised for his final move, where he pinned Maiste's shoulder to the mat. Latvia won 4 - 3 over the Estonian team.

His fourth and final Masters Title win in Latvia allowed him to compete once again in the European Competitions in Tallinn, Estonia in 1938. His teammates in the various weight categories were Edvins Bietags, Alfrēds Kalniņš, Georgs Ozoliņš, Kārlis Jespars, E. Kalniņš, and Krišjānis Kundziņš, and the coach was Aleksandrs Lapčinskis. Beinarovičs, in Bantam weight, was defeated by the Czechoslovak wrestler, Nics.

== Continued involvement in the sport ==
After the loss in Estonia, Beinarovičs continued his involvement with the sport, but focused his efforts on coaching young, aspiring wrestlers. He was part of a team of professional trainers at the ASK, 116 Kr. Barona street, in Riga. He coached wrestlers and refereed competitions as late as 1944 before he was conscripted into the army to fight on the Russian front.

== Awards and recognition ==
In 1938, Beinarovičs and other ASK wrestlers were honored for their athletic achievements by the Heavy Athletics Sports Federation. Awards for personal contributions were also presented. He received one for his commitment to furthering the goals of the ASK. The following year, in November 1939, with World War II having already been declared, medals were given to Latvian athletes who had represented their country over the years in the heavy athletics categories of wrestling and weightlifting. This highest form of recognition was awarded at a final ball held in their honor at the Amateur Hall at 3 Amata Street in Riga. This meant to serve as a tribute to the devotion of Latvian athletes to their sport and their country over the 20 years of its existence as a sovereign nation. Latvia became independent 52 years later in 1991.
