= Jānis Reinis =

Latvian actor

- Born: Jānis Reinis; 13 December 1960; Obeliai, Lithuanian SSR (now Lithuania)
- Died: 26 August 2016 (aged 55); Ādaži Municipality, Latvia

Jānis Reinis (13 December 1960 – 26 August 2016) was a Latvian actor. In the theatre, he worked for several years in Latvian National Theatre and Dailes Theatre. He also took part in several films.

== Filmography ==
Year	Film	Role	Release date	Notes
1986	Troynoy pryzhok Pantery	Diversant Ivan/Gustav	1986	
1988	Viktorija	Vilnis	1998	
1991	The Time of the Land Surveyors		1991	
1996	De nieuwe moeder	Juris	3 October 1996	
2000	Dangerous Summer	Kārlis	2000	
2007	Defenders of Riga	Mārtiņš	11 November 2007	
2009	The Courageous Heart of Irena Sendler	SS officer	19 April 2009	
2012	Gulf Stream Under the Iceberg	Veterinarian		
