= Jānis Miglavs =

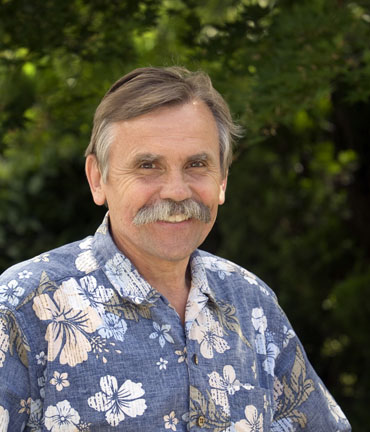
- Born: 1948 (age 77–78)
- Known for: Photography
- Website: www.jmiglavs.com

Jānis Miglavs is a Latvian-American photographer and writer most noted for his work with myths and archetypal dreams of the most remote African tribes and vineyards/wineries of the world, most recently those in China.

== Childhood and education ==
Born in 1948 in a displaced persons camp in Germany after his parents fled Latvia, Miglavs learned firsthand the importance of culture and the ripping pain of its loss. Eventually, his family immigrated to the United States, where he graduated with a bachelor's degree in Sociology from the University of California at Berkeley, then received a master's degree in Fine Arts from California State University at Sacramento.

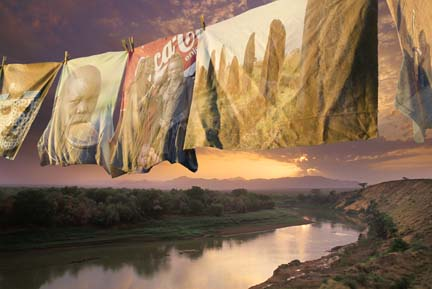
"One of my dreams while in Ethiopia working on the Africa's Undiscovered Myths Project."

== Inspiration and career ==
His first calling to adventure travel photography came in 1976, during a four-month trip through Japan, northern India, Nepal and Sikkim. In Nepal, Miglavs was one of the first to be allowed into the Muktinath / Mustang area on the border with Tibet. The warm-hearted people, the immense mountainous landscapes and the monks who taught him about Yoga and Tibetan Buddhism expanded his inner vision of the world.

Miglavs went on to photograph and write for publications, including National Geographic, Travel & Leisure, Sunset and National Wildlife, traveling through more than 30 countries over 25 years. His commercial clients include Hewlett Packard, Deloitte, 7-Eleven, Sheraton Hotels, Oregon Tourism, PGE and Nikon.

== Personal projects ==
Miglavs is developing and exhibiting the photo documentary Africa’s Undiscovered Myths & Archetypal Dreams. This aims to document the stories of Africa’s most remote indigenous tribes and to create photo illustrations from descriptions by chiefs, shamans, witch doctors and tribal elders.

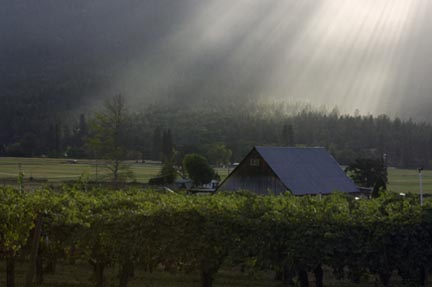
Sunlight breaking through storm clouds over Valley View Winery vineyard and barn in southern Oregon.

== Awards ==
Miglavs has created two books related to the wine industry. The most recent, Oregon: The Taste of Wine, won two awards, including the Benjamin Franklin Gold Medal for Best Regional book, and one of four finalists in the Gourmand World Book Awards for “Best Book on New World Wine.”

Work from his Africa’s Undiscovered Myths Project has been seen throughout the United States including at the United Nations, the Longview Museum of Fine Arts, and Portland State University.
