= Liezēre Parish =

Parish of Latvia

- parish of Latvia
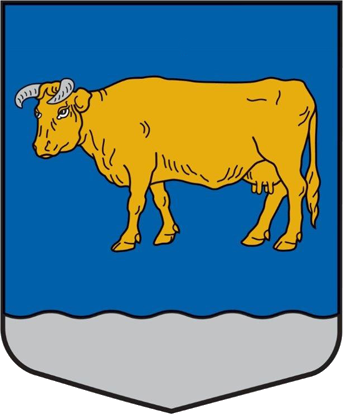
- Coat of arms

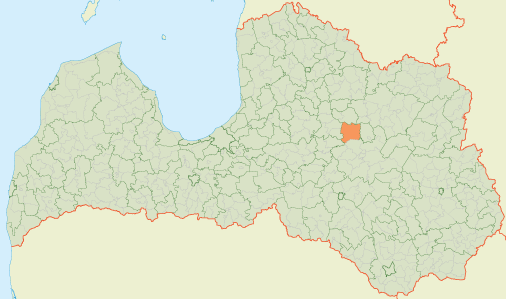
- 57°01′07″N 26°02′03″E

- Location within Latvia
- Country: Latvia

Area
  - Total: 255.03 km^{2} (98.47 sq mi)
  - Land: 246.71 km^{2} (95.26 sq mi)
  - Water: 8.32 km^{2} (3.21 sq mi)

Population (1 January 2026)
  - Total: 1,016
  - Density: 4.118/km^{2} (10.67/sq mi)
- Website: www.liezere.lv

Liezēre parish (Latvian: Liezēres pagasts) is an administrative unit of Madona Municipality in the Vidzeme region of Latvia.
