= Jānis Joņevs =

Latvian writer

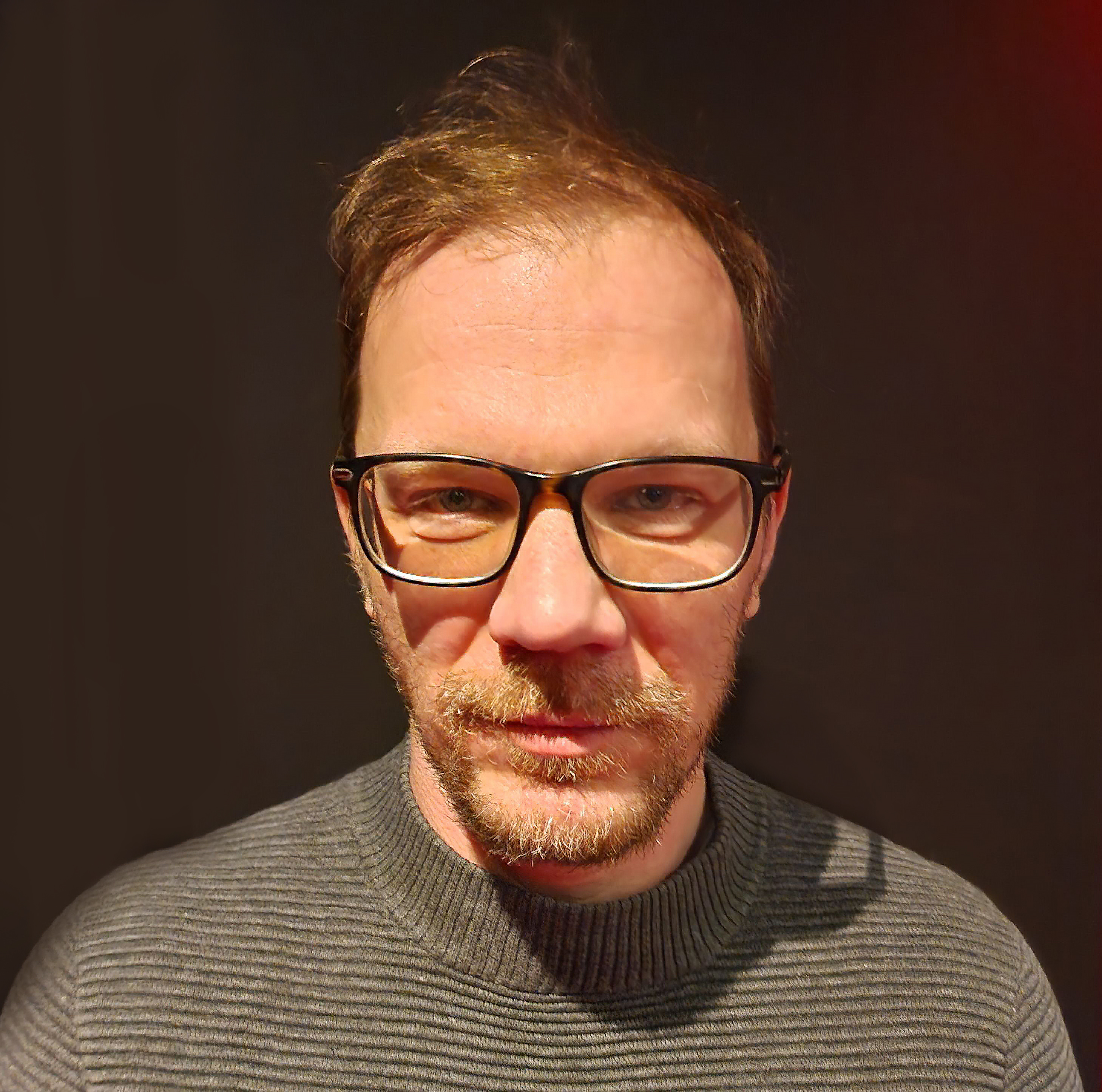
- Jānis Joņevs 2023 at filmclub Xenix, Zurich.
- Born: 21 March 1980 (age 46); Jelgava, Latvian SSR (Now Latvia)
- Education: Latvian Academy of Culture
- Occupations: Writer, translator
- Years active: 2002-present

Jānis Joņevs (born 21 March 1980 in Jelgava) is a Latvian writer, copywriter and translator from French. After studying at the local Gymnasium in Jelgava, he went to Riga for his higher education and earned a Master's degree from the Latvian Academy of Culture. Joņevs is best known for his debut novel Doom 94 (Jelgava 94) which was a bestseller upon its release in 2013. The book later won the European Union Prize for Literature. It was translated into many languages and made into a feature film.
