= Eleja Parish =

Parish of Latvia

- Coat of arms

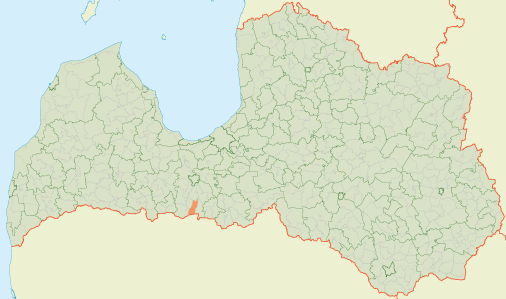
- Interactive map of Eleja Parish
- Coordinates: 56°25′15″N 23°42′17″E
- Country: Latvia
- Municipality: Jelgava

Area
  - Total: 66.7 km^{2} (25.8 sq mi)

Population (1 January 2026)
  - Total: 1,833
  - Density: 27.5/km^{2} (71.2/sq mi)
- Time zone: Eastern European Time

Eleja Parish (Latvian: Elejas pagasts) is an administrative unit of Jelgava Municipality in the Semigallia region of Latvia.

== Towns, villages and settlements of Eleja parish ==
- Apšukrogs
- Birzītes
- Eleja
- Mazeleja
- Ozolmuiža
- Sesavmuiža
- Volfārte
- Zizma
