= Dangerous Summer (film) =

2000 film directed by Aigars Grauba

- Directed by: Aigars Grauba
- Written by: Pauls Bankovskis; Andrejs Ēķis; Aigars Grauba
- Starring: Uldis Dumpis; Inese Cauna; Eduards Pāvuls; Jānis Reinis; Artūrs Skrastiņš
- Cinematography: Gints Bērziņš
- Edited by: Sandra Alksne; Aigars Bišofs
- Music by: Uģis Prauliņš
- Release date: 2000
- Country: Latvia
- Language: Latvian

Dangerous Summer (Latvian: Baiga vasara) is a 2000 Latvian film directed by Aigars Grauba starring Inese Cauna, Uldis Dumpis, Eduards Pāvuls, Jānis Reinis, and Artūrs Skrastiņš.

== Plot ==
Set in Riga, the capital of Latvia, the film tells a tragic love story before and during the Soviet occupation of Latvia in 1940 and the early stages of World War II. Roberts (Artūrs Skrastiņš), a radio journalist, falls in love with Baltic German student Isolde (Inese Cauna), who's about to be deported to Germany. Isolde is torn between her love for Roberts and her chance at escaping for Germany with the help of Latvian foreign minister Vilhelms Munters (Uldis Dumpis).
