= Ozolnieki Municipality =

Municipality of Latvia

Coordinates: 56°41′27″N 23°47′17″E

Ozolnieki Municipality Ozolnieku novads
- Municipality
- Flag Coat of arms

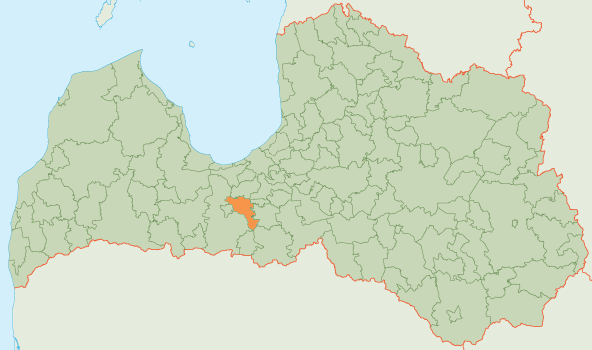
- Country: Latvia
- Formed: 2003
- Dissolved: 2021
- Centre: Ozolnieki

Government
  - Council Chair: Andris Ozoliņš (Latvian Association of Regions)

Area
  - Total: 286.17 km^{2} (110.49 sq mi)
  - Land: 273.54 km^{2} (105.61 sq mi)
  - Water: 12.63 km^{2} (4.88 sq mi)

Population (2021)
  - Total: 9,948
  - Density: 36.37/km^{2} (94.19/sq mi)
- Website: www.ozolnieki.lv

Ozolnieki Municipality (Latvian: Ozolnieku novads) is a former municipality in Semigallia, Latvia. The municipality was formed in 2003 by merging Ozolnieki Parish and Cena Parish; the administrative centre was Ozolnieki. In 2009, it absorbed Sidrabene parish (renamed in 2011 to Salgale Parish) of the former Jelgava district. In 2020, the population was 10,019.

On 1 July 2021, Ozolnieki Municipality was merged into Jelgava Municipality.

== Geography ==
The municipality was located in the north of Zemgale Plain. It shared borders with Olaine Municipality, Ķekava Municipality, Bauska Municipality, Iecava Municipality, Jelgava Municipality and the city of Jelgava. The centre of Ozolnieki Municipality – the town of Ozolnieki – was located 6 kilometers from Jelgava and 36 kilometers from Riga. The total area of the municipality was 286.1 km^{2}.

=== Villages ===
The municipality included the following villiages: Ozolnieki, Iecēni, Brankas, Glūdas, Raubēni, Āne, Tetele, Cenas, Dalbe, Emburga, Garoza, Jaunpēternieki, and Renceles.

=== Rivers ===
The main rivers in territory of the municipality were Lielupe, Iecava and Misa. From the smaller rivers, streams and canals the most important were: Cena, Garoze, Mazais Ragvēzis, Mizupīte, Renģele, Sidrabenīte, Sodzeris, Podzīte, Velnagrāvis, and Zaķstrauts.

=== Lakes and ponds ===
There were a number of artificial lakes in former claypits: Ozolnieku ezers near Ozolnieki, Džammu dīķis, Lieģu dīķis near Brankas, Senču dīķis, Ānes dīķis and Jāņa dīķis near Āne, Viesturu dīķis near Tetele, Libertu dīķis in Raubēni and Akmenscūciņu karjers near Emburga.

=== Swamps ===
A number of small swamps were located in the territory of municipality: Briežu purvs, Būdukalna tīrelis, Čauku purvs, Danču purvs, Ķempu purvs, Lāču purvs, Pēternieku purvs, Sērenu purvs and Vīlantu purvs.

== History ==
The origin of the name Ozolnieki most likely comes from Ozolmuiža (in German: Eckhofen or Paulsgnade), the manor house which was located within the territory of the modern Ozolnieki Municipality. In the age of the Duchy of Courland and Semigallia (1562–1791), Ozolmuiža belonged to its dukes. Amongst its owners was the most renowned of the duchy's Dukes - Jacob Kettler, who kept an aviary of hunting gyrfalcons on the manor farm; Jacob's son, Frederick Casimir Kettler, later expanded the aviary. After the Courland was annexed by the Russian empire, Ozolmuiža manor passed to the tsars of Russia. Tsar Paul I allotted it to the governor of Courland, Karl Wilhelm Driesen. Subsequent manor owners included a number of different families, the last of which were the von der Reckes (until the formation of the Republic of Latvia).

During the Latvian War of Independence (1919–1920), Ozolnieki municipality was the scene of several battles against the Bermontians. In 1937, a monument was unveiled in memory of the Latvian soldiers killed in action there.

After the founding of the Republic of Latvia (1918–1920) and passage of the act regarding the Reform of agricultural lands, all manors were divided and distributed to Latvian farmers. All the manor houses had been destroyed in the fighting of World War I and War of Independence; their building materials, mainly stones and bricks, were used to build new farmsteads. In 1936, there were 401 new farms, down from a peak of 481. Local industry included brick-making, textiles, clay mining, leather tanning, a sawmill, and other light industry.

Throughout the two decades of Latvian independence, there was an active social and culture life—two elementary schools, a choir, a dance collective, an amateur theatre, a local unit of the Aizsargi Home Guard, and other societies.

The Soviet occupations (first in 1940 and again in 1944–1991) did not spare Ozolnieki. In the mass deportations of 1949, the 42,000 Latvians deported on 25 March 1949 to Siberia included 18 inhabitants of the municipality. After those deportations, the USSR began to liquidate individual farms, forcing the formation of collective farms or kolkhozes. The kolhozes were given Soviet-inspired names such as “Sirpis un āmurs” (Sickle and Hammer), “Staļina ērglis″ (Stalin's eagle), and “Mičurina kolhozs” (Michurin's kolkhoz)—whose name includes a play on the diminutive of a Latvian word regarding bodily functions.

Several administrative reforms took place in Ozolnieki municipality after World War II: in 1945, the Soviets divided the municipality into three villages—Ozolnieki, Cena and Dalbe; in 1954, Ozolnieki village was liquidated and incorporated into Valgunde village, while Cena village was expanded, incorporating Tetele and Āne. Ozolnieki village was later incorporated into Cena village, but in 1979 was re-established as an urban village with autonomous administration (Latvian: pilsētciemats). After Latvia restored independence (1991), Ozolnieki and Cena retained their territories and were formed into parishes: Ozolnieki parish (Latvian: Ozolnieku pagasts) and Cena parish (Latvian: Cenu pagasts). In 2003, both parishes merged again into Ozolnieki municipality (Latvian: Ozolnieku novads) with its governmental centre in Ozolnieki. In 2009, in conjunction with the completion of the Administrative territorial reforms of Latvia, Ozolnieki municipality absorbed Sidrabene parish (since 2011: Salgale parish).

== Inhabitants ==
In July 2020, the population of the municipality was 10,726, with 72% being Latvians, 17% Russians, 3% Belarusians, 2% Lithuanians, 2% Ukrainians, 1% Poles, and 3% others.

== Education, culture and sport ==
There were three kindergartens, a secondary school, an elementary school, a music school, and the affiliates of the Baltic International Academy and The Higher School of Psychology located in the municipality. The Latvian Rural Advisory and Training Centre is located in Ozolnieki.

There were four libraries and two culture centres in the municipality.

In the centre of the former municipality of Ozolnieki is a sports centre, ice hall, and cable system for wakeboarding on Ozolnieki Lake. There are two volleyball teams (one plays in amateur league and the other – VK Ozolnieki/Poliurs – in the Baltic Schenker league), a motorcycle club, and a tug of war club. The ice hockey team, HK Ozolnieki/Monarhs, was also based in Ozolnieki.

== Notable sites ==
- Fortifications (redoubts) built by Napoleon's army during the invasion of the Russian empire (1812):
  - Silgrauži (Mazsilgrauži or Franči, too) redoubt — the best preserved redoubt in Latvia. It is located at the right bank of Iecava river, where it meets Misa river. The redoubt has four corners (12x12 m) for cannons, earthen ramparts (10–13 m wide), and a moat filled with water around it. The total area is almost 200 000 m^{2}.
  - Blukas krogs (or Bluķi) redoubt – located at the right bank of Iecava river, in a strategic place near the ferry of the old Riga-Jelgava road. The total area is approximately 8 000 m^{2}.
  - Namiķi redoubt – located at the meeting of Iecava river and Garoze river.
- Dalbe Lutheran church (built in 1869).
- Tetele (or Tetelminde) tower (built in 1895) – located at the Lielupe river in the park of ex-Tetelminde manor house.
- Auči manor house – built in 1926 as a residence of the family of the first president of Latvia Jānis Čakste.
- Stalgale Lutheran church, built in 2001.
- "Billītes" – Memorial house of the famous Latvian writer Edvarts Virza.

== Famous people ==
- Jānis Čakste (1859–1927) – the first President of Latvia (1922–1927)
- Edvarts Virza (1883–1940) – famous Latvian writer, poet, prosaist and publicist
- Fricis Apšenieks (1894–1941) – famous Latvian chess master
- Agris Neija (born in 1973) – Latvian motorsportist

== Gallery ==
Photos of Ozolnieki municipality

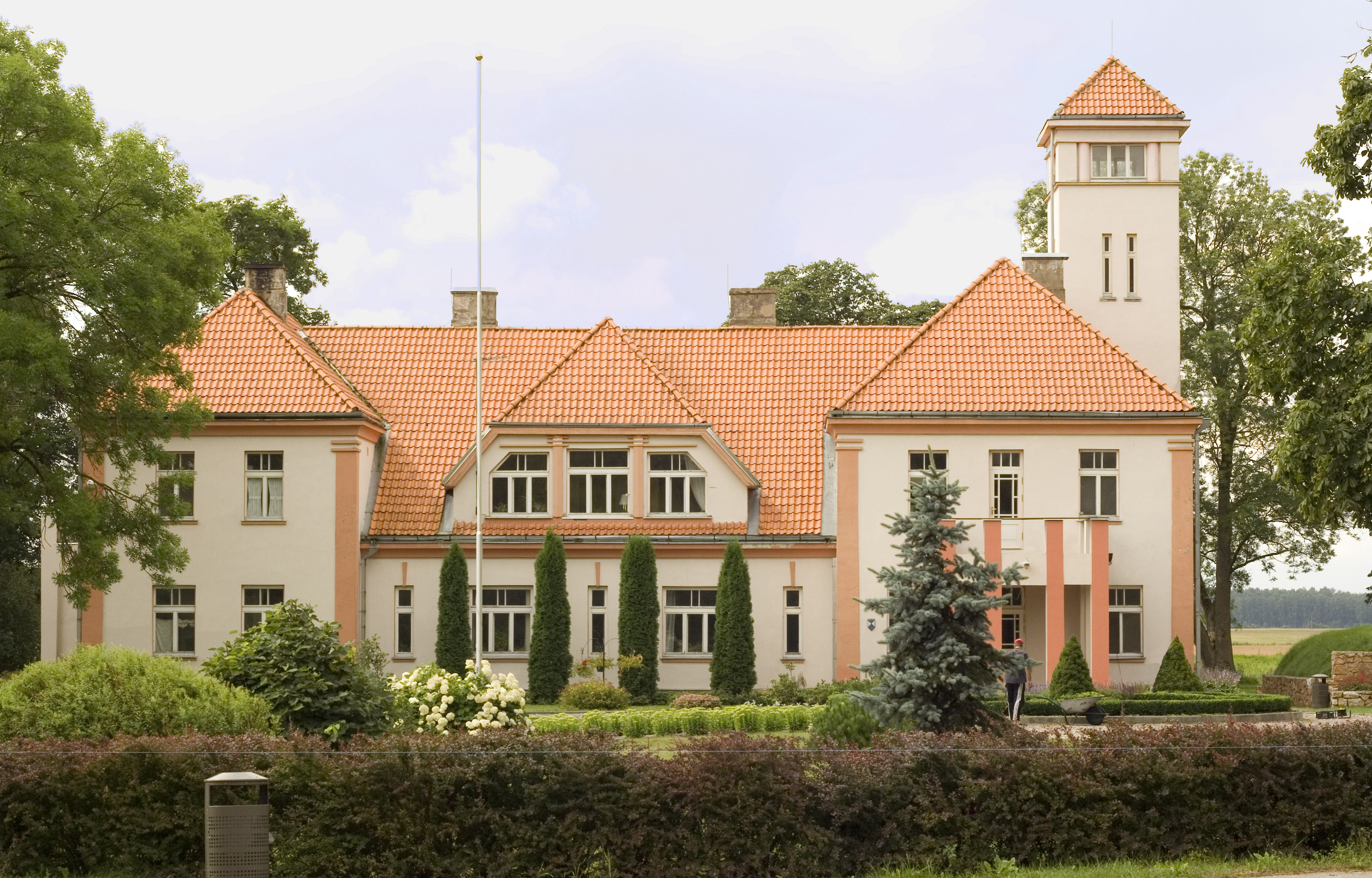
Auči manor house

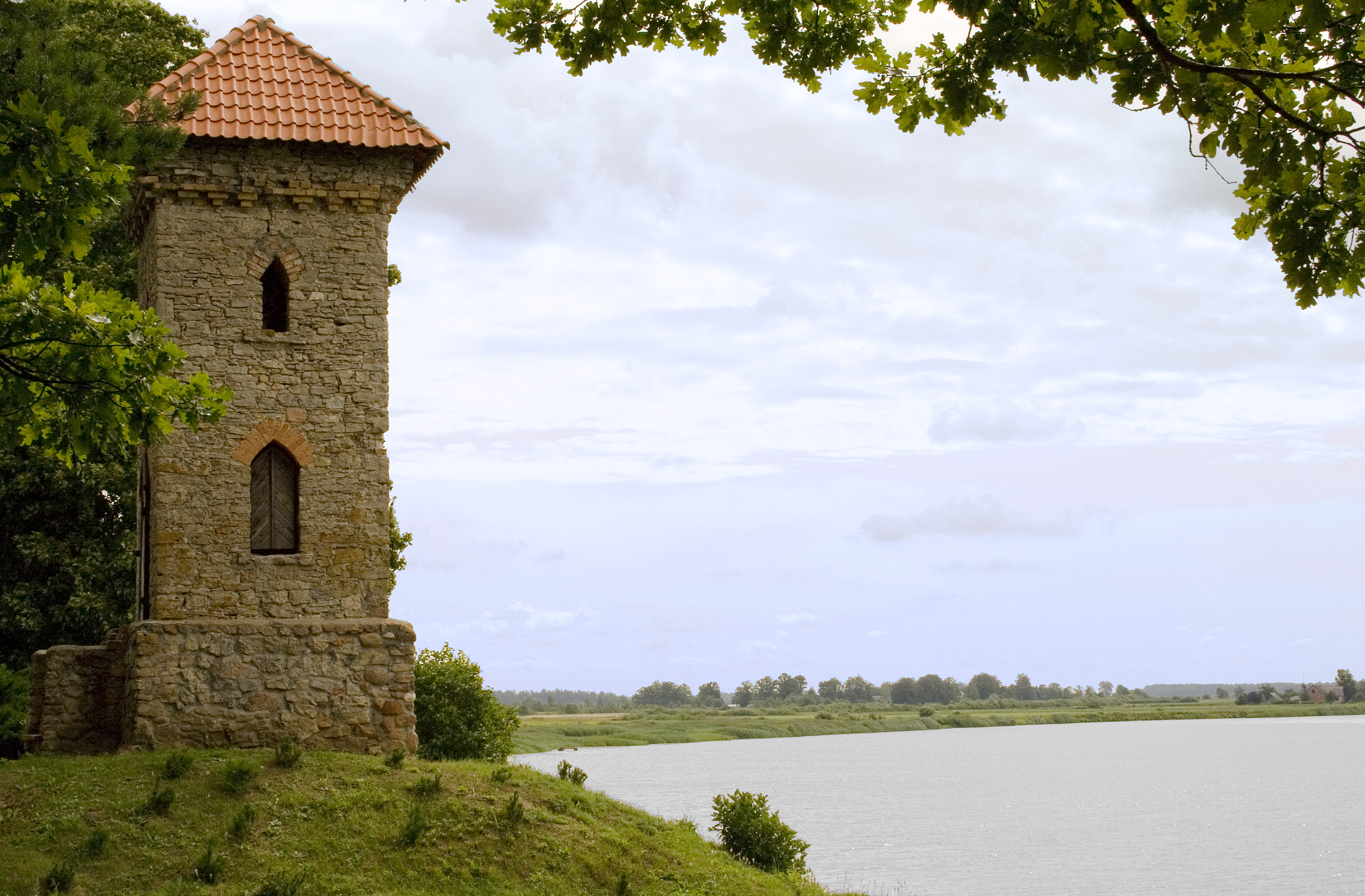
Tetelminde tower

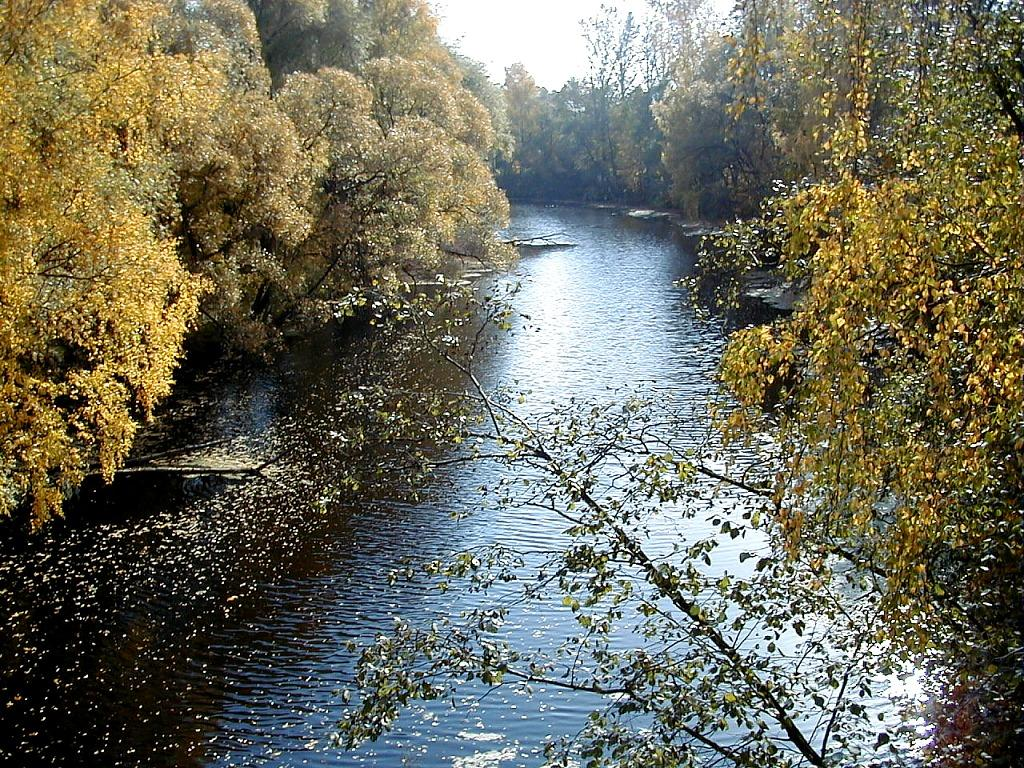
Iecava river near Ozolnieki village

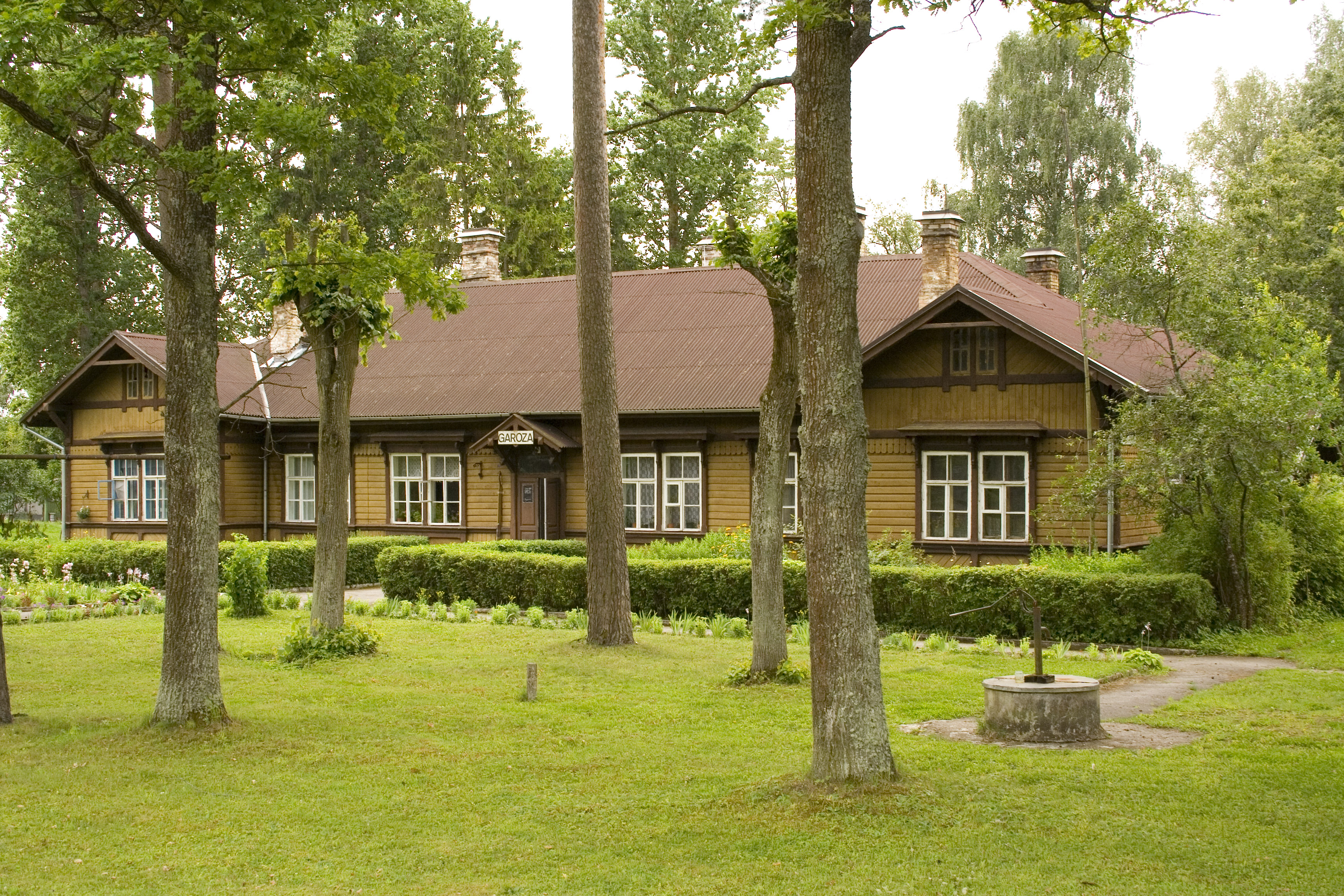
Garoza train station (built in 1906)

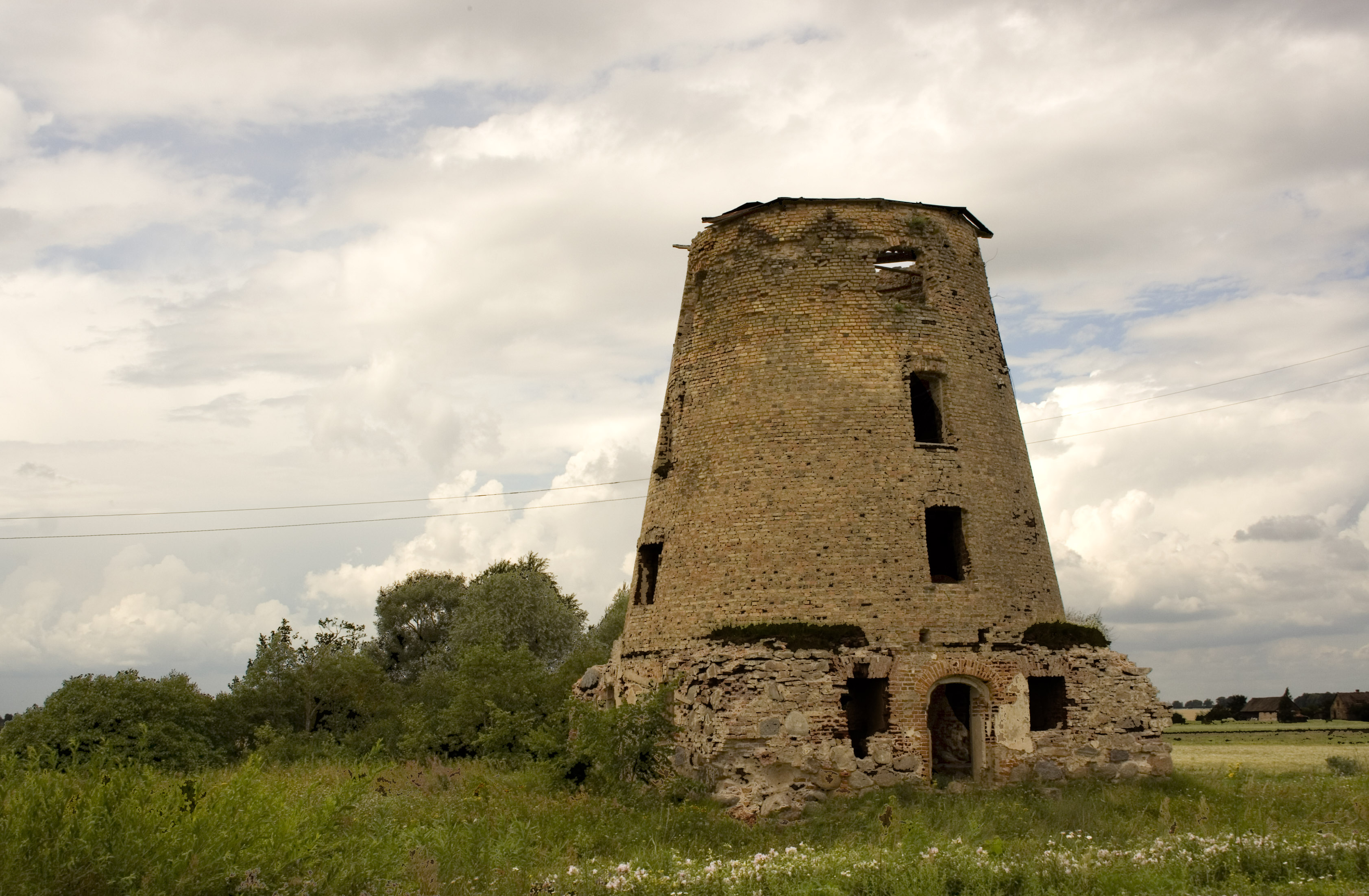
Ruins of old mills near Emburga village

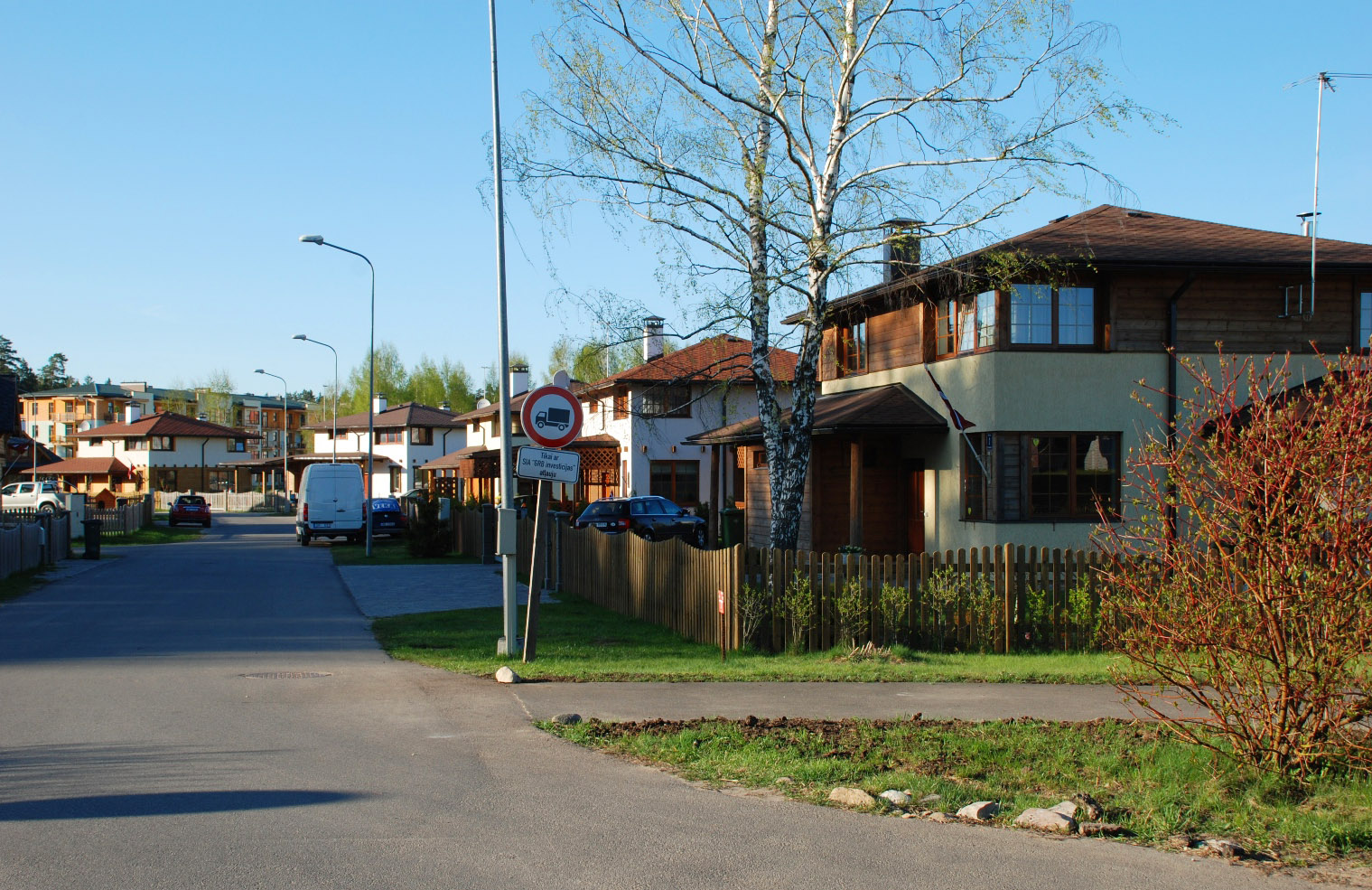
Street in Ozolnieki village

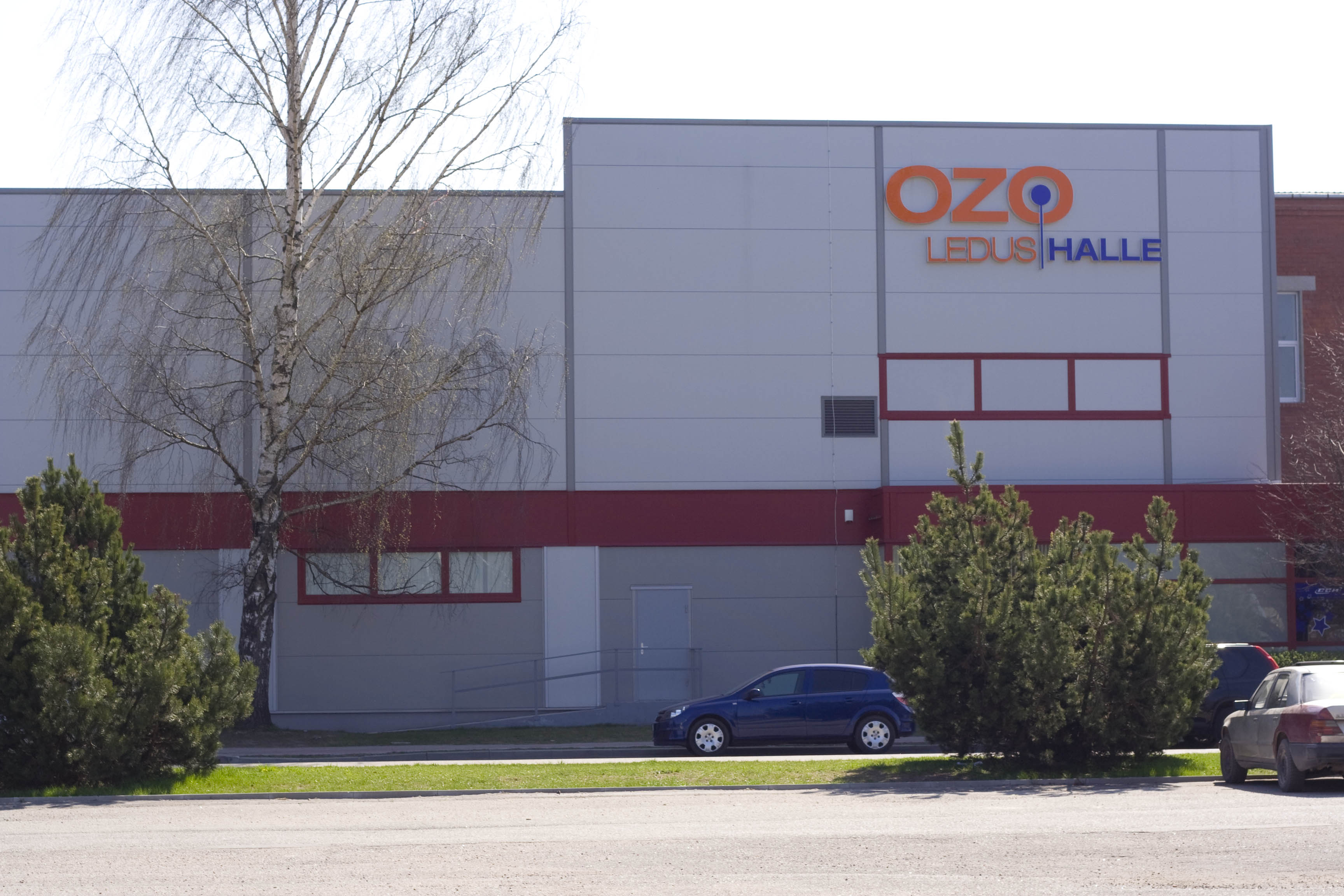
Ice Hall in Ozolnieki (built in 2008)

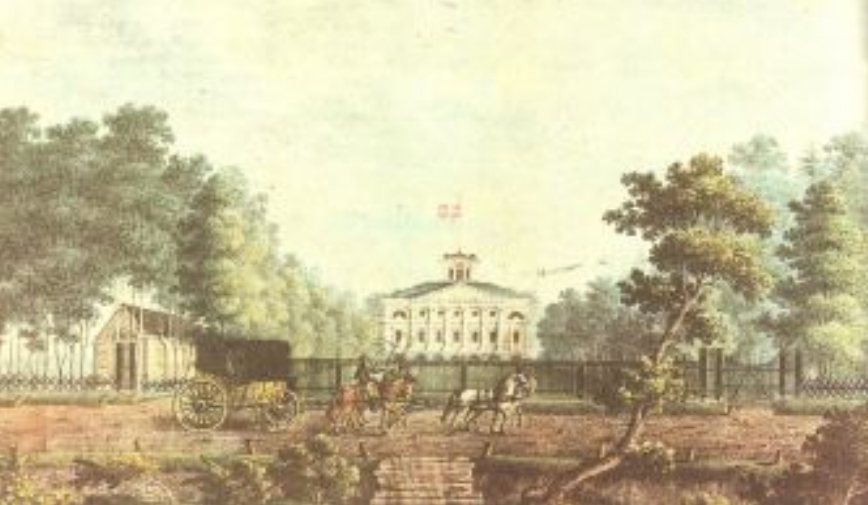
Cena manor house (around 1823)

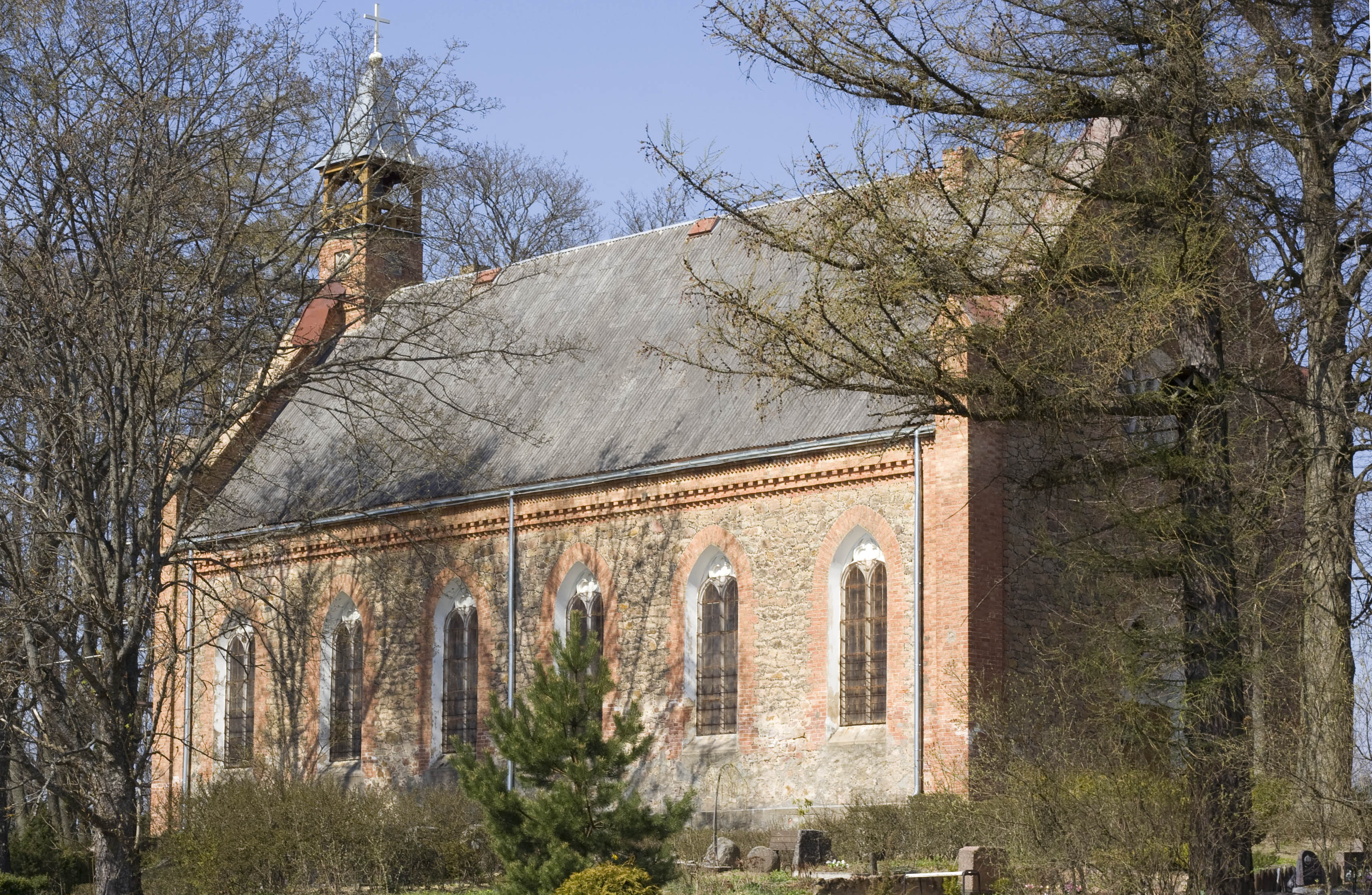
Dalbe Lutheran Church (built in 1869)

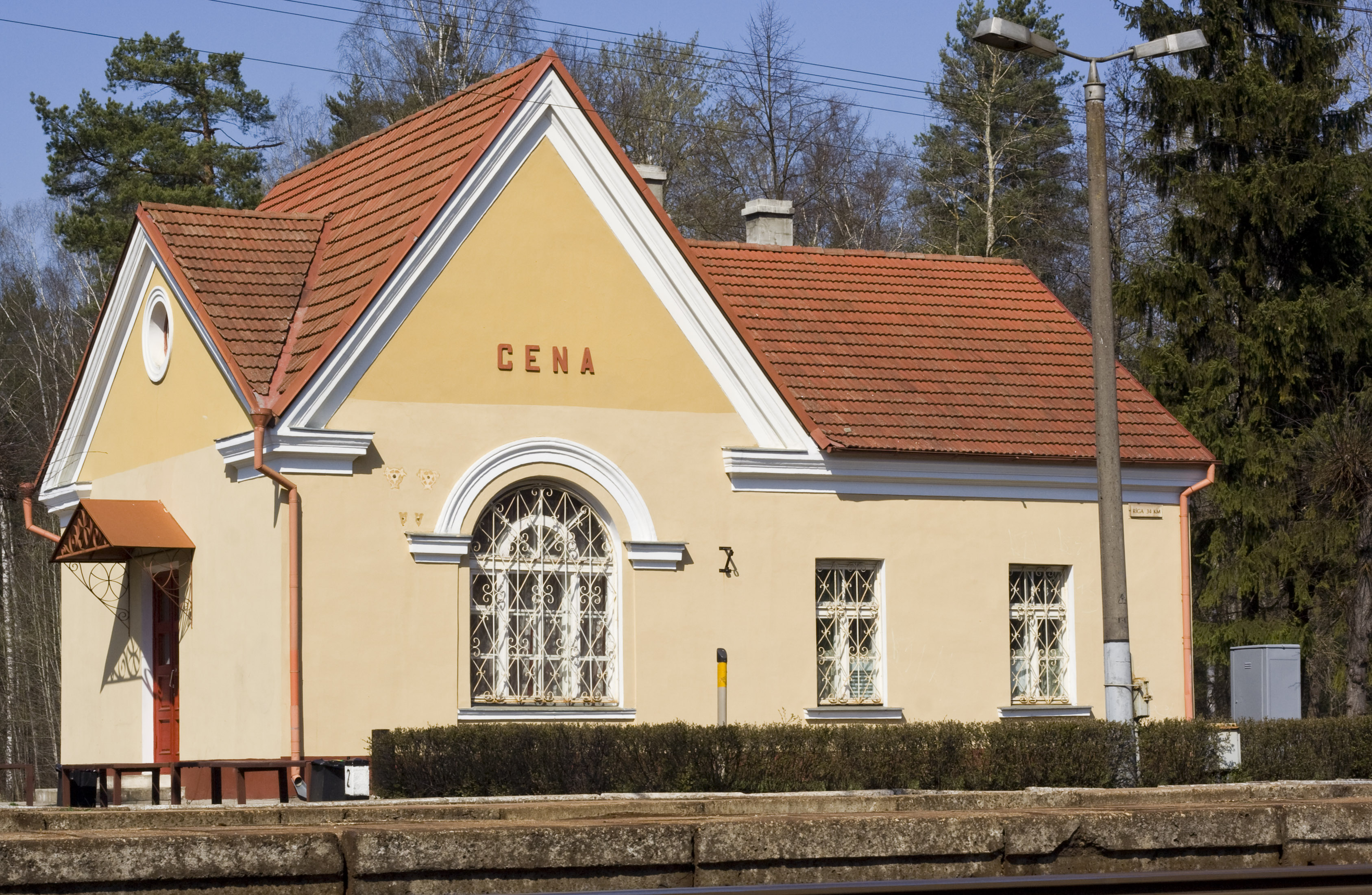
Cena railway station

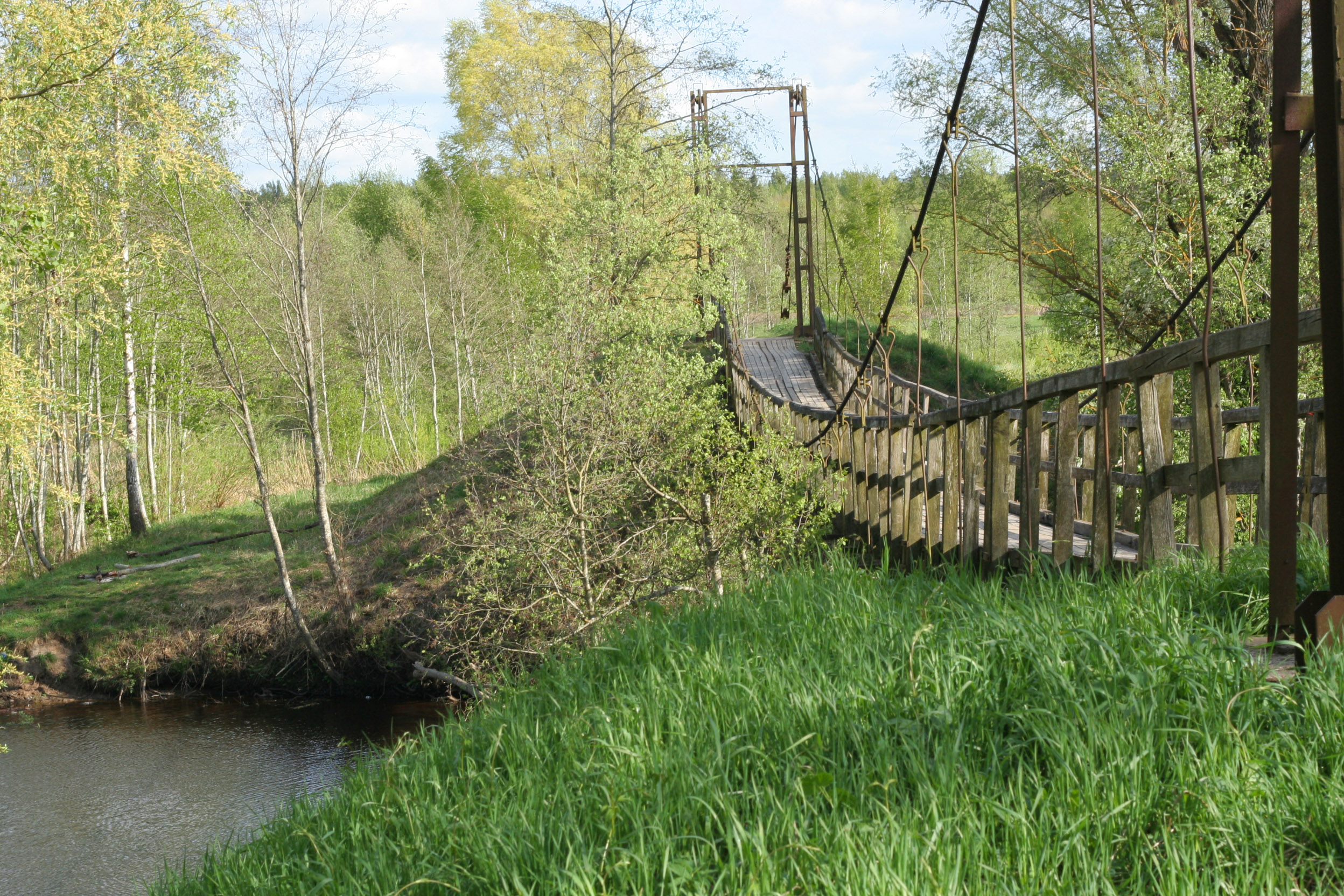
Cable bridge for pedestrians over Iecava river

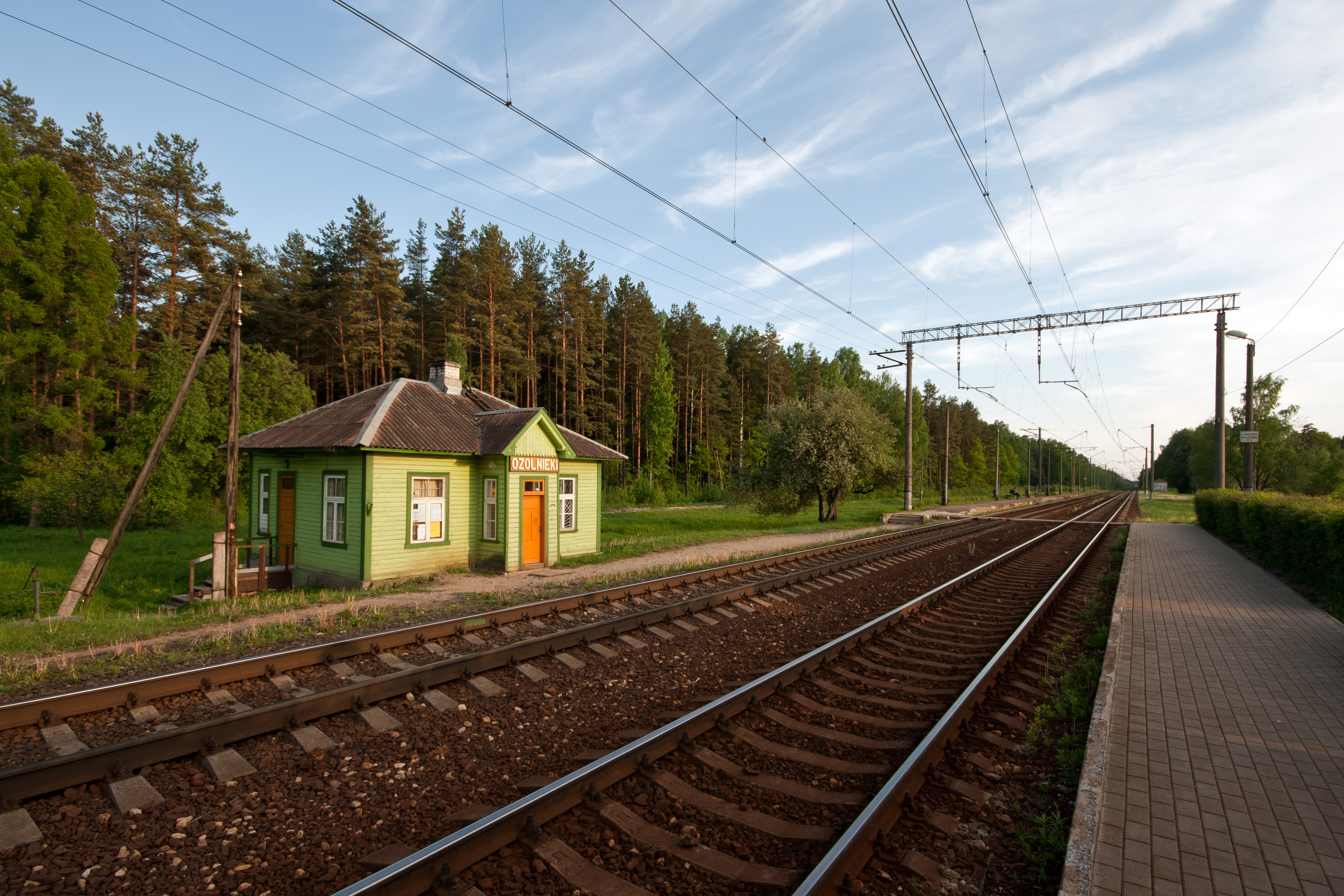
Ozolnieki railway station

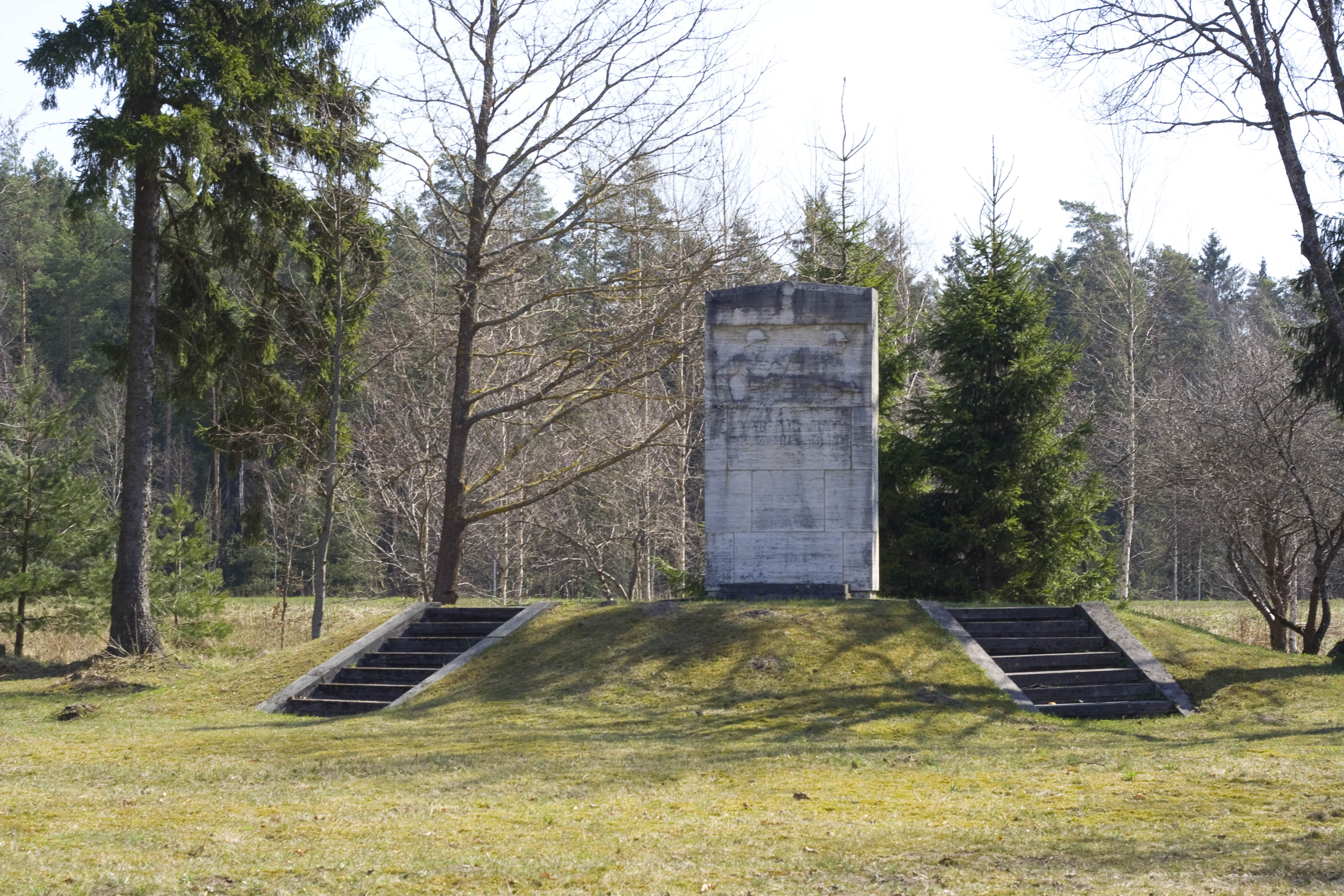
Monument to commemorate the Latvian soldiers killed in action during the Latvian Freedom War
