= Cena (disambiguation) =

Cena was the main meal of the day in ancient Rome.

Cena may also refer to:

== People ==
- John Cena (born 1977), American professional wrestler and actor
- Marcone Cena (born 1987), Brazilian footballer

== Geography ==
- Cena, Jelgava Municipality, a village in Latvia
- Cena Parish, an administrative unit of Jelgava Municipality in the Semigallia region of Latvia.
- Cena River, a river in Latvia

== In other languages ==
- The Spanish and Italian word for dinner
- The Portuguese word for scene
- The Czech and Slovak word for Price

== Other ==
- Cena (sign language), a language used by deaf inhabitants of Várzea Queimada, Brazil
- Cena N641, a bomb detection dog in the US Marines

== See also ==
- Cene (disambiguation)
