= Cene =

Cene may refer to:

== People ==
- Cene Marković (1864–1922), Serbian commander
- Cene Prevc (born 1996), Slovenian ski jumper
- Charles Le Cène (1647?–1703), French controversialist
- Ilhami Çene (1909–1977), Turkish fencer
- Michel-Charles Le Cène (1684–1743), French printer

== Places ==
- Cene, Lombardy, town in the province of Bergamo, Italy

== Other ==
- Clube Esportivo Nova Esperança, Brazilian football team

== See also ==
- Cena (disambiguation)
- Le Cène, a surname
