= Albert Schultens =

Dutch philologist (1686–1750)

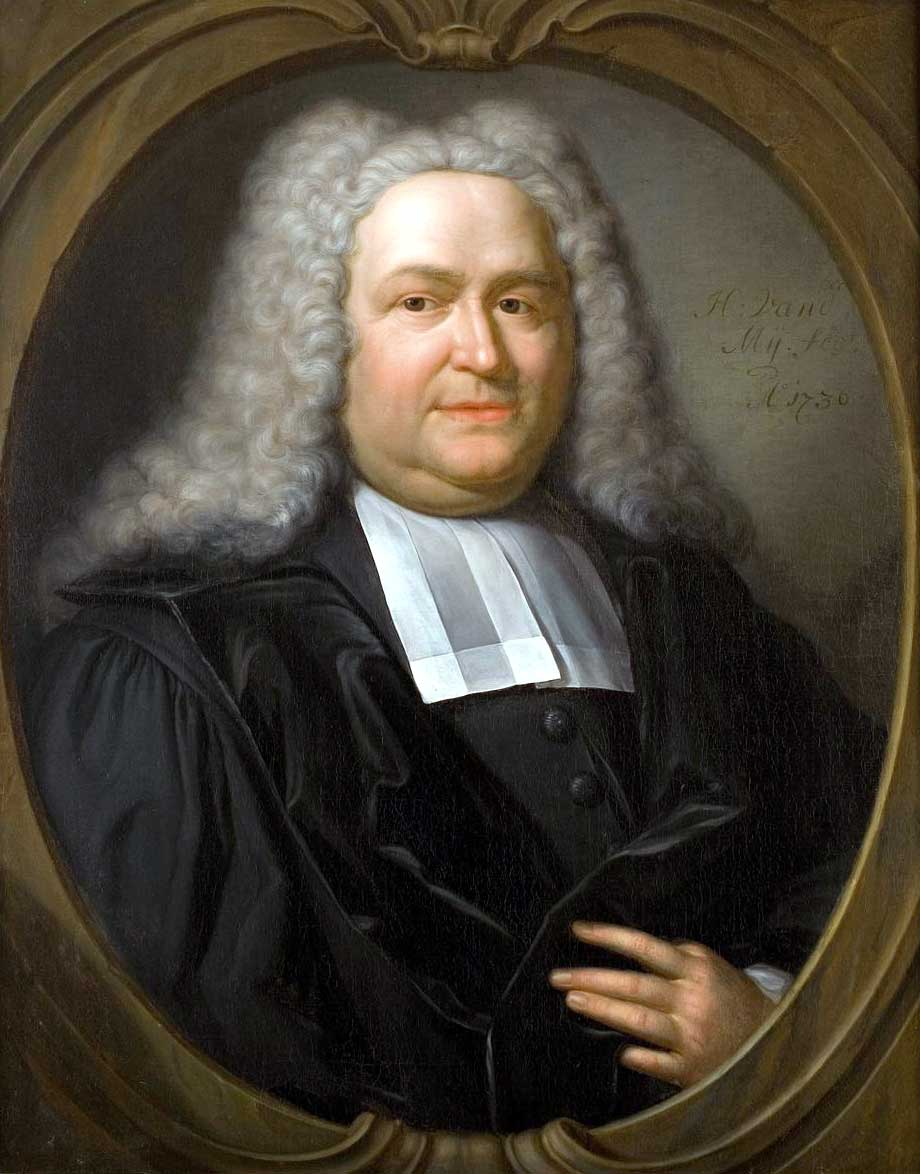
- Albert Schultens
- Born: 1686; Groningen, Dutch Republic
- Died: 26 January 1750; Leiden, Dutch Republic
- Education: University of Groningen, Leiden University
- Occupation(s): Philologist, theologian, orientalist
- Known for: Comparative Semitic philology, Arabic and Hebrew studies
- Notable work: Institutiones ad Fundumenta Linguæ Hebraicæ, Origines Hebraeae, Monumenta vetustiora Arabum

Albert Schultens (Dutch: [ˈɑlbərt ˈsxʏltəns]; 1686 – 26 January 1750) was a Dutch philologist.

== Biography ==
He was born at Groningen, where he studied for the church. He went on to the University of Leiden, applying himself specially to Hebrew and the cognate tongues. His thesis Dissertatio theologico-philologica de utilitate linguae Arabicae in interpretenda sacra lingua ("The Use of Arabic in the Interpretation of Scripture") appeared in 1706. After a visit to Reland in Utrecht, he returned to Groningen (1708); then, having taken his degree in theology (1709), he returned to Leiden, and devoted himself to the study of the manuscript collections there until 1711, when he became pastor at Wassenaer.

He disdained parochial work and decided to accept the Hebrew chair at Franeker in 1713. He held this position until 1729, when he was transferred to Leiden as rector of the collegium theologicum, or seminary for poor students. From 1732 until his death (at Leiden) he was professor of Oriental languages at Leiden.

Schultens was the chief teacher of the Arabic language in the whole of the Europe during his lifetime. In some sense, he revived Arabic studies. He differed from J. J. Reiske and Silvestre de Sacy in regarding Arabic as a handmaid to Hebrew. Reiske considered Schultens' treatment of Arabic to be of little value, also maintaining that Arabic studies should not be taught as part of theology, but as a subject matter in its own right, as was mathematics, physics, geography and medicine. Schultens vindicated the value of comparative study of the Semitic tongues against those who, like Jacques Gousset, regarded Hebrew as a sacred tongue with which comparative philology has nothing to do.

His principal works were Institutiones ad Fundumenta Linguæ Hebraicæ (1737), Origines Hebraeae (2 vols., 1724, 1738), a second edition of which, with the De defectibus linguae Hebraeae (1731), appeared in 1761; Job (1737); Proverbs (1748); Vetus et regia via hebraezandi (1738); and Monumenta vetustiora Arabum (1740). He left unfinished Institutiones Aramææ (1745–49).
