= Cena, Jelgava Municipality =

Village in Latvia

Cena
- Village
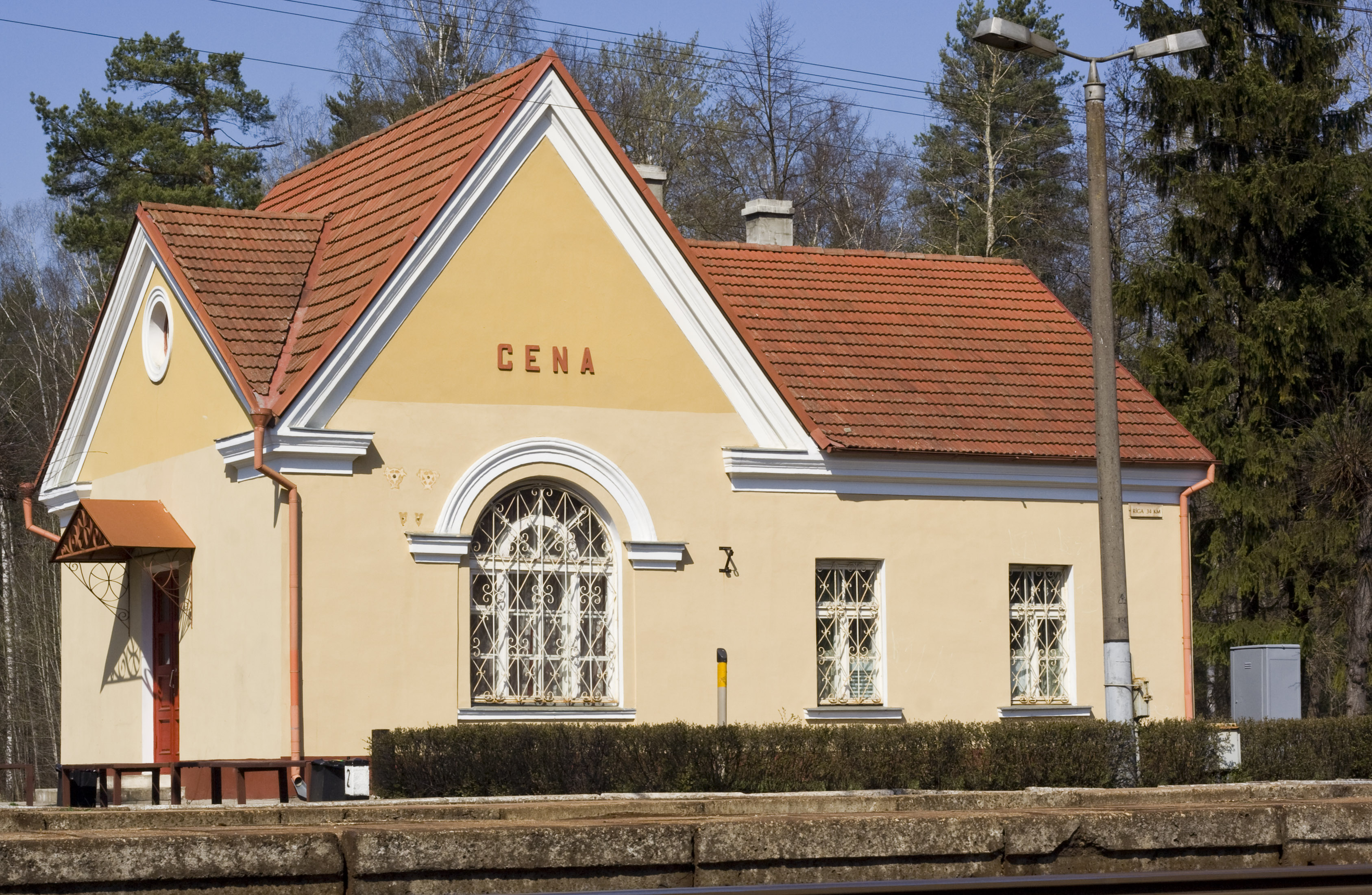
- Cena railway station

- Cena's location inside Latvia
- Coordinates: 56°43′7.20″N 23°49′57.10″E
- Country: Latvia
- Municipality: Jelgava
- Parish: Cena

Population (2005)
  - Total: 80

Cena (or Cenas) is a small village in Jelgava Municipality in the Semigallia region of Latvia (from 2009 until 2021, it was part of the former Ozolnieki Municipality). The village located at Misa River approximately 32 km from the capital Riga and 10 km from the city of Jelgava.
