= Adil Guliyev =

Soviet Azerbaijani flying ace (1922–1992)

- Adil Hüseyn oğlu Quliyev
- Born: 22 November 1922; Baku, TSFSR
- Died: 16 December 1992 (aged 70); Baku, Azerbaijan
- Burial place: Alley of Honor
- Military career
- Allegiance: Soviet Union
- Branch: Soviet Air Force
- Service years: 1941–1966
- Rank: Colonel
- Unit: 65th Guards Fighter Aviation Regiment
- Conflicts: World War II
- Awards: Hero of the Soviet Union

Adil Huseyn oghlu Guliyev (Azerbaijani: Adil Hüseyn oğlu Quliyev; Russian: Адиль Гусейн оглы Кулиев, romanized: Adil' Guseyn ogly Kuliyev; 22 November 1922–16 December 1992) was an Azerbaijani fighter pilot in the Soviet Air Force who became a flying ace with twenty shootdowns during the Second World War. A recipient of the title Hero of the Soviet Union for his feats, he remained in the Soviet Air Force and retired with the rank of colonel in 1966. Later he became a director of Baku Airport.

== Early life ==
Guliyev was born on 22 November 1922 in Baku to a peasant family. He graduated from either School No. 14 or School No. 132 in Baku. He participated in the activities of the Baku Flying Club.

== World War II ==
In 1941 he was drafted into the Red Army. In April he became a student at the Stalingrad Military Aviation School, from which he graduated in the following year. On 7 July 1942 Guliyev became a sergeant in the 8th Reserve Fighter Aviation Regiment. From October 1942, Guliyev fought in combat, flying the Yakovlev Yak-7. He served in the 653rd Fighter Aviation Regiment (which became the 65th Guards Fighter Aviation Regiment). It was part of the 274th Fighter Aviation Division, which became the 4th Guards Fighter Aviation Division. Guliyev fought in missions over Velikiye Luki in November 1942.

In the winter of 1943, the regiment was deployed to the Northwestern Front in the Demyansk Pocket area. In 1943, Guliyev became a Communist Party of the Soviet Union member. On 6 March, Guliyev claimed his first victory, a Bf 109. On 14 March, in the Staraya Russa area, he was attacked by four Fw 190s. Guliyev downed one but his plane was shot down. He bailed out and was rescued by Soviet troops close to the front line. On 15 March he was awarded the Order of the Red Star. Shortly afterwards, the aviation division was transferred to the reserve south of Moscow. There the regiment and division became guards units. In May Guliyev flew missions over Bryansk, by which time he was a junior lieutenant and then a lieutenant. He fought in the Battle of Kursk, during which he made 51 sorties and shot down three Fw 190s. He received his first Order of the Red Banner on 9 October. The 65th Guards IAP was pulled out of combat in early October to receive the new Yakovlev Yak-9 fighter.

From 30 November, Guliyev's unit was part of the 1st Baltic Front. The regiment became part of the 3rd Belorussian Front on 21 June 1944. During the month of June Guliyev made 34 sorties and shot down four fighters and a bomber. During the month Guliyev and his unit covered the attack of the 3rd Belorussian Front towards Orsha, conducted aerial reconnaissance and blocked German airfields. On 23 June Guliyev shot down an Fw 190. By this time he was a senior lieutenant. By the end of summer 1944 he had shot down 15 German aircraft. On 10 July, with his flight over Vilnius, Guliyev reportedly attacked a German formation of 17 bombers with fighter over. Guliyev shot down an Fw 190 and a Ju 87 during the battle. On 21 July 1944 Guliyev was awarded a second Order of the Red Banner for this action. At the end of July the regiment became part of the 1st Baltic Front again. He was awarded the Order of the Patriotic War 1st class on 19 August. By 10 September, he had reportedly made 141 sorties, participated in 38 air battles, and shot down fifteen enemy aircraft. On 17 September, Guliyev was awarded a third Order of the Red Banner.

In February 1945 the regiment was moved to Memel, covering the 1st Baltic Front. Guliyev became a captain and deputy squadron commander and navigator in the regiment. On 21 February he shot down an Fw 190. On 23 February 1945 he was awarded the title Hero of the Soviet Union and the Order of Lenin. In March the regiment, then based at Šiauliai, began retraining on the Yakovlev Yak-3. On 19 April, the regiment joined the rest of the division in the Berlin Offensive. By the end of the war, Guliyev had shot down twenty German aircraft in 265 sorties and 64 air battles. On 31 July 1945 Guliyev was awarded the Order of Alexander Nevsky for his actions.

== Postwar ==
After the end of the war, Guliyev continued to serve with the Soviet Air Force and graduated from the Air Force Academy in 1956. He became a deputy commander and later commanded an aviation regiment. He retired as a colonel in 1966 and lived in Baku. He worked as a director of Baku Airport and later was department head in the Azerbaijan Consumer Society. Guliyev published two books of memoirs, "До встречи в Берлине", or "See you in Berlin" in 1975 and Есть пламя!, or "There are flames!" in 1985, respectively. On 6 April 1985 he received the Order of the Patriotic War 1st class a second time on the 40th anniversary of the end of World War II. Guliyev died on 16 December 1992 and was buried in the Alley of Honor. For his service to the Soviet Union, he received the Order of Lenin, Order of the Red Banner, Order of Alexander Nevsky, Order of the Patriotic War and the Order of the Red Star.

== List of victories ==
The data in this list is from Mikhail Bykov.

No.	Date	Foe	Place
1	6 March 1943	Bf 109	Teremovo
2	14 March 1943	Fw 190	Zhukovo
3	2 August 1943	Fw 190	Myuz-Talyzino
4	4 August 1943	Fw 190	Kofanovo
5	10 September 1943	Fw 190	Foshnya-Zhukovka
6	4 January 1944	Fw 190	Shumilino
7	23 June 1944	Fw 190	Orekhi
8	29 June 1944	Fw 190	Lyakhovka
9	10 July 1944	Fw 190	Stropyshki
10	10 July 1944	Ju 87	Olona
11	28 July 1944	Fw 190	Tetele
12	28 July 1944	Fw 190	Feldmanni
13	25 August 1944	Fw 190	Northeast of Auce
14	3 September 1944	Fw 190	East of Kuldīga
15	15 September 1944	Fw 190	Plechi
16	15 September 1944	Fw 190	Yurdiny
17	15 September 1944	Fw 190	Raykali
18	16 September 1944	Fw 190	Konkeri
19	14 October 1944	Fw 190	Kaufmanns
20	21 February 1945	Fw 190	Cerna

== Awards ==
- Hero of the Soviet Union
- Order of Lenin
- Three Order of the Red Banner
- Order of Alexander Nevsky
- Two Order of the Patriotic War 1st class
- Order of the Red Star
- campaign and jubilee medals
