= Le Cène =

Le Cène is a surname. Notable people with the name include:

- Charles Le Cène (1647?–1703), French Huguenot controversialist
- Michel-Charles Le Cène (1684–1743), French-Dutch printer and publisher of musical scores

== See also ==
- Cene (disambiguation)
