= Āne =

Village in Latvia

- Village
- Āne's location inside Latvia
- Coordinates: 56°38′49.52″N 23°48′44.42″E
- Country: Latvia
- Municipality: Jelgava
- Parish: Cena
- Elevation: 2 m (6.6 ft)

Population (2005)
  - Total: 1,780

Āne is a large village in Cena Parish, Jelgava Municipality in the Semigallia region of Latvia. The village is located on the Lielupe River approximately 38 km from the capital city of Riga and 7 km from city of Jelgava. It is known for the amount of clay that is dug up in local lakes. There is a brick factory, which was very prominent during the Soviet era; since the factory was privatised it still produces bricks albeit on a reduced scale. The town was very well known in the Soviet Union due to this. It is sometimes referred to by locals as "Sarkanais māls" literally meaning "Red clay".
