= Dalbe =

Village in Latvia

- Village
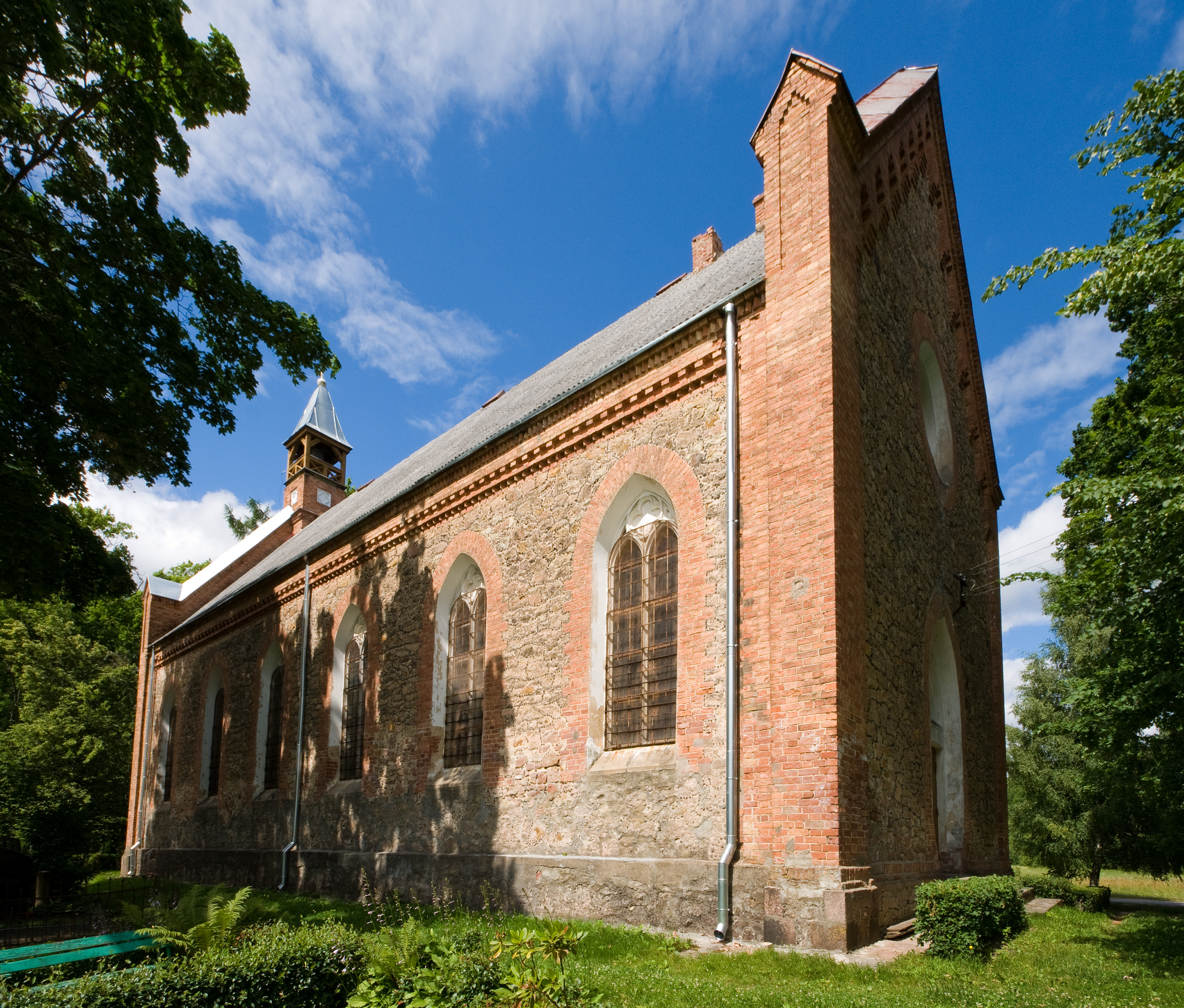
- Dalbe Lutheran church

- Dalbe's location inside Latvia
- Coordinates: 56°44′33″N 23°53′32″E
- Country: Latvia
- Municipality: Jelgava
- Parish: Cena

Population (2005)
  - Total: 110
- Postal code: LV-3018

Dalbe is a village in Cena Parish, Jelgava Municipality in the Semigallia region of Latvia. The village located at Misa river approximately 28 km from the capital Riga and 14 km from the city of Jelgava.
