= Pierre Allix =

French Protestant pastor and author

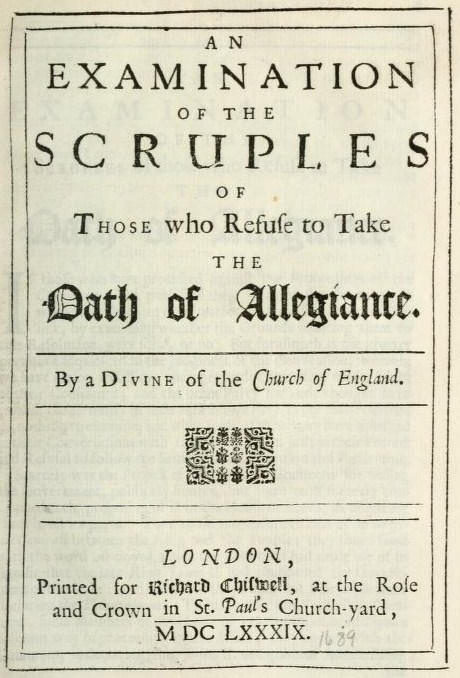
- Title page of An Examination of the Scruples of those who refuse to take the Oaths, 1689
- Born: 5 December 1640; Alençon
- Died: 3 March 1717 (aged 76); London
- Education: Academy of Saumur & Academy of Sedan
- Occupations: Pastor and author

Pierre Allix (1641 – 3 March 1717) was a French Protestant pastor and author. In 1690 Allix was created Doctor of Divinity by Emmanuel College, Cambridge, and was given the treasurership and a canonry in Salisbury Cathedral by Bishop Gilbert Burnet. He discovered that Codex Ephraemi is a palimpsest.

== Life ==
Born in 1641 in Alençon, France, he became a pastor first at Saint-Agobile Champagne, and then at Charenton, near Paris. The revocation of the Edict of Nantes in 1685 compelled him to take refuge in London. There he set up a church in Jewin Street, Aldersgate. He was the most celebrated Huguenot preacher of the 1680s in England, closely associated with Charles Le Cène, and known to advocate religious toleration.

In 1690 Allix was created Doctor of Divinity by Emmanuel College, Cambridge, and was given the treasurership and a canonry in Salisbury Cathedral by Bishop Gilbert Burnet.

Allix discovered that Codex Ephraemi is a palimpsest. He died in London. He had a large personal library which was sold by retail sale upon his death.

== Works ==
The numerous works of Allix were in French, Latin, and English. They are chiefly of apologetic character. Against Jacques-Benigne Bossuet he published Some Remarks upon the Ecclesiastical History of the Ancient Churches of Piedmont (1690), and Remarks upon the Ecclesiastical History of the Ancient Churches of the Albigenses (1692), with the idea of showing that the Albigensians were not Manichaeans, but historically identical with the Waldenses. They were as follows:

- Reponse à la Dissertation par Bertram, et Jean Scott, ou Erigene, 1670.
- Ratramme, ou Bertram Prêtre; du corps et du sang du Seigneur, 1672.
- Dissertatio de Trisagii origine, 1674.
- Dissertatio de Sanguine Domini Nostri Jesu Christi.
- Dissertatio de Tertulliani vita et scriptis.
- Les Malheurs de l'impenitence, sermon de jeune, sur Proverbes i. 24–28, prononcé à Charenton en 1675.
- Les devoirs du Saint Ministère, sermon de consecration, sur Tit. ii. 7, 8, prononcé à Charenton en 1676.
- Dissertatio de Conciliorum quorumvis definitionibus ad examen revocandis, 1680.
- Anastasii Sinaiticæ anagogicarum contemplationum in Hexahemeron lib. xii. 1682.
- Défense de la Réformation, sermon sur Jeremie v. 16, prononcé à Charenton en 1682.
- Douze Sermons de P. A. sur divers textes, 1685.
- Determinatio F. Joannis Parisiensis de modo existendi corporis Christi in sacramento altaris, 1686 (arguing that the Church of Rome did not hold transubstantiation before the Council of Trent).
- Les maximes du vrai Chrétien, 1687.
- L'Adieu de St. Paul aux Ephesiens, 1688. This sermon was intended to be preached at Charenton on the day on which the church was closed.
- A Discourse concerning Penance, 1688.
- A Discourse concerning the Merit of Good Works, 1688.
- An Historical Discourse concerning the Necessity of the Minister's Intention in administering the Sacrament, 1688.
- Reflections upon the Books of the Holy Scripture to establish the Truth of the Christian Religion, two vols. (the first published in French, 1687, the second in English, 1688).
- Preparation for the Lord's Supper, 1688.
- An Examination of the Scruples of those who refuse to take the Oaths, 1689.
- Some Remarks upon the Ecclesiastical History of the ancient Church of Piedmont, 1690.
- Remarks upon the Ecclesiastical History of the Albigenses, 1692. (In these two books Allix tried to prove that the Waldenses and Albigenses had preserved the truth unchanged from apostolic times.)
- The Judgment of the ancient Jewish Church against the Unitarians, 1689. (He argues that the Jews always held the divinity of their expected Messiah.)
- De Messiæ duplice Adventu. (Argues that the Second Coming would be in 1720, or at latest 1736.)
- Animadversions on Mr. Hill's Vindication of the Primitive Fathers against Reverend Gilbert, 1695.
- Dissertatio in Tatianum.
- Preface and Arguments on the Psalms, 1701.
- Nectarii Patriarchæ Hierosolymitani Confutatio Imperii Papæ, 1702.
- Augustini Hermanni Franche [of Halle] Manuductio ad lectionem SS. edita studio P. A., 1706.
- Dissertatio de Domini Nostri anno et mense natali, 1707.
- A Confutation of the Hopes of the Jews, 1707.
- Prophecies applied by Mr. Whiston, &c., considered, 1707.
- An Examination of Several Scripture Prophecies: Which the Reverend M.W. Hath Applyed to the Times After the Coming of the Messiah, 1707. In it Allix argues that Protestant support for the Restoration of the Jews to Palestine is ill-founded.
- Reflexions critiques et théologiques sur la controversie de l'Eglise (no date).
