= Brankas =

Village in Latvia

- Village
- Brankas location inside Latvia
- Coordinates: 56°40′57.77″N 23°50′13.81″E
- Country: Latvia
- Municipality: Jelgava
- Parish: Cena

Population (2005)
  - Total: 950

Brankas is a village in Cena Parish, Jelgava Municipality in the Semigallia region of Latvia, situated approximately 37 km from the capital city of Riga and 11 km from the city of Jelgava. The village grew substantially during the Soviet era when its name was Lielupe. It is the administrative centre of the Cena Parish.
