= Jaunpēternieki =

Village in Latvia

- Village
- Jaunpēternieki location inside Latvia
- Coordinates: 56°43′49.02″N 23°55′23.62″E
- Country: Latvia
- Municipality: Jelgava
- Parish: Cena

Population (2005)
  - Total: 70

Jaunpēternieki is a village in Cena Parish, Jelgava Municipality in the Semigallia region of Latvia. It is located approximately 31 km from the capital Riga and 17 km from the city of Jelgava. Its population in 2005 was 70.
