= Emburga =

Village in Latvia

- Village
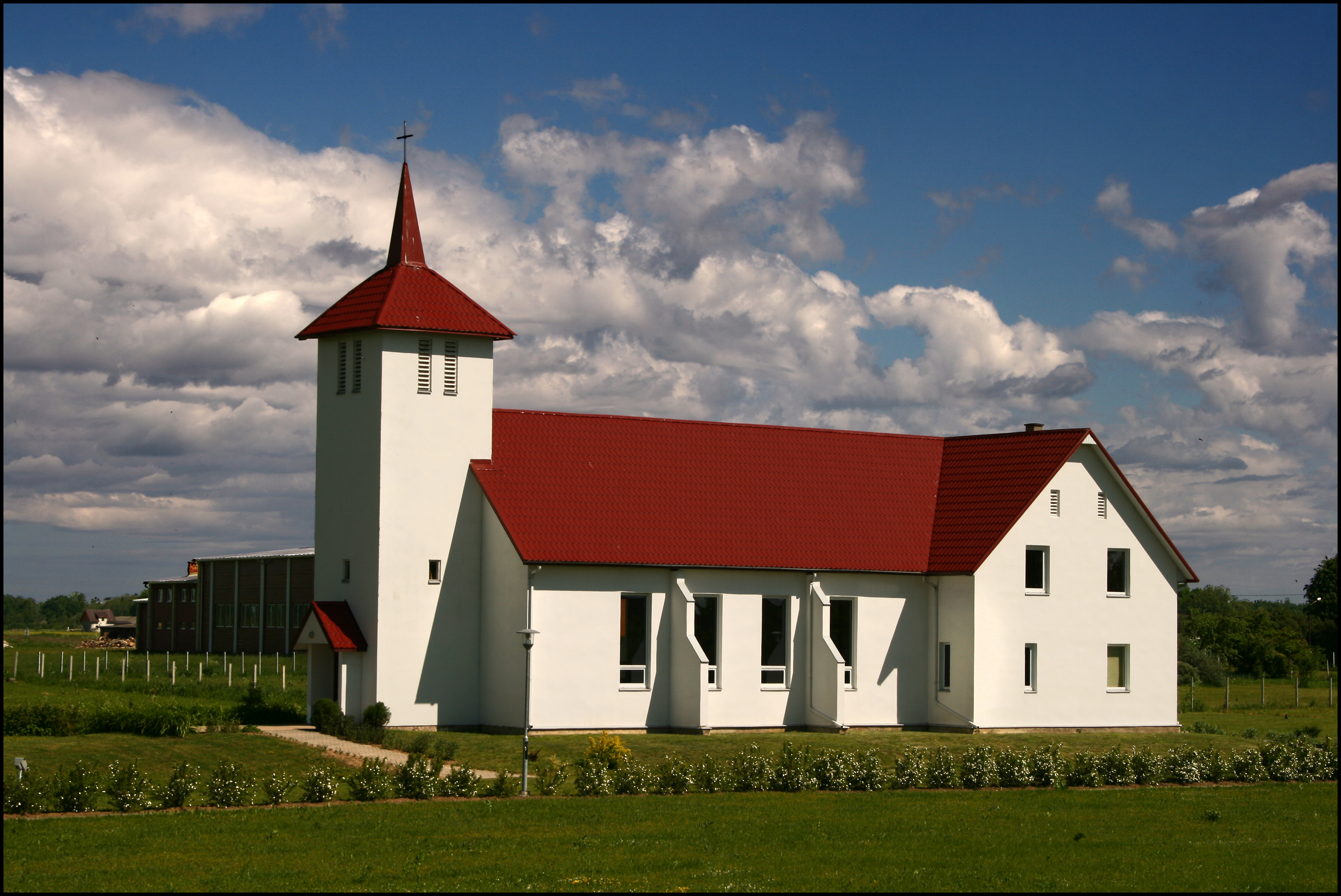
- Church in Emburga

- Emburga's location inside Latvia
- Coordinates: 56°33′56.34″N 23°58′52.08″E
- Country: Latvia
- Municipality: Jelgava
- Parish: Salgale

Population (2005)
  - Total: 333

Emburga is a village in Salgale Parish, Jelgava Municipality in the Semigallia region of Latvia. The village is located at Lielupe river approximately 22 km from the city of Jelgava.
