= Cenas tīrelis =

Bog and a protected area in Latvia

- IUCN category IV (habitat/species management area)
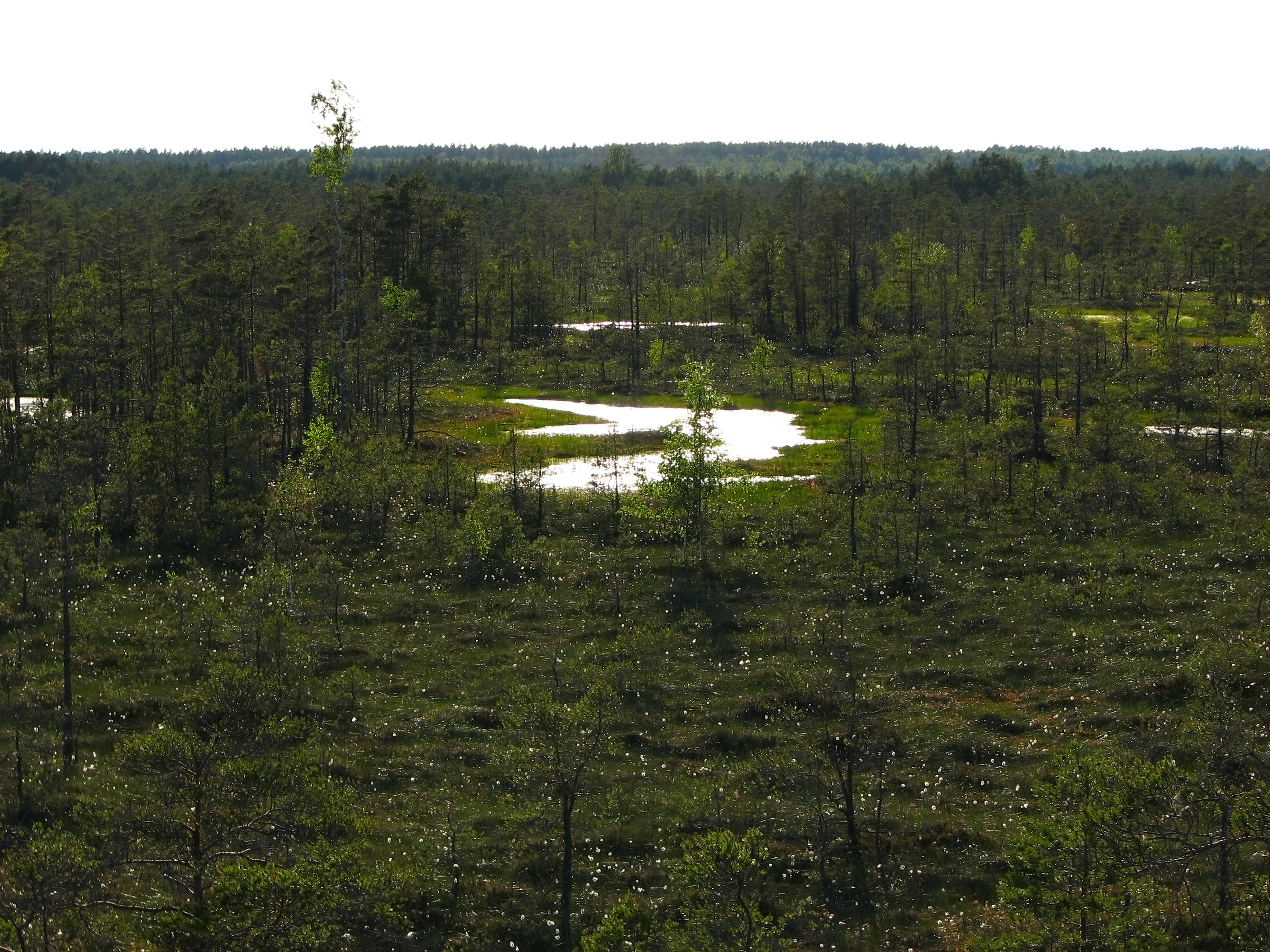
- Cenas tirelis bog

- Location within Latvia
- Location: Latvia
- Coordinates: 56°51′00″N 23°52′00″E
- Area: 22.96 km^{2} (5,670 acres)
- Established: 1999

The Cenas tīrelis is a bog located in the municipalities of Mārupe and Olaine, approximately 30 kilometers west of Riga, Latvia. It is a Natura 2000 protected site and one of Latvia's 261 nature reserves. It was formed 5000 years ago.

The bog has a total size of 6,000 ha, mostly occupied by the nature reserve and an active peat extraction site. The Cenas tirelis bog is the second largest peatland in Latvia, after the Teiči Nature Reserve, which has a total size of 19,779 ha. The "Skaista ezers", which is Latvian for "Beautiful Lake" is also located within the nature reserve.

In 2007 a trail of wooden planks was built in the southern area of the reserve. It leads from the end of the peat extraction area in a circle and has a total length of 5 kilometers. On the widest point away from the start, close to an old military road from WW1, a bird watching tower and picnic tables can be found. Along the way, several information boards explain about the resident flora and fauna as well as about the peat industry in Latvia and the world in Latvian and English language. According to those information boards, peat is still used as energy source in Latvia and accounts for around 1% of the total energy mix.

The reserve is home to several special of animals, including 10 protected bird species in Latvia. It is also a common resting place for several geese and cranes.
