= Ozolnieki =

Village in Latvia

- Village
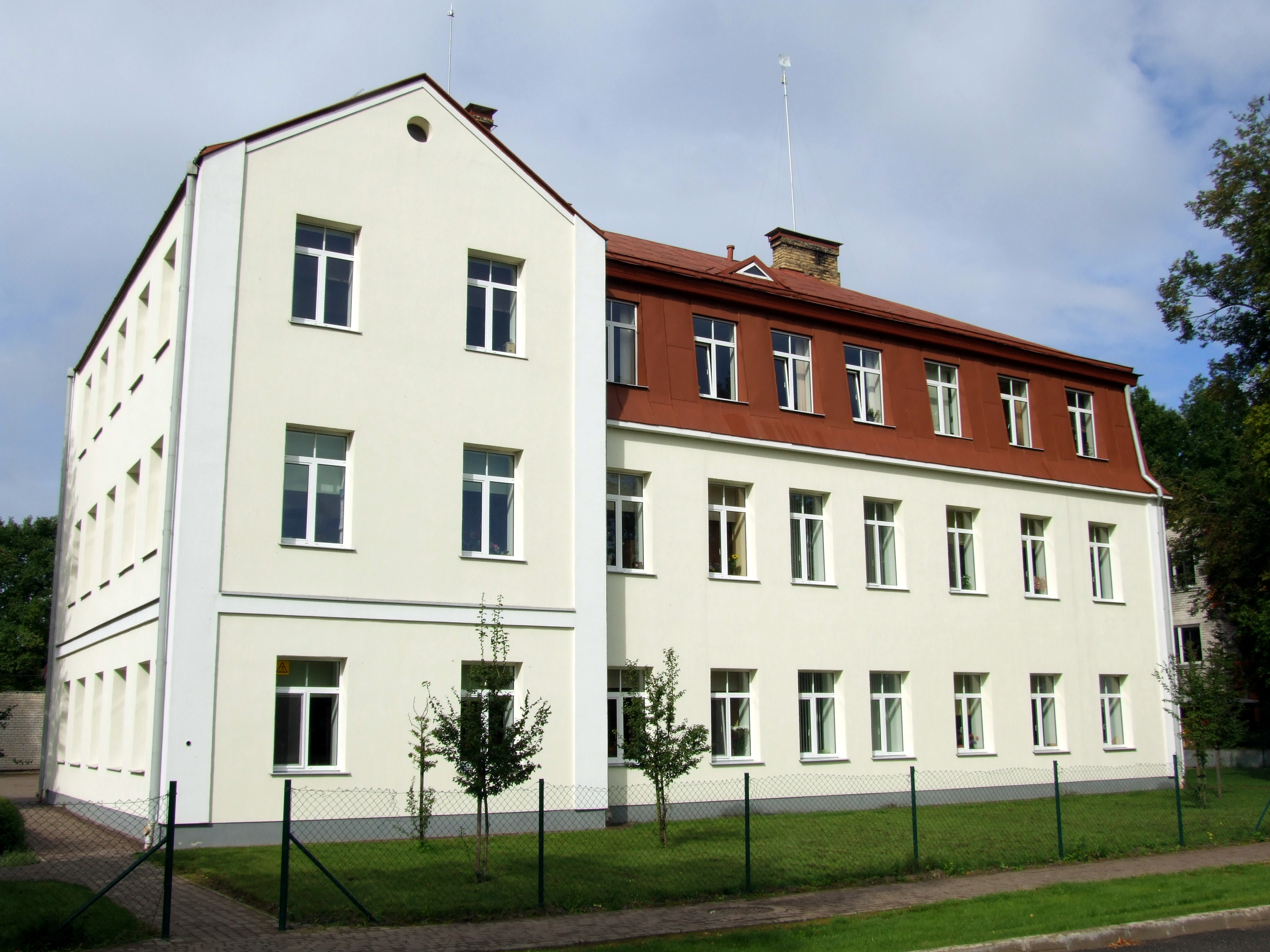
- School in Ozolnieki
- Interactive map of Ozolnieki
- Ozolnieki location inside Latvia
- Coordinates: 56°41′26.99″N 23°47′16.55″E
- Country: Latvia
- Municipality: Jelgava
- Parish: Ozolnieki
- Elevation: 3 m (9.8 ft)

Population (2005)
  - Total: 3,314
- Time zone: UTC+2 (EET)
  - Summer (DST): UTC+3 (EEST)
- Postal code: LV-3018
- Calling code: +371 63050xx
- Website: www.ozolnieki.lv

Ozolnieki is a village in Ozolnieki Parish, Jelgava Municipality in the Semigallia region of Latvia. The village is located at Iecava river approximately 36 km (22 mi) from the capital Riga and 6 km (4 mi) from the city of Jelgava.
