= Cena (river) =

River in Latvia

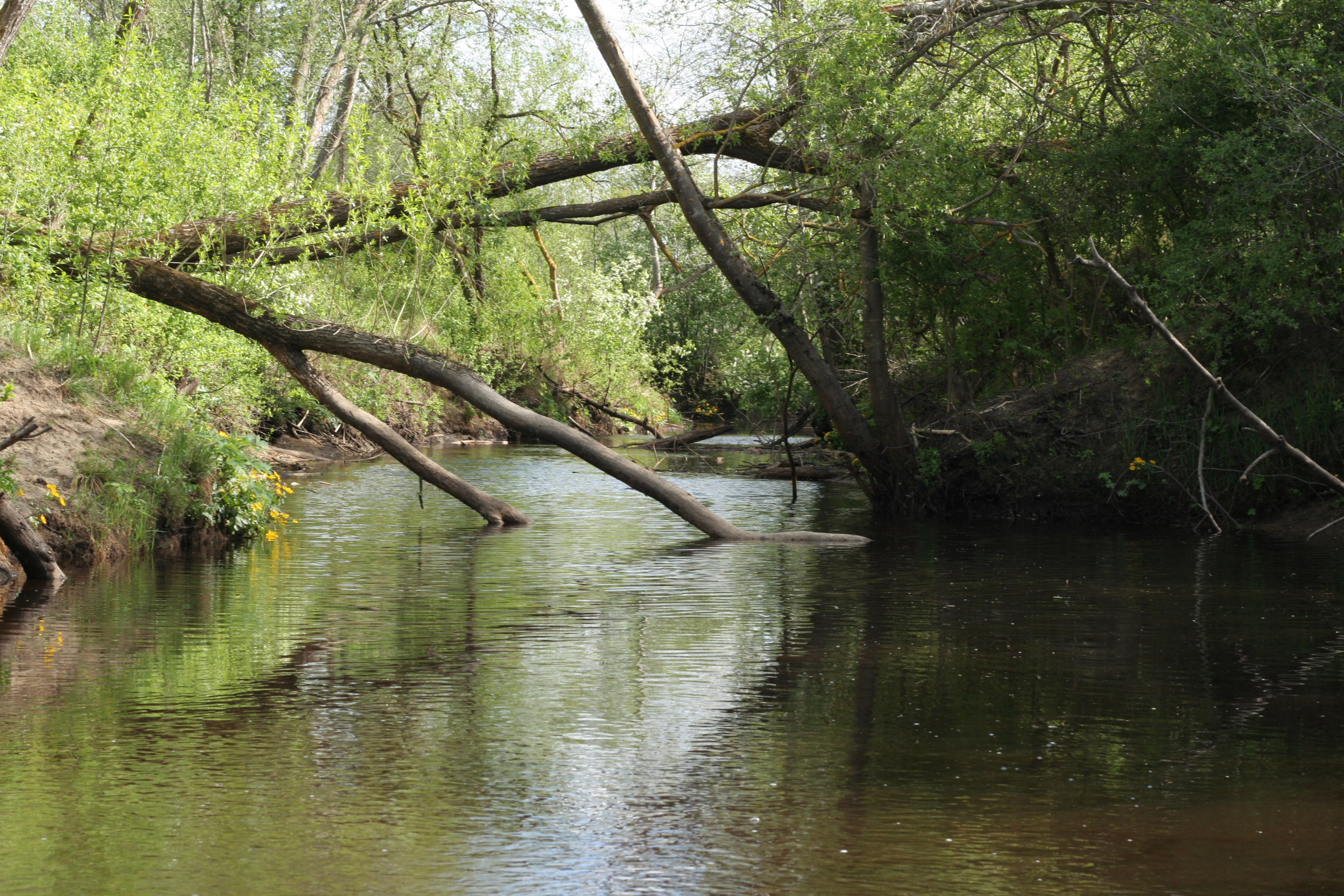
- The Cena near its confluence with Misa river

Location
- Country: Semigallia, Latvia

Physical characteristics
- Source: Cenas tīrelis swamp
  - location: Mārupe Municipality
- Mouth: Misa
  - location: Jelgava Municipality
  - coordinates: 56.7130°N 23.7999°E
  - elevation: 14.2 m (47 ft)
- Length: 18 km (11 mi)

Basin features
- Progression: Misa→ Iecava→ Lielupe→ Baltic Sea

The Cena is a small river in Semigallia, Latvia, and a right-hand tributary of the Misa. The river starts in Cenas tīrelis swamp, in Mārupe Municipality and ends at its confluence in the Misa river in Jelgava Municipality. The Cena has been channelized for almost its entire length.
