= Misa (river in Latvia) =

River in Latvia

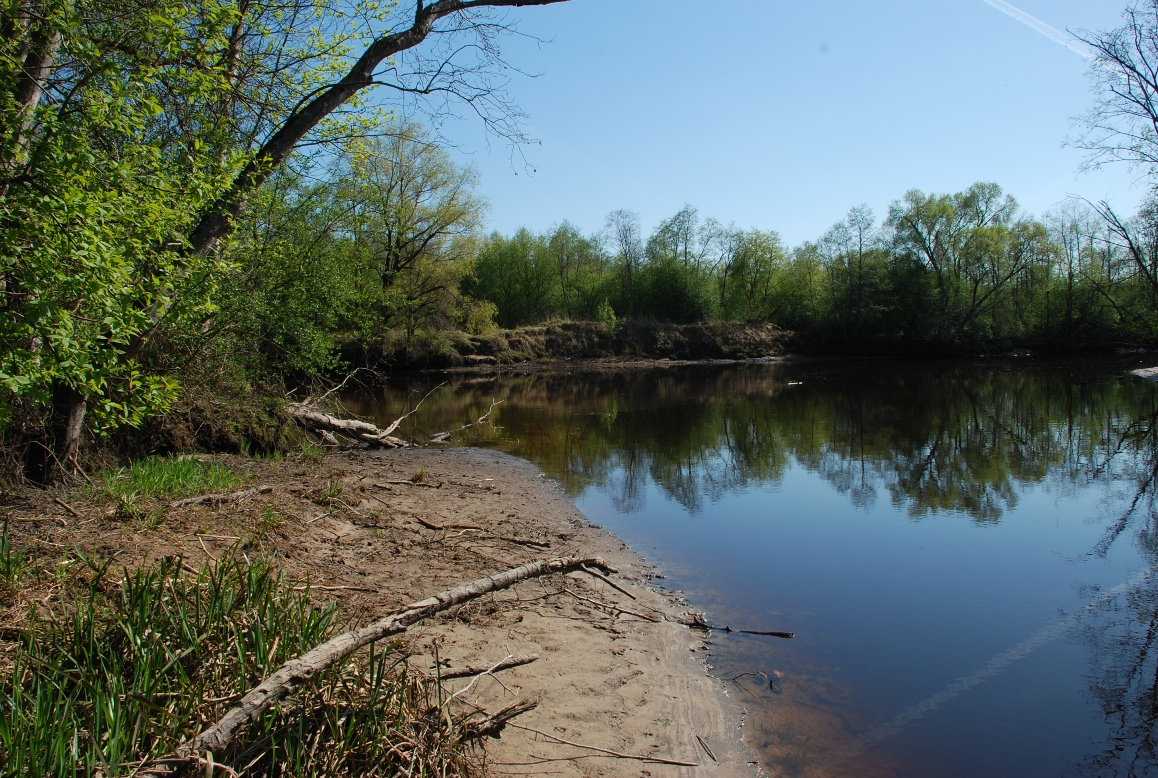
- Misa River (right) meets with Iecava river

Location
- Country: Latvia

Physical characteristics
- Source
  - location: Valle Parish, Bauska Municipality
  - elevation: 0.4 m (1 ft 4 in)
- Mouth: Iecava
  - location: Jelgava Municipality
  - coordinates: 56.7032°N 23.7822°E
- Length: 108 km (67 mi)

Basin features
- Progression: Iecava→ Lielupe→ Baltic Sea
- Tributaries
  - right: Cena

The Misa is a river, 108 kilometres long, in the Semigallia region of Latvia. Its upper course till its tributary Zvirgzde river is rectificated. There are active peat extraction sites and polders on the banks of the river from the village of Stelpe to Beibeži. From the Zvirgzde river to the village of Plakanciems there are several summer cottage colonies on the wooded banks of the Misa. Below Plakanciems to the Misa's confluence with the Iecava near Ozolnieki, the land either side of the river has a relatively high population density.

The biggest settlements near the river are: Stelpe, Beibeži, Dzērumi, Plakanciems, Pēternieki, Dalbe and Ozolnieki.

== Tributaries ==
Tributary	Bank	Distance (km)
Miļļupīte	Left	11
Skujupīte	Left	
Medaine	Left	
Vārnupe	Right	17
Taļķe	Right	34
Zvirgzde	Right	30
Vīksniņa	Right	14
Olaine	Right	13
Cena	Right	15
