= Ilhami Çene =

Turkish fencer

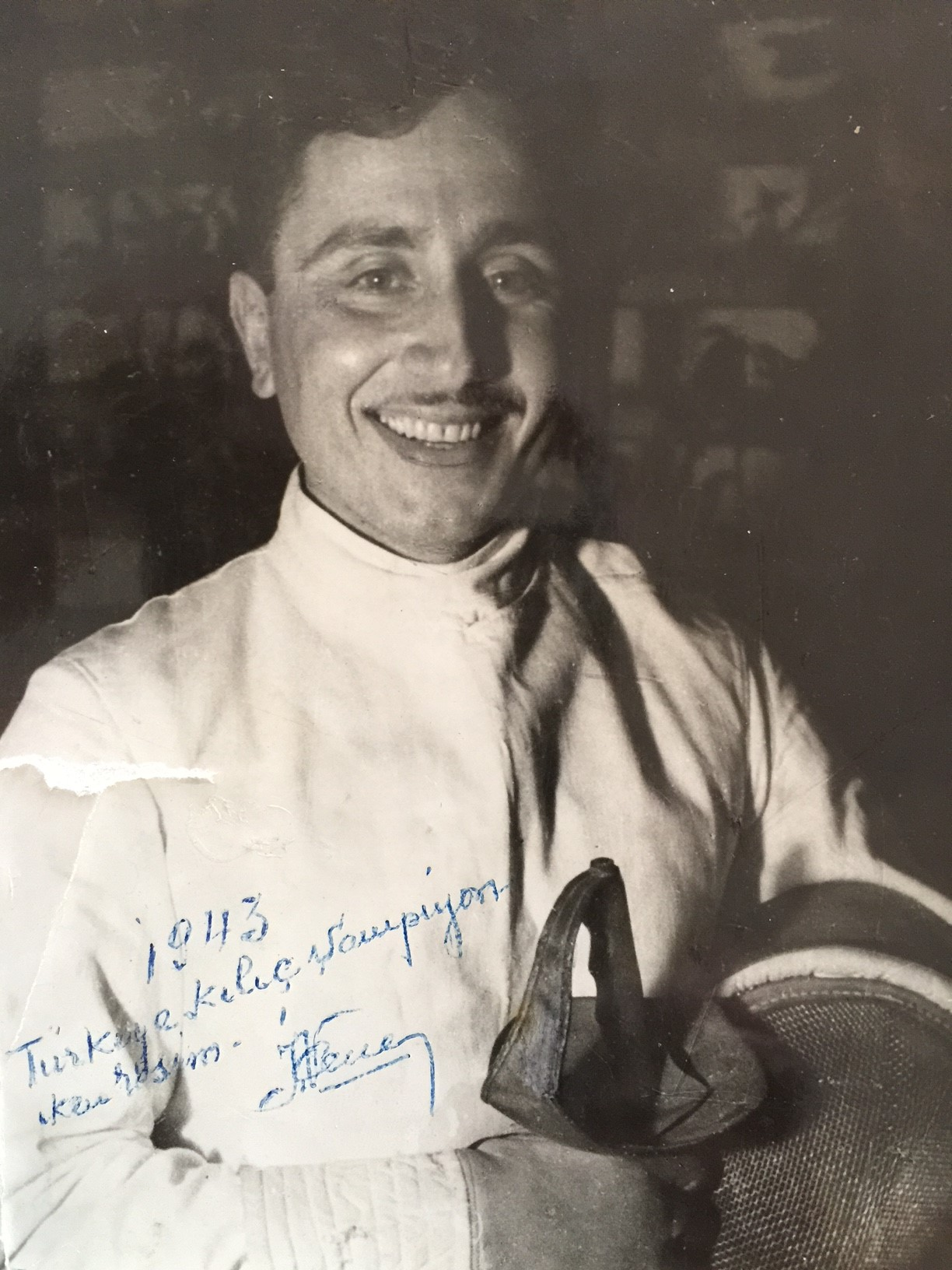
- Ilhami Çene

Personal information
- Born: 5 August 1909
- Died: 10 July 1977 (aged 67)

Sport
- Sport: Fencing

Ilhami Çene (5 August 1909 – 10 July 1977) was a Turkish fencer. He competed in the team sabre events at the 1936 Summer Olympics.
