= Tetele =

Village in Latvia

- Village
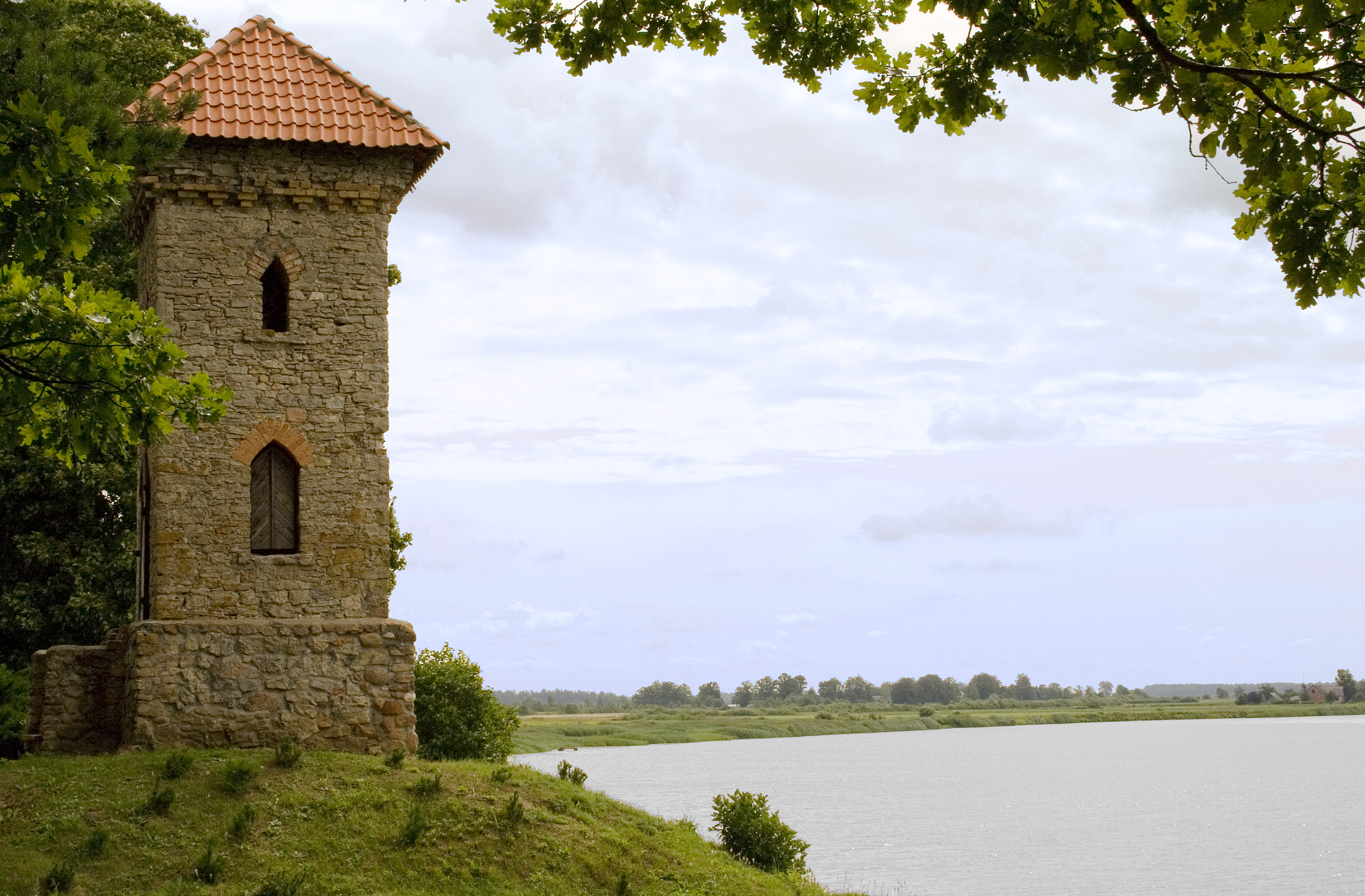
- Tetele tower

- Tetele's location inside Latvia
- Coordinates: 56°38′24.34″N 23°49′54.96″E
- Country: Latvia
- Municipality: Jelgava
- Parish: Cena

Population (2005)
  - Total: 370

Tetele is a village in Cena Parish, Jelgava Municipality in the Semigallia region of Latvia. The village is located on the Lielupe river approximately 39 km from the capital Riga and 8 km from the city of Jelgava.
