= Cena N641 =

Bomb detection dog in the US Marines

Cena N641 typically referred to simply as Cena was a black Labrador Retriever bomb detection dog in the US Marine Corps. He served three tours of duty in Afghanistan.

After retirement of the dog with a hip injury, Cena was four years later reunited with one of his Afghanistan handlers, Jeff DeYoung as a PTSD therapy dog, on 24 April 2014.

On 27 July 2017, Cena was euthanized by DeYoung as he was suffering from bone cancer. Hundreds of people in Muskegon, Michigan attended the send-off.

== See also ==
- List of individual dogs
