= Jacques Gousset =

French Protestant theologian and philologist

Jacques Gousset (Latinized as Gussetius; 1635–1704) was a French Protestant theologian and philologist, after 1685 in exile in the Netherlands.

== Life ==
He was born in Blois, the son of Pierre Gousset and Marguerite Papin; he was a cousin of Denis Papin. He was a student of Louis Cappel at Saumur Academy, and then became pastor at Poitiers.

He left France after the revocation of the Edict of Nantes in 1685, and became professor of the University of Groningen in 1692.

== Works ==
He wrote a work in 1687 against the apocalyptic predictions of Pierre Jurieu. Against Isaac of Troki's Chizzuk Emunah he wrote in 1688 (Controversiarum adversus Judaeos ternio), returning to the topic in 1712 (Jesu Christi evangeliique veritas salutifera, demonstrata in confutatione Libri Chizzouk Emounah, a R. Isaco scripti). Considérations théologiques et critiques sur le Projet d'une nouvelle version française de la Bible (1698) criticised the proposal of Charles Le Cène for a new Bible translation.

As a Hebraist Gousset was identified with the view that the Hebrew language was the language of divine revelation. He rejected the need for historical or comparative study of the language in order to read the Bible. Gousset published a Hebrew lexicon: Commentarii linguae ebraicae (1702), later editions as Lexicon linguae hebraicae.

He was also a defender of Cartesianism against occasionalism. He had known Louis de La Forge from early life, and had talked to him then on the underlying philosophical issues, and for this reason took him to be the founder of the occasionalist theory.
