= Ozolnieki Parish =

Administrative unit in Latvia

- parish of Latvia
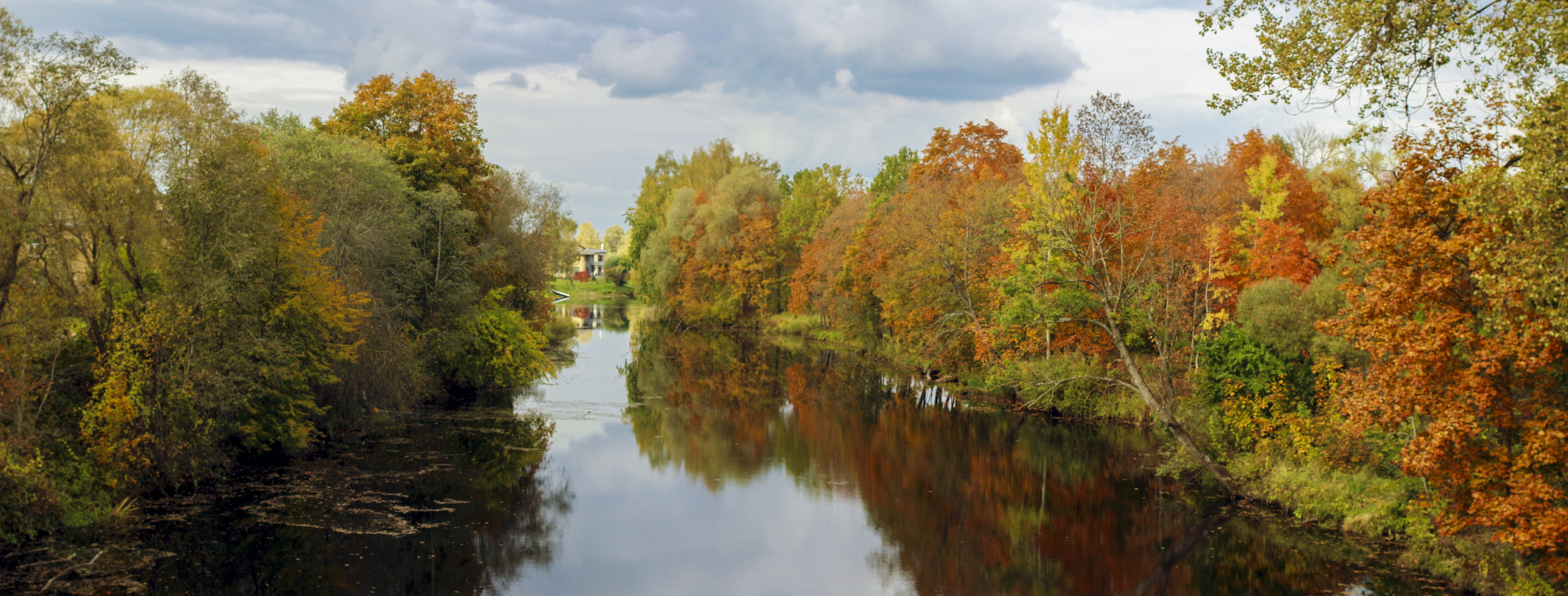

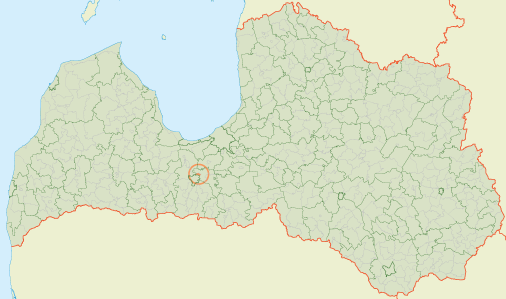
- Coordinates: 56°41′29″N 23°46′31″E
- Country: Latvia

Population (1 January 2026)
  - Total: 4,121

Ozolnieki Parish is an administrative unit of Jelgava Municipality in the Semigallia region of Latvia (From 2009 until 2021, it was part of the former Ozolnieki Municipality).
