= Charles Le Cène =

French Huguenot controversialist

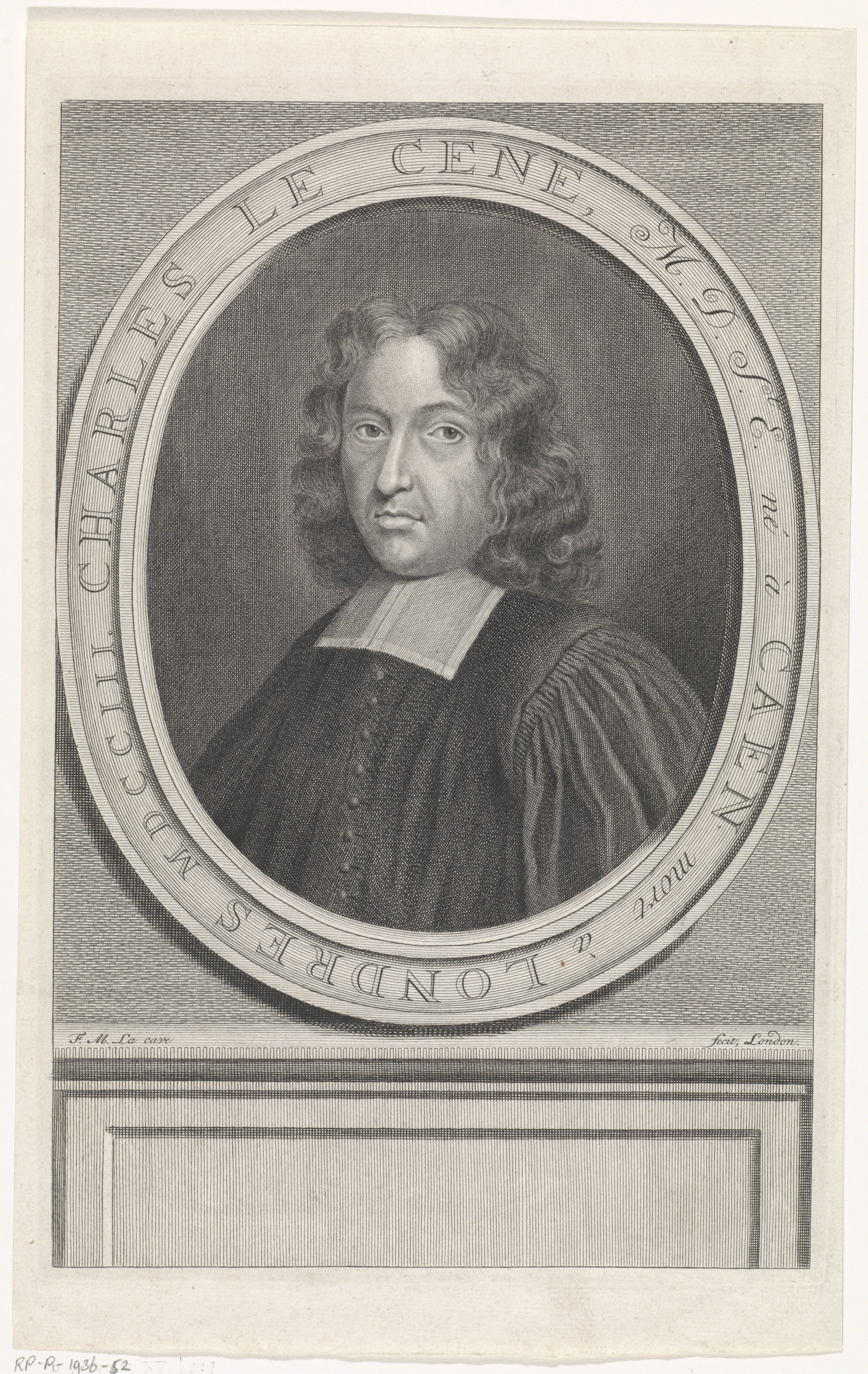
Charles Le Cène

Charles Le Cène (1647?–1703) was a French Huguenot controversialist, in exile in England and the Netherlands after 1685.

== Life ==
He was born around 1647 at Caen in Normandy, of well-to-do parents. He studied theology at Sedan from 1667 to 1669, and then at the University of Geneva (August 1669 to November 1670) and Saumur Academy (1670 to March 1672). In 1672 he received ordination as a Protestant minister at Caen, and received a call to the church of Honfleur. While there he married a lady with a fortune, bought a library, and began a new French translation of the Bible, at which he continued to work throughout his life.

Le Cène's ministry at Honfleur ceased by his own request on 2 September 1682, and in the following year he officiated temporarily at Charenton. His settlement at Charenton was opposed on account of his allegedly Socinian views (though Le Cène himself associated Socinians with “libertines” who “insult our doctors”, see his ‘Entretiens sur diverses matieres de théologie’), and he remained under some suspicion. He was not a Socinian himself, but more of a liberal Remonstrant, much like Jean Le Clerc. On the 1685 revocation of the edict of Nantes, he travelled to The Hague (22 December 1685).

On reaching London, he went to live with Pierre Allix and other friends and countrymen, who established a ‘conformist’ French congregation in Jewin Street, London, in 1686. But the Huguenots in England were soon involved in controversy on doctrinal questions, and Le Cène's eccentric views, similar to those of de Courcelles, rendered him unpopular in some camps. In 1686 or 1687 Jacques Gousset heard him preach in London in a seemingly heterodox and Arminian sense, and the congregation expressed reluctance to accept all of his teachings.

Before 1691 Le Cène withdrew to Holland; perhaps in 1699 he returned to England, and died in London in 1703. His son, Michel-Charles, who on 30 September 1699 was received as a member of the church at Amsterdam, followed him to London in December 1706, and remained in England till 1718.

== Works ==
Le Cène published:

- ‘De l'Etat de l'Homme apres le Pèché et de sa Predestination au Salut,’ Amsterdam, 1684. This work was announced in the Nouvelles de la République des Lettres for July 1684. It bore no author's name, and was at first attributed to Allix, who had forwarded the manuscript from Paris to the Amsterdam printer.
- ‘Entretiens sur diverses matières de Théologie, où l'on examine particulièrement les Questions de la Grace Immediate, du franc-arbitre, du Pèché Originel, de l'Incertitude de la Métaphysique, et de la Predestination,’ Amsterdam, 1685. Pierre Bayle identified the author of the first part with Le Cène, and of the second with Le Clerc (Nouvelles de la République des Lettres, April 1685).
- ‘Conversations sur diverses matières de Religion, où l'on fait voir la tolérance que les Chrétiens de différents sentimens doivent avoir les uns pour les autres et où l'on explique ce que l'Ecriture Sainte nous dit des alliances de Dieu, de la Justification et de le certitude du salut, avec un Traité de la Liberté de Conscience dedié au Roi de France et à son conseil,’ Philadelphia (Amsterdam), 1687. The first part is Le Cène's original work, and in it he shows a knowledge of English divinity, quoting the works of William Chillingworth and others. The second part is a translation of the Socinian Johannes Crellius's ‘Junii Bruti Poloni Vindiciæ pro Religionis Libertate’ (1637). In 1719 a fresh French translation of Crellius was printed anonymously in London. The author accused Le Cène of infidelity in his translation, and of printing the treatise without any acknowledgment of its derivation.
- ‘Projet d'une nouvelle version Françoise de la Bible,’ Rotterdam, 1696. This consists only of a first part. A second part was promised, and was first printed by Michel Le Cène in his edition of his father's Bible (1741). In 1702 an incomplete and poor English translation by H. R. (probably Hilary Renaud), of the first part only, was printed in London, and its division by the translator into two parts has caused some bibliographical confusion. In 1729 a second edition of this translation appeared in London, with these errors uncorrected. Le Cène's ‘Projet’ criticises previous versions of the Bible, more especially the Geneva version, lays down rules for translation, and applies them to disputed passages, often giving his own Socinian views. It was attacked by Gousset, in his ‘Considérations … sur le Projet,’ 1698.
- ‘La Sainte Bible, nouvelle version Françoise,’ 1741, 2 vols. published by Le Cène's son, Michel Charles. On its appearance this work was denounced by the church of Utrecht, referred to the synod of the Walloon churches on 6 September 1742, and condemned as heretical.
