= Cena Parish =

Administrative unit in Latvia

- parish of Latvia
- Coat of arms

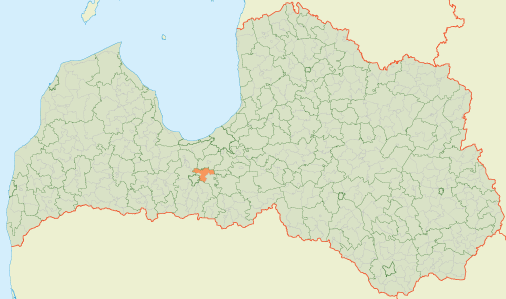
- Coordinates: 56°42′00″N 23°51′17″E
- Country: Latvia

Population (1 January 2026)
  - Total: 4,436

Cena Parish is an administrative unit of Jelgava Municipality in the Semigallia region of Latvia. From 2009 until 2021, it was part of the former Ozolnieki Municipality.
