= Dorupe Station =

Railway station in Latvia

General information
- Location: Glūda Parish, Jelgava Municipality; Latvia
- Coordinates: 56°36′22.04″N 23°31′50.33″E
- Tracks: 2

History
- Opened: 1934
- Closed: Unused since 2010.
Location
- Location within Latvia

Dorupe Station was a railway station on the Jelgava – Liepāja Railway in Latvia. The station closed in 2010.
