= Mārtiņš Zīverts =

Latvian playwright

Mārtiņš Zīverts (27 July 1903 in Mežmuiža, Vilce parish – 4 October 1990 in Stockholm, sweden) was a Latvian playwright.

== Biography ==
Zīverts was born in Mežmuiža, Courland Governorate (now Vilce parish, Jelgava municipality, Latvia). He studied philosophy at the University of Latvia in Riga, later working as an editor and dramaturgist at the National Theater in Riga. He came to Sweden as a refugee in 1944. While he often worked as a laborer, he continued to write and direct plays, and served as chairman of the Latvian PEN center. He wrote more than 50 plays in several genres.

== Work ==
- Hasana harēms, 1927
- Nafta, 1931
- Kropļi, 1933
- Zelta zeme, 1933
- Galvu aukšā, 1935
- Āksts, 1936
- kolka, 1937
- Galvu augšā!, 1937
- Tīreļpurvs, 1937
- Partizāni, 1938
- Trakais juris, 1939
- Cilvēks grib dzīvot, 1939
- Ķīnas vāze, 1940
- Minhauzena precības, 1941
- Nauda, 1943
- Pāveste, 1944
- Vara, 1944
- Karātavu komēdija, 1946
- Divkauja, 1946
- Kāds, kura nav, 1947
- Zaļā krūze, 1949
- Rūda, 1954
- Čūska, 1960.
- Meli meklē meli, 1962
- Pēdējā laiva, 1967
- Kaļostro Vilcē, 1967
- Nauda, 1967
- Rīga dimd, 1968
- Totēms, 1972
- Kopenhāgenas dialogs, 1980
- Teātris,1988
- Par sevi: autobiogrāfija, intervijas, vēstules, 1992

== Adaptations ==
In 1992 a Lithuanian director Juozas Sabolius has made a two-part costume drama based on Zīverts' play "Vara" (Power) about the life of Lithuania's king Mindaugas which was aired by Lithuania's national broadcaster.
