= Bramberģe Manor =

Manor house in Latvia

- Semigallia, Latvia
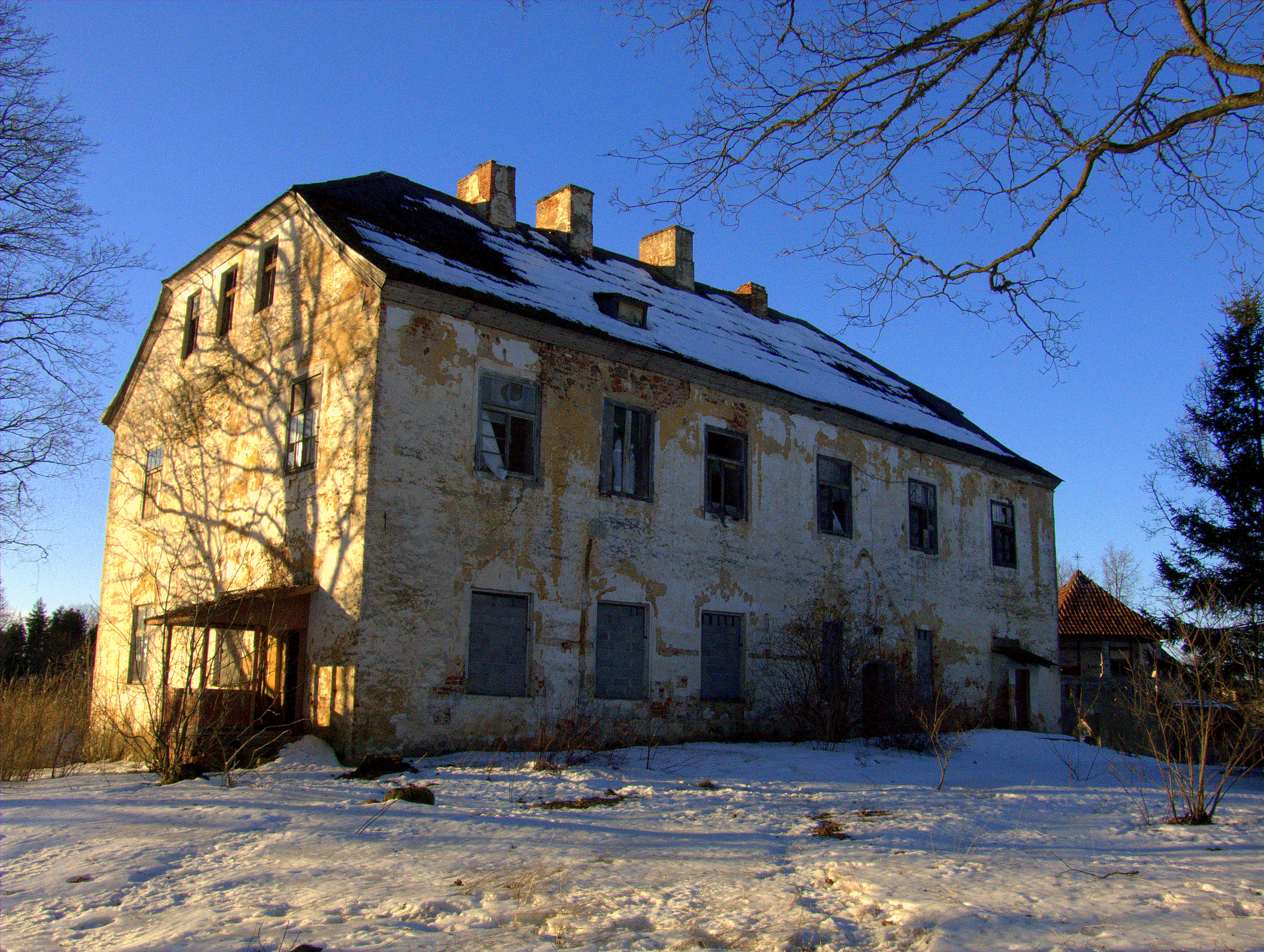

Site information
- Type: Manor

Location
- Coordinates: 56°34′46.2″N 23°35′08.6″E

Bramberģe Manor (Latvian: Bramberģes muiža, German: Brandenburg) is a manor in Bramberģe, in the Glūda Parish of Jelgava Municipality in the Semigallia region of Latvia.

== History ==
The manor complex with the park was formed in the end of 16th century. In 1645 Duke Jacob Kettler gave manor to his wife Louis Charlotte, and thus manor remained the property of the crown until the beginning of the 20th century. Louis Charlotte was from Brandenburg and that's how manor got it German name. Initially it was owned by the Duchy, but after its dissolution it becomes the estate of the Russian crown. The present manor house was built later, around 1743. Even so manor house is the oldest stone buildings in Jelgava district in the recent centuries it has been rebuilt and destroyed several times. Some manor buildings erected in 16th century are still in a satisfactory condition. At the end of the 19th century manor gates has been built. In 20th century, in the 1980s the manor complex was renovated. The manor remained property of the Crown even after the Duchy of Courland was annexed by Russian Empire, it become the estate of the Russian crown. The manor formerly used by the municipality and the local collective farm is now privately owned.

== See also ==
- List of palaces and manor houses in Latvia
