= Vilce Parish =

Parish of Latvia

- parish of Latvia
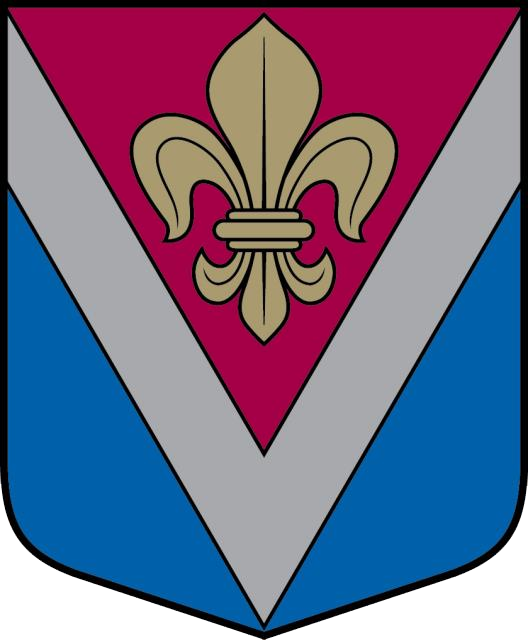
- Coat of arms

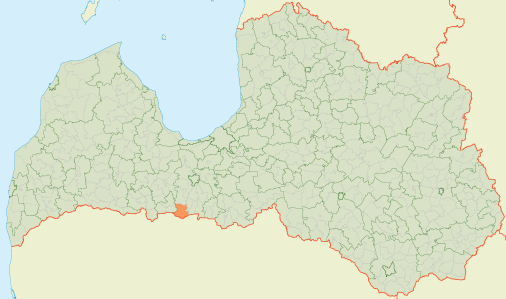
- 56°25′19″N 23°32′45″E
- Country: Latvia

Area
  - Total: 127.02 km^{2} (49.04 sq mi)
  - Land: 124.67 km^{2} (48.14 sq mi)
  - Water: 2.35 km^{2} (0.91 sq mi)

Population (1 January 2024)
  - Total: 1,399
  - Density: 11/km^{2} (29/sq mi)

Vilce parish (Latvian: Vilces pagasts, German: Wilzen) is an administrative unit of Jelgava Municipality in the Semigallia region of Latvia. Center - Vilce.

== Geography ==
Vilce parish is bordering in the west with Tērvete Parish, Dobele municipality, in the north - Zaļenieki Parish, Jelgava municipality, in the east - Lielplatone Parish, Eleja Parish, in the south - with the territory of Lithuania Joniškis District Municipality. Rivers: Ķīve, Platone, Rukūze, Sidrabe, Švėtė, Vilce.

== Towns, villages and settlements of Vilce parish ==
- Vilce (parish center)
- Ziedkalne
- Mūrmuiža
- Bandenieki
- Blankenfelde
- Kalnrozes
- Kapteines
- Mazvilce

== History ==
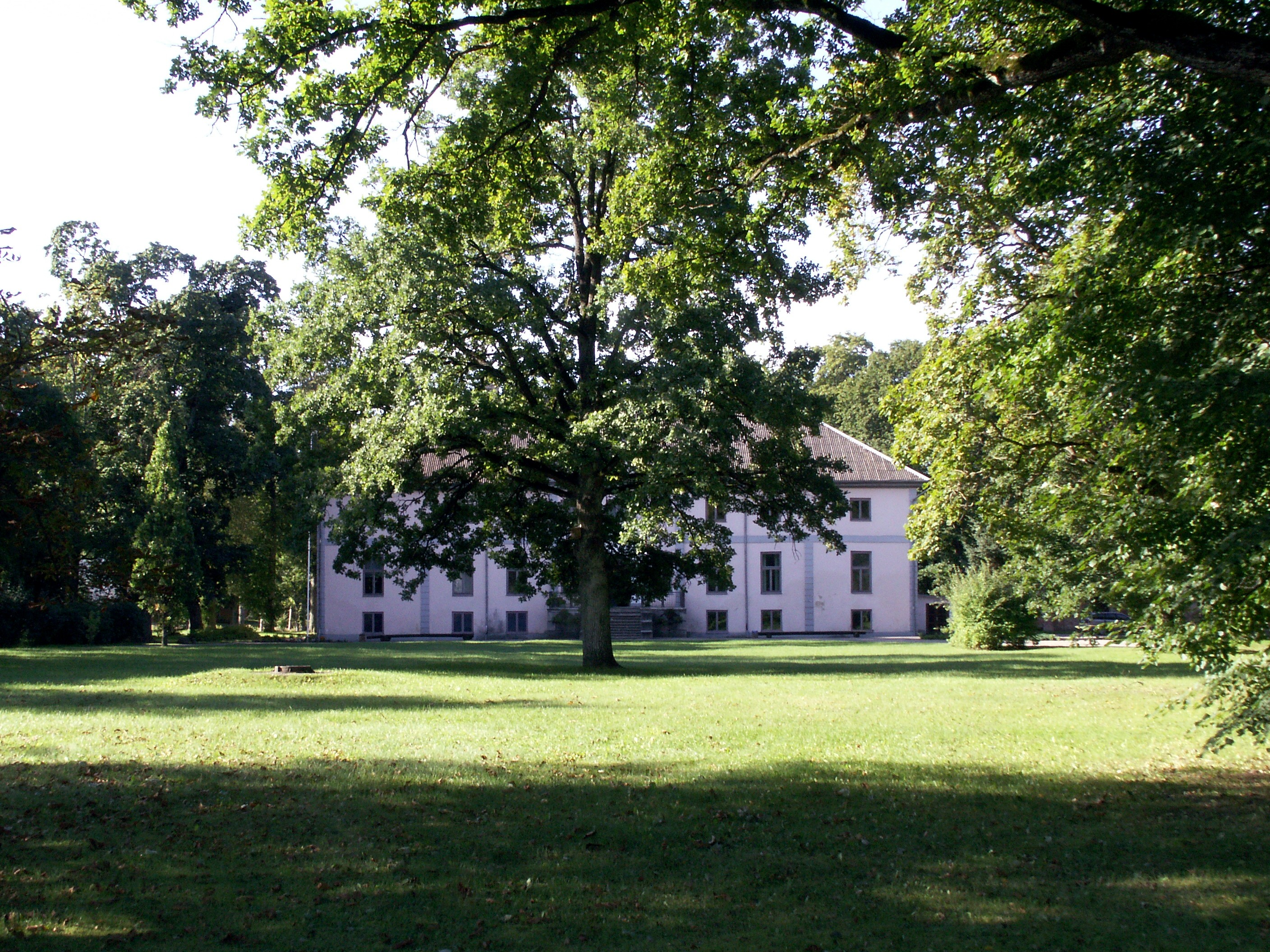
Vilce manor

In 1590 Vilce first mentioned. Vilce manor house was built in the 18th century. 1680 a watermill built on the river Vilce. In course of Great Northern War in Battle of Gemauerthof on July 16, 1705 Swedish Army under Adam Ludwig Lewenhaupt command defeated Imperial Russian Army led by the Count Boris Sheremetyev near the Murmühle (German: Gemauerthof) on Svete river. In 1935 monument was erected at the battle site, in 1991 cemetery restored of the Swedish soldiers who died in battle. Mūrmuiža stone bridge was built by the Swedes during the war around 1700. It is one of the oldest stone bridges in Latvia. It consists of 3 bridgehead vaulted bridges built of torn stones over the Vilce River and two drains. The total length of the bridge is 114 m. The main vault is 4 m high and at 6.8 m wide, it has sustained tank ride during the World War II. The bridge leads to Mūrmuiža, where at that time was the mill and the pub, built in the second half of the 17th century. The Swedish army stayed there during the Northern War. About 50 m from the bridge is the Vella depth (Devil's depth). Local legend tell tales about box with gold and a royal crown at the bottom of it.

In 1819 a school opened at Vilce Manor. By 1823 it was completed by 140 children but the school was closed. 1837 the school for the children of Wilts and Blankenfelde reopened, 1868 a new building was built for her on Elea Road. 1921 school became a four-year school, 1931 - in the decade, 1934 - at six, 1989 on the ninth, from 1992 Vilce Elementary School.

- 1820 – 1945 – Vilce County
- 1959 – 1990 – Vilce district, Jelgava district
- 1990 – 2009 – Vilce County
- as of 2009 – Vilce county, Jelgava municipality

== Monuments ==
A significant part of Vilce parish is occupied by Vilce Nature Park.

- Nature Monuments: Blankenfelde ash, Blankenfelde vinca, Gypsy Oak, Valley Oak.
- Architectural landmarks: Berkene Manor, Blankenfelde Manor and Park, Vilce Manor, Berkene Mill, Mūrmuiža Mill.
- Historical monuments: Silene mound, Vilce mound, Murmuiža ancient burial ground, Battle of Gemauerthof site, monument to Swedish soldiers near Mūrmuiža.
