= Klāra Kalniņa =

Latvian feminist (1874–1964)

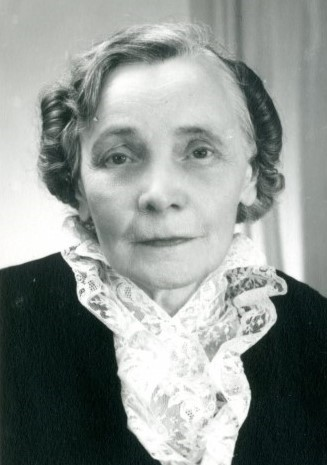
- Kalniņa in 1949
- Born: 24 February 1874; Vanci, Russian Empire (now Latvia)
- Died: 1964 (aged 89–90); Sweden
- Occupations: Politician, feminist, suffragette, and editor
- Spouse: Pauls Kalniņš
- Children: Brūno Kalniņš

Klāra Anna Luīze Kalniņa, née Veilande (1874–1964), was a Latvian feminist, suffragette, editor, and politician, a long-time member of the Latvian Social Democratic Workers' Party (Latvian: Latvijas Sociāldemokrātiskā Strādnieku Partija (LSDSP)).

== Life ==
Kalniņa was born in the village of Vanči in Courland Governorate, Russian Empire (today in Latvia) on 24 February 1874. She finished four grades of schooling in 1890 in Jelgava, where the language of instruction was German, not Latvian. She was admitted into the sixth grade of the Jelgava Gymnasium at the age of 20 and graduated in 1897 having completed the seventh grade. In the meantime, she had gone to St Petersburg, the capital of the Russian Empire, in an attempt to further her education, but was forced to return home in 1896 by financial difficulties. Kalniņa met her future husband, Pauls Kalniņš, in 1895 and they married three years later. They had one son, the politician Brūno Kalniņš. During the German occupation of Latvia during World War II, she and her husband participated in the pro-independence Latvian Central Council. After her husband's death in 1945, she fled to Sweden and lived there until she died in 1964.

== Activities ==
While still a student, Kalniņa was one of the founders of a literary group, Aurora (Latvian: Austra), that rejected the bourgeois idea that women's roles in life were limited to Kinder, Küche, Kirche. In the mid-1890s, she became involved in the New Current (Latvian: Jaunā strāva) and the beginnings of the social democratic movements. While in St Petersburg, she participated in the activities of the Social Democrats there and then became active in organizing the social democratic group in Kurzeme from 1901 to 1903. Kalniņa and her husband left Russia that same year and lived in Germany and Switzerland until the outbreak of the 1905 Russian Revolution prompted their temporary return.

She was elected to the Constitutional Assembly of Latvia in 1920. Alongside Aspazija, Apolonija Laurinoviča, Valērija Seile and Berta Vesmane, she was one of five women elected to the proto-parliament.

== Citations and references ==
=== Cited sources ===
- Novikova, Irina (2005). "Kalniņa, Klāra". In Haan, Francisca de; Daskalova, Krassimira; Loutfi, Anna (eds.). Biographical Dictionary of Women's Movements and Feminisms in Central, Eastern, and South Eastern Europe: 19th and 20th Centuries. New York: Central European University Press. ISBN 978-963-7326-39-4.
