= Bramberģe =

Village in Latvia

- former village
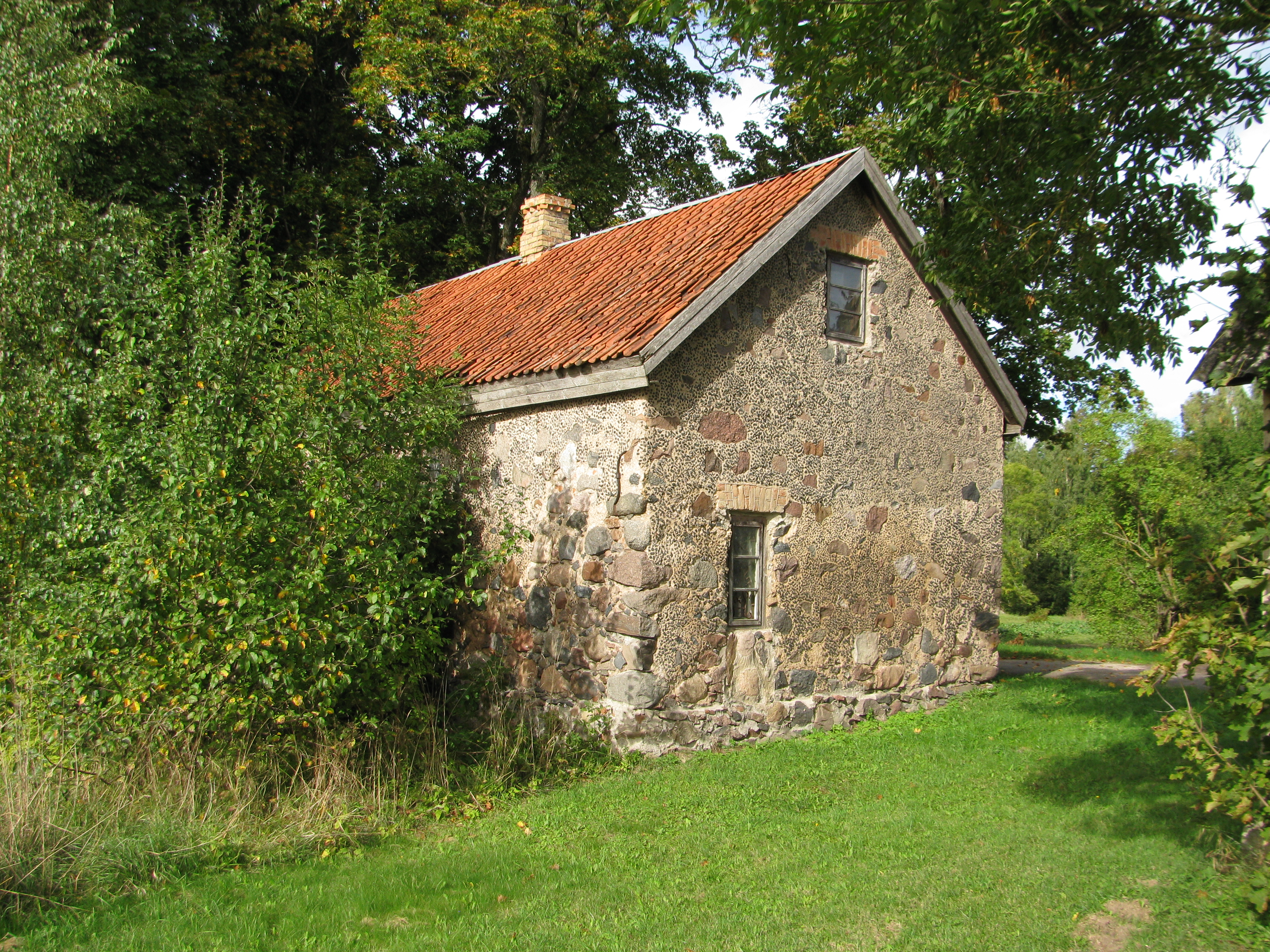
- Bramberģes manor house

- Location within Latvia
- Country: Latvia
- Municipality: Jelgava Municipality
- Parish: Glūda parish

Population
  - Total: 109

Bramberģe was a village in the Glūda Parish of Jelgava Municipality in the Semigallia region of Latvia next to country highway V1059. The village was founded in the 17th century next to the Bramberģe estate.

After territorial reform in 2011, Bramberģe lost its village status.

== See also ==
- Bramberģe Manor
