= Berta Pīpiņa =

Latvian politician, writer and journalist

- 1929
- Born: 28 September 1883; Code parish, Russian Empire
- Died: 1942 (aged 58–59); Siberia, USSR
- Other names: Berta Ziemele, Berta Pipinya
- Occupation: politician
- Years active: 1901–1940
- Known for: first woman parliamentarian of Latvia

Berta Pīpiņa (née Berta Ziemele; 28 September 1883 – 1942) was a Latvian teacher, journalist, politician and women's rights activist. She was the first woman elected to serve in the Saeima although there was six female members Constitutional Assembly of Latvia from May 1, 1920, until November 7, 1922, when the 1st Saeima convened. Active in women's rights, during her time in the Riga City Council and the Saeima, she strove to enact laws and policies to promote women's equality and protect families. When Soviet troops occupied Latvia, she was deported to Siberia, her life was removed from encyclopedias, and she died in a gulag.

== Early life ==
Berta Ziemele was born on 28 September 1883 in the Code parish of the Russian Empire, in what is now the Baltic state of Latvia, to Liza (née Kula) and Jekabs Ziemelis. Her parents worked a farm and ran an inn. Ziemele attended the Girls' Grammar School, a state operated primary facility in Misa parish, before attending the Beķeris Girls’ Preliminary Gymnasium in Bauska, which offered women four years of secondary schooling.

== Career ==
In 1901, Ziemele began teaching in Kharkiv, now in Ukraine. Between 1904 and 1908, she studied in Berlin under Dr. Liebman to learn speech therapy techniques to assist disabled children. The following year, she traveled to Switzerland and Russia to expand her knowledge of educational systems. Returning to Latvia in 1910, Ziemele married Ermanis Pīpiņš, (1873–1927), who was a book reviewer, journalist and literary critic. The couple subsequently had three children: daughters, Biruta and Nora and son, Jānis.

When Latvia gained its independence in 1918, Pīpiņa began active participation in social and political issues. She was one of the founders of the Democratic Center Party and was elected to serve on its Central Committee, the first woman elected to serve on a party's central governing body. In 1919, she was elected to the Riga City Council and began working on issues like public drinking and concerns focused around women and children. She was appointed to the Supply Commission and spoke at numerous events about women's issues. Around 1922, she joined the Latvian Women’s National League and that same year, the League joined the International Council of Women (ICW). In 1925, Pīpiņa became president of the League, which organized charitable work, such as founding a kindergarten, operating a library, establishing Sunday schools, and hosting educational and needlework courses for women. The organization also provided free legal advice to women, which Pīpiņa believed was part of the organizational goal of uniting women, educating them to bring up succeeding generations and helping them develop a national spirit.

Between 1925 and 1928, Pīpiņa headed the Riga Department for the Destitute and then until 1931 served on the Riga Audit Commission, which monitored the municipal offices. She began publishing in 1928, with a piece, Kā es runāju ar saviem bērniem par dzimumdzīvi (How to talk to my children about sexuality), which was intended to help women educate their children. In 1930, she was involved in founding the Council of Latvian Women’s Organizations, an umbrella organization to advance the social and political equality of women. She served on its board and was appointed as the organization's leader. In 1931, Pīpiņa became the first woman to serve in the Saeima and was the only female parliamentarian of the 100-member body during the interwar period. She was elected as a deputy representing the Democratic Center and served as an assistant to the Chair for the Commission on Self Government and as secretary of the Petitions Commission. Pīpiņa strove to seek legal protections for women and families. When a law was proposed to force married women to relinquish their employment, Pīpiņa created a stir in stating her opposition, drawing the scorn of Kārlis Ulmanis. She also worked on laws to provide state support for families and the poor, and was often ridiculed by her male colleagues and the press for her positions.

During the same time, Pīpiņa participated in international women's conferences, attending "ICW Congresses in Vienna (1930), Stockholm (1933), Paris (1934), and Dubrovnik (1936)", and women's meetings held in Austria, Hungary and Russia, among others. In 1934, she co-founded a monthly periodical, Latviete (Latvian woman). The purpose of the journal was to educate women on issues concerning the nation and fight the "patriarchal stereotypes" that prohibited women from being treated as equals in society. That same year, Pīpiņa terminated her work with the Riga City Council and in 1935, she stepped down from her leadership of the umbrella council. She published a novel, Lejaskrodzinieka meita (Innkeeper's daughter, 1935) and in 1936, she became a vice president of ICW.

When the authoritarian regime came into power in 1934, Pīpiņa remained active as a journalist but withdrew from politics. In 1940, when the Soviet troops occupied Latvia, she became a target and was deported to Siberia in 1941.

== Death and legacy ==
Pīpiņa died in a labor camp on the Ob River in 1942. During the Soviet period, she was considered as an enemy of the state, having served in the independent parliament of Latvia and her biography was purged from encyclopedias. Her importance in the political history and in the women’s movement re-emerged after Latvia regained its independence.

On September 28, 2026, a plaque honoring Pīpiņa and her husband was unveiled on a building constructed by her husband, at 69 Gertrudes Street, in Riga, Latvia.
