= Blankenfelde Manor =

Manor house in Latvia

- Blankenfeldes muiža
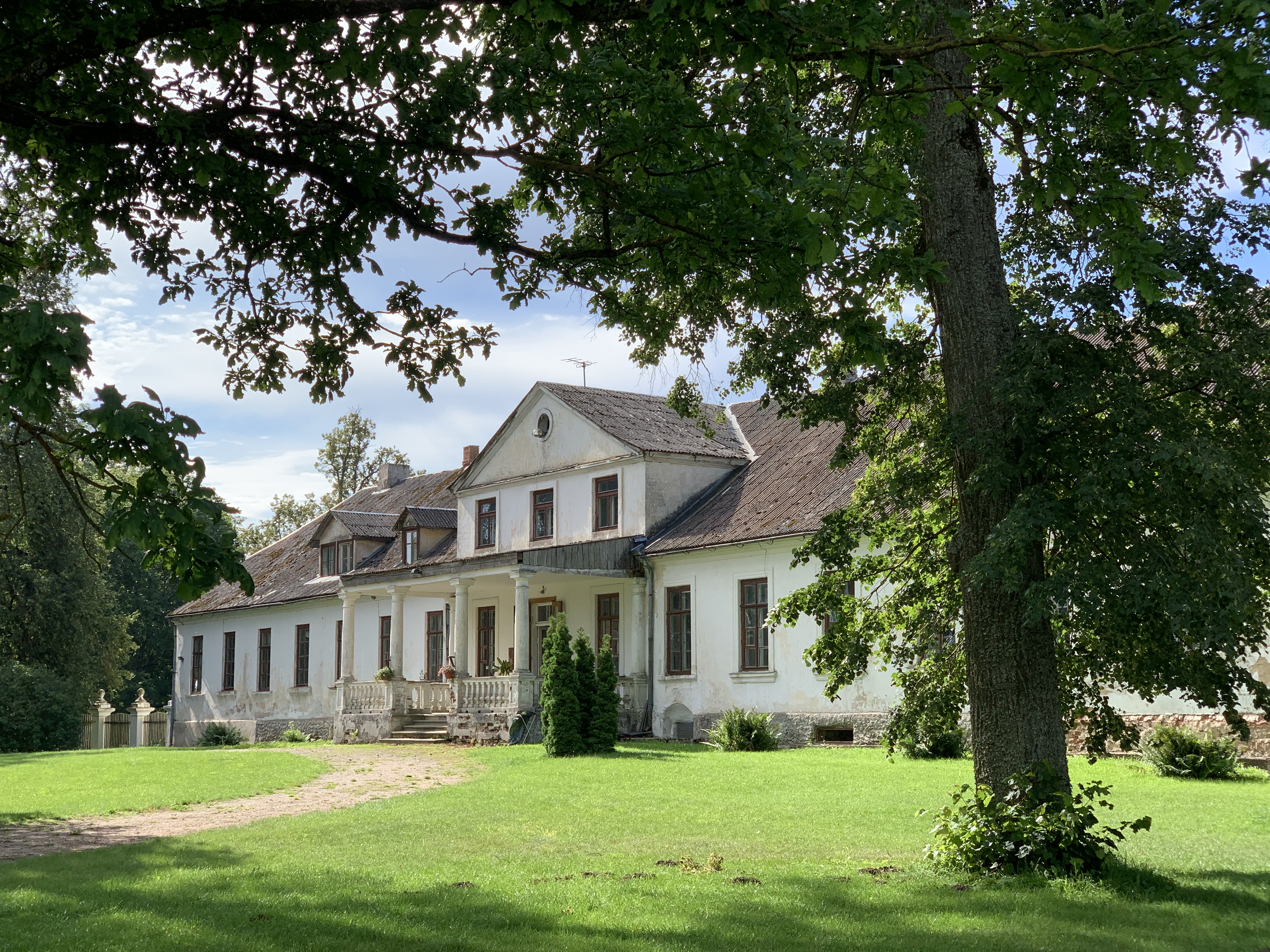
- Manor house in 2020

- Location within Latvia
- Former names: Blankenfeld

General information
- Architectural style: Baroque
- Location: Blankenfelde, Vilce Parish, Jelgava Municipality, Latvia
- Coordinates: 56°20′40″N 23°32′50″E
- Completed: 1743
- Renovated: Ongoing since 2007.
- Client: von Königfels family
- Owner: Private property

Blankenfelde Manor (Latvian: Blankenfeldes muiža) is a manor in Vilce Parish, Jelgava Municipality in the historical region of Semigallia, in Latvia. Built at the last quarter of the 17th century, it changed owners several times. The renovation work is currently being processed.

== History ==
The first reports of the manor date from 1689 when the owner was Ernst von Medem. The estate changed owners several times and was part of the von Hahn family from 1840 until 1920. Between 1804 and 1805 the manor was bestowed by the Russian imperial house to Andreas von Königfels, during this time the manor was visited by exiled French King Louis XVIII.

== Description ==
The complex structure of the manor dates from the mid 18th century and the main building erected in 1743 has a 19th-century English-style park with exotic fir trees and multiple small ponds, nowadays also with play and sports grounds. The manor complex features also a restored gatehouse and a stable. The manor is distinguished from other Latvian manors by the small architectural forms, such as the entrance gates, tea pavilions, grotto, the only rococo wrought iron garden gate in Latvia.

Nowadays the manor houses a hotel, a small juice plant (using berries grown in manor's garden) and a bell museum. The renovation work of the main building is now underway. Blankenfelde estate flower garden is part of the spring tulbifestivale.

The manor and the stay of the future Louis XVIII are the topic of La Nuit de Blankenfeld (The night of Blankenfeld), a novel by French author David Gaillardon. The novel deals with the damnation of the king's companion, the marquess of Mailly-Nesles at Blankenfeld, during the night of Christmas 1804.

== Manor complex ==
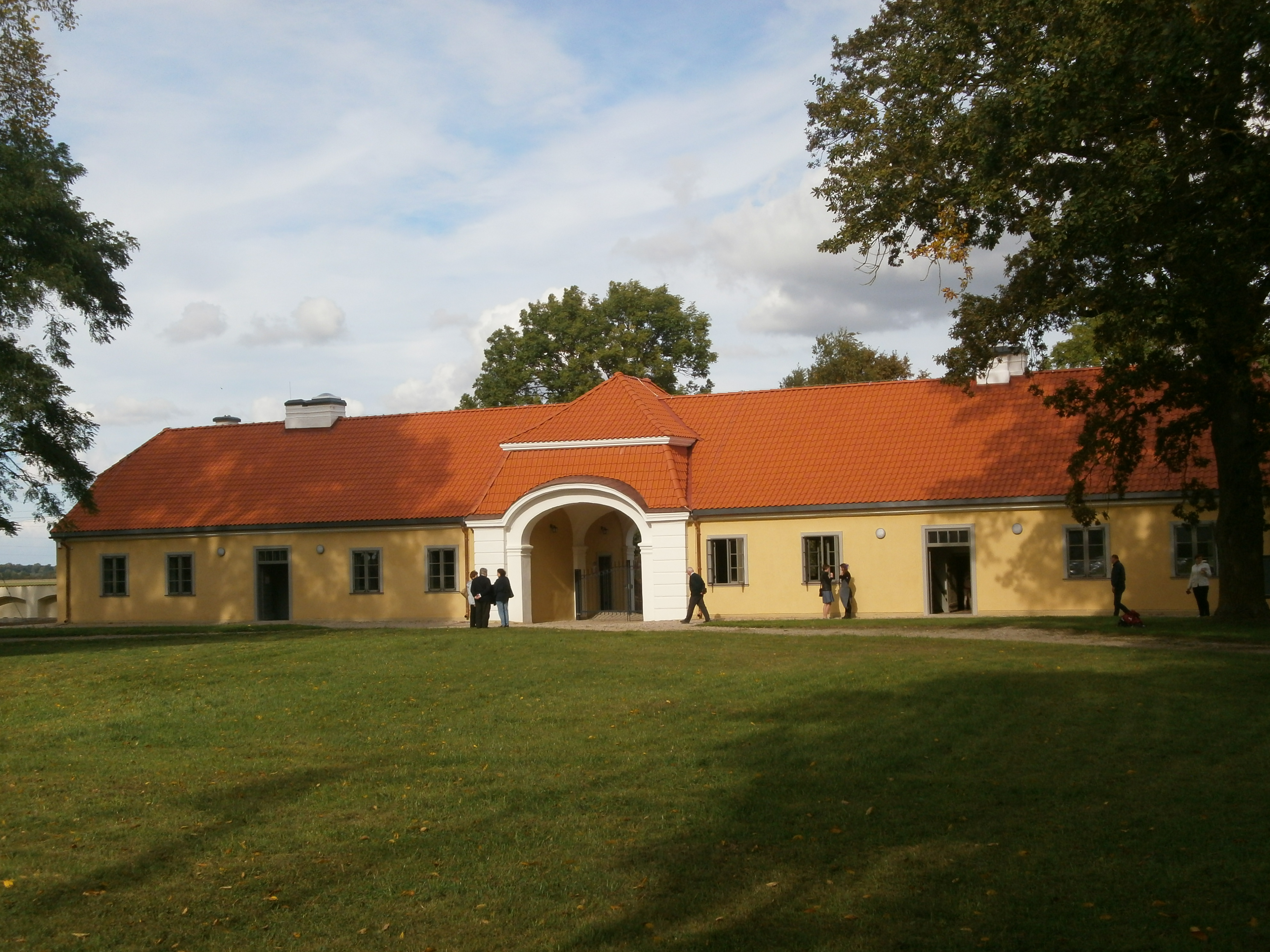
House of the servants

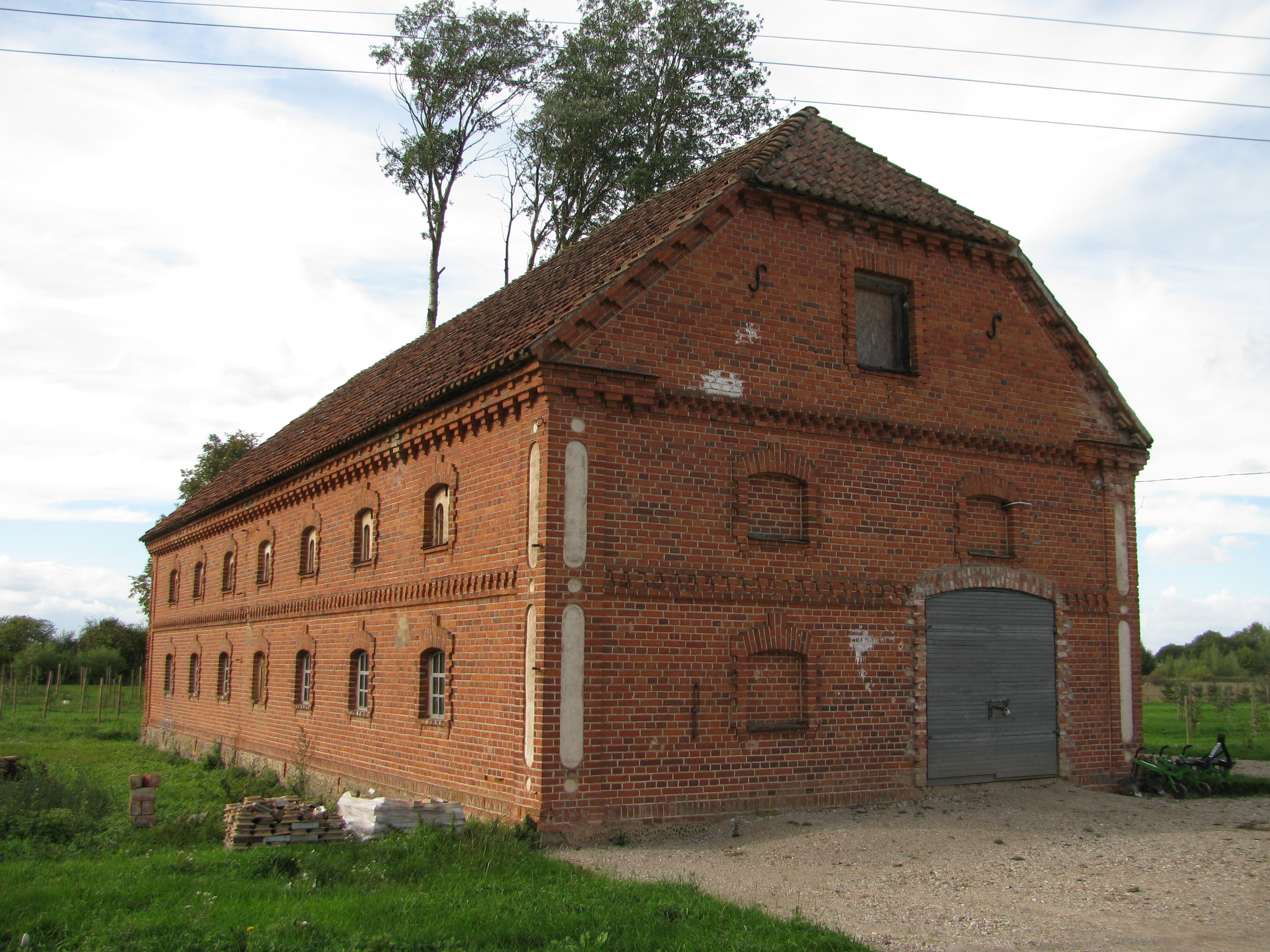
Barn

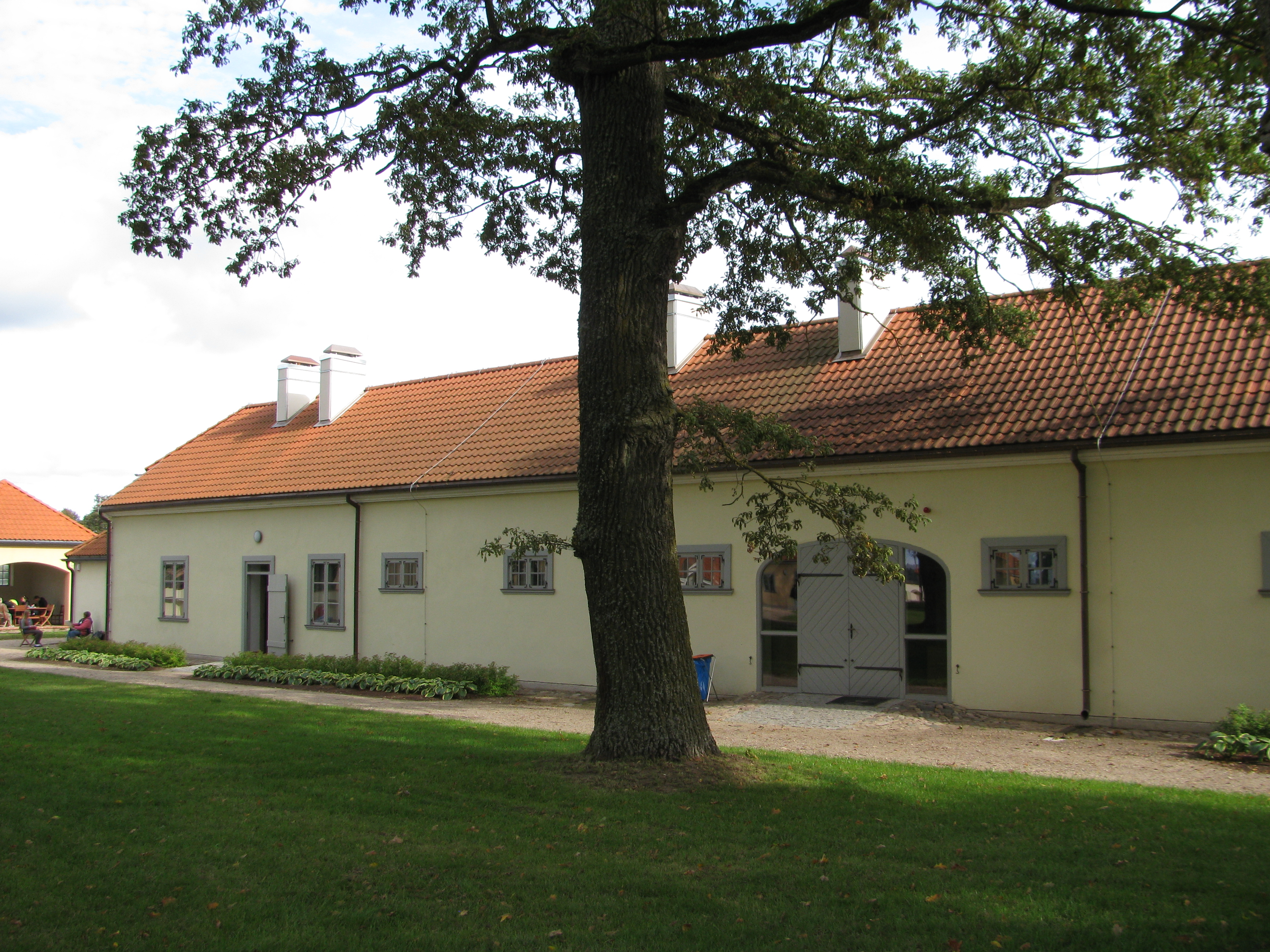
Former stables, now hotel

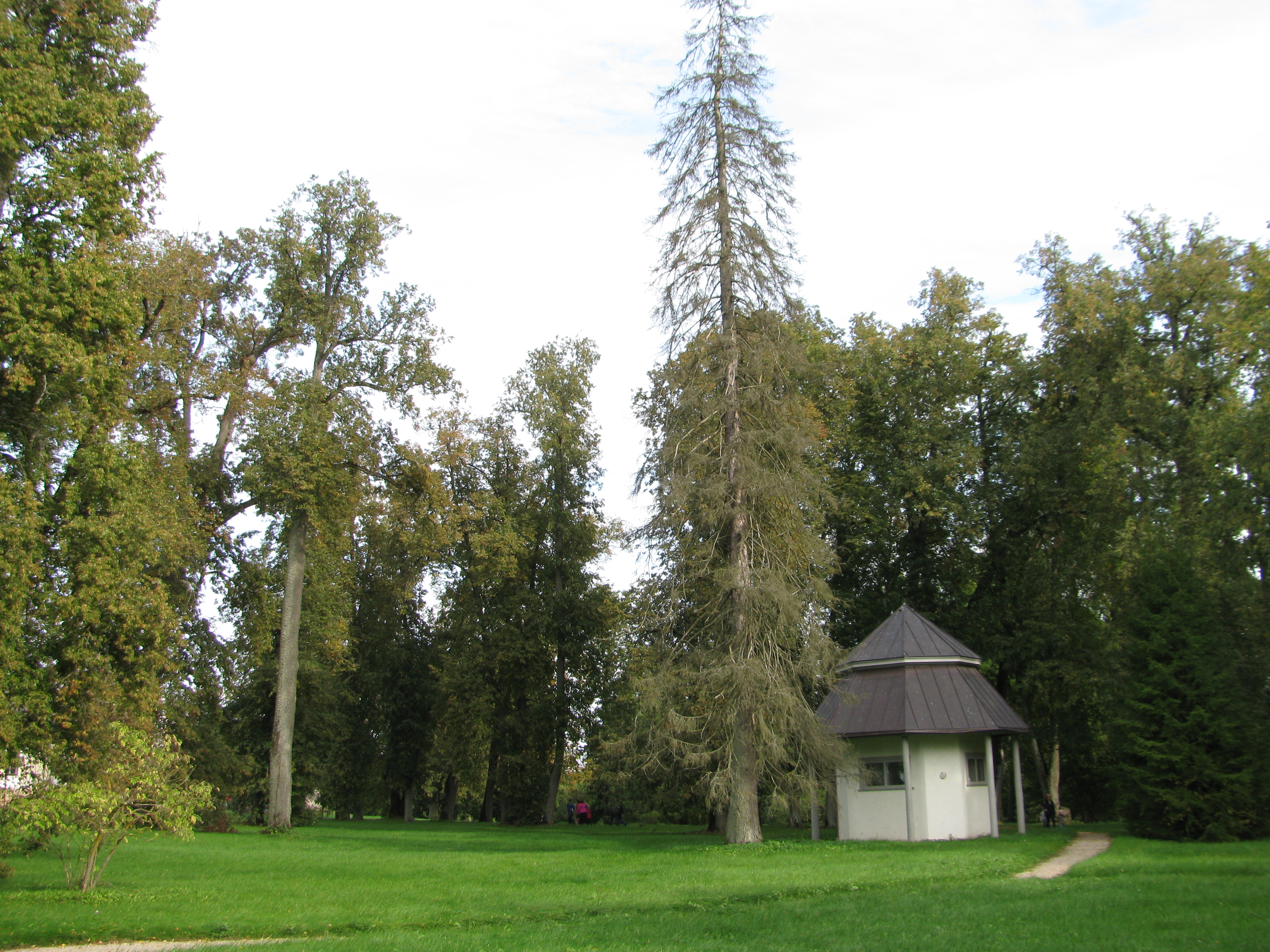
Manor park

== See also ==
- List of palaces and manor houses in Latvia
