= Zelma Cēsniece-Freidenfelde =

Latvian physician and politician

Member of the Constitutional Assembly
- In office 1920–1922

Personal details
- Born: 17 February 1892 Zaļenieki Parish, Russian Empire
- Died: 22 December 1929 (aged 37) Riga, Latvia

Zelma Cēsniece-Freidenfelde (17 February 1892 – 22 December 1929) was a Latvian physician and politician. In 1920 she was one of the six women elected to the Constitutional Assembly, Latvia's first female parliamentarians.

== Biography ==
Cēsniece-Freidenfelde was born in Zaļenieki Parish (now Jelgava Municipality) in the Courland Governorate in 1892 to Jānis Cēsnieks and Anna Ozola and qualified as a physician.

She was a founder member of the National Centre, which contested the 1920 Constitutional Assembly elections as part of the Group of Non-Partisan Citizens. Cēsniece-Freidenfelde was one of the members elected, serving in the Assembly until 1922. She was part of the central committee of the National Centre from 1921 until 1926. In 1922 she became the first head of the Latvian Women's National League. She died in December 1929.
