= Kalnciems =

Village in Latvia

- Village
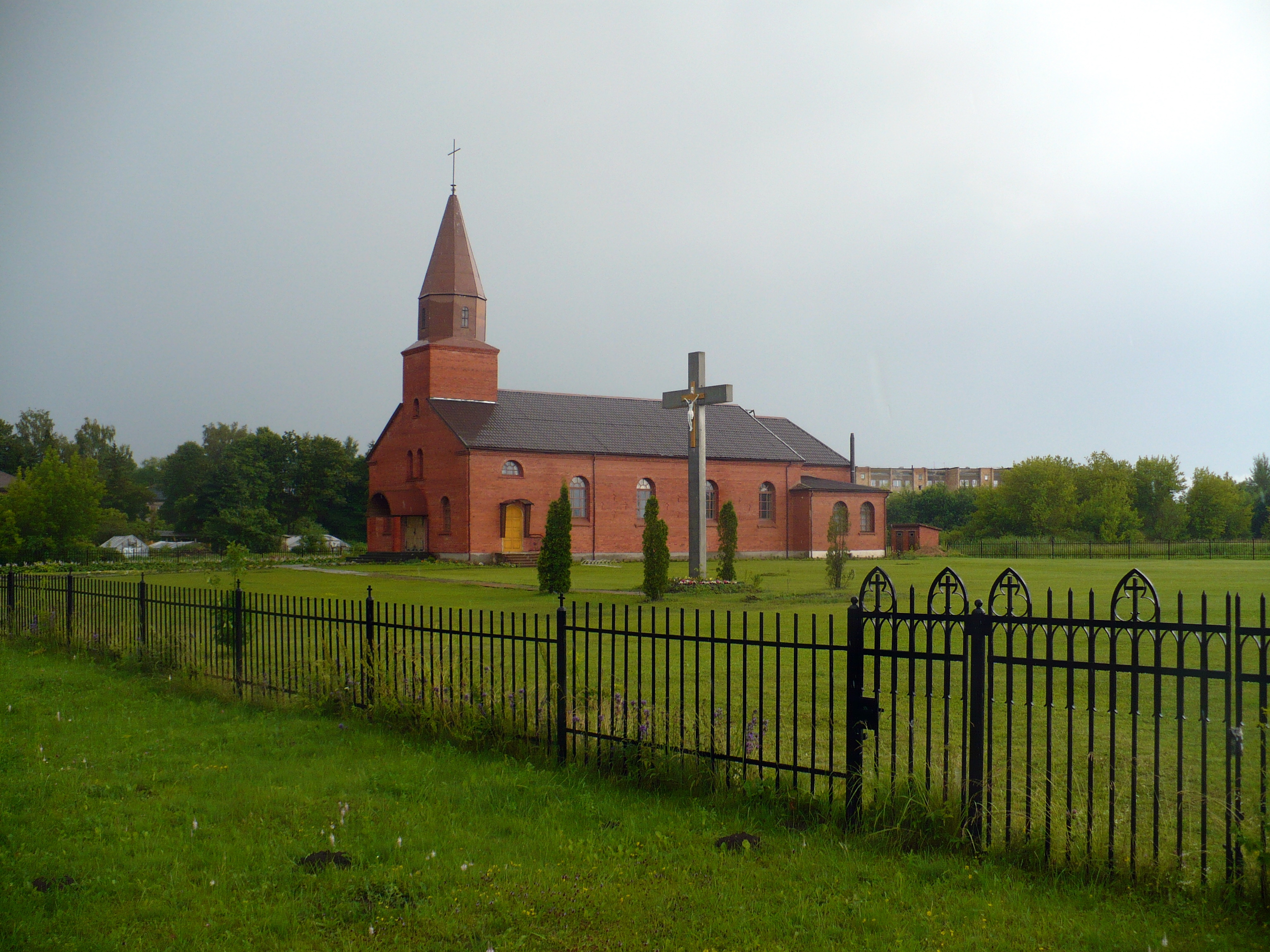
- Church in Kalnciems

- Flag Coat of arms

- Location in Latvia
- Coordinates: 56°50′N 23°35′E
- Country: Latvia
- Municipality: Jelgava Municipality
- Parish: Kalnciems Parish
- Town rights: 1991
- Lost town rights: 2010

Area
  - Total: 22.7 km^{2} (8.8 sq mi)
- Elevation: 2.9 m (9.5 ft)

Population
  - Total: 2,548
  - Density: 112/km^{2} (290/sq mi)
- Time zone: UTC+2 (EET)
  - Summer (DST): UTC+3 (EEST)
- Postal code: LV-3016
- Calling code: +371 630
- Website: http://www.kalnciems.lv/

Kalnciems is a village in Jelgava Municipality in the Semigallia region of Latvia. Located on the left bank of the Lielupe, 5 km south of the A9 motorway. Distance to Jelgava 24 km, to Riga - 49 km. Because of the dolomite and clay mines - in Kalnciems developed a big building materials industry center next to the Lielupe's waterway and by the end of the 19th century, the finished products were transported to Riga for its new buildings.

It had town rights from 1991 to 2010. The nearby Kalnciems Meadows is a natural habitat for fauna such as the corn crake, spotted crake, and black-tailed godwit.

== Name ==
The name comes from the Kalnciem's Manor House (Kalnzeem), which was first mentioned in the 16th century and the master's house was located on the opposite bank of the Lielupe - present-day Tīreļi, Valgunde's parish. In 1690, in the family manor house Ernst Johann von Biron was born. He later became the Duke of Courland and Semigallia and a regent of the Russian Empire.

== History ==
The locality at the present site was formed at the end of the 19th century when here was the largest Latvian clay bricks plant. In 1882, an entrepreneur and the mayor of Riga George Armitstead build first Hoffmann kiln for brick burning in Kalnciems. The largest brick factories until the First World War belonged to Nesterov, Krišjānis Ķergalvis and Peteris Radziņš. During the Russian-Japanese war, part of the brickwork was closed due to the construction stoppage, moreover, during the First World War, major battles were taking place near Kalnciems and most of the factories were destroyed.

However, in 1924 joint stock company "Ķieģelis un kūdra" ("Brick and peat") was established, as well as, Kalnciems' school. According to 1931 data in Kalnciems there was following companies - J. Šteiners Brick Factory, Smilgu lime kiln, J. Kleinberg lime kiln, H. Ronesal lime klin, Godmanis and Kroegers lime kiln, Stiļļa lime klin and joint stock company's "Silikāts" brick factory.

== See also ==
- List of former cities of Latvia
