= Kārlis Klāsups =

Latvian chess player (1922–1991)

Personal information
- Born: July 1, 1922 Zaļenieki parish, Jelgava Municipality, Latvia
- Died: August 1, 1991 (aged 69) Riga, Latvia

Chess career
- Country: Latvia; Soviet Union
- Title: National Master

Kārlis Klāsups (July 1, 1922, Zaļenieki parish – August 1, 1991, Riga) was a Latvian chess master who won Latvian Chess Championship in 1959.

== Chess career ==
Kārlis Klāsups participated in the Latvian Chess Championship finals 12 times. He won third place twice. (1950, 1955) but in 1959, Kārlis Klāsups reached the greatest success in own career and divided first place in this tournament with Pēteris Kampenuss. Kārlis Klāsups won additional match for Latvian title - 4:3. He has participated in USSR Chess Championship preliminary tournaments in 1955 and 1959 but without great success. Also, Kārlis Klāsups played for Latvia in 1955, at sixth board in 4th Soviet Team Chess Championship in Voroshilovgrad and won the third place (+2 −1 =6).

== Personal life ==
He worked as a crane driver at the port of Rīga. Because of poor health Kārlis Klāsups had to give up chess. After the end of his chess career, he lived alone and news of his death took a long time to reach the Latvian chess society.

== Notable games ==
- Kārlis Klāsups vs Mikhail Tal, Rīga 1950 Draw with the future 8th world champion.
- Kārlis Klāsups vs Mikhail Tal, Rīga 1953 Victory with sacrife over the future 8th world champion.
- Mikhail Tal vs Kārlis Klāsups, URS 1951 Endgame victory over the future 8th world champion.
