= Yakov Yakovlevich Elsis =

Latvian officer (1890–1917)

- Jēkabs Elsis
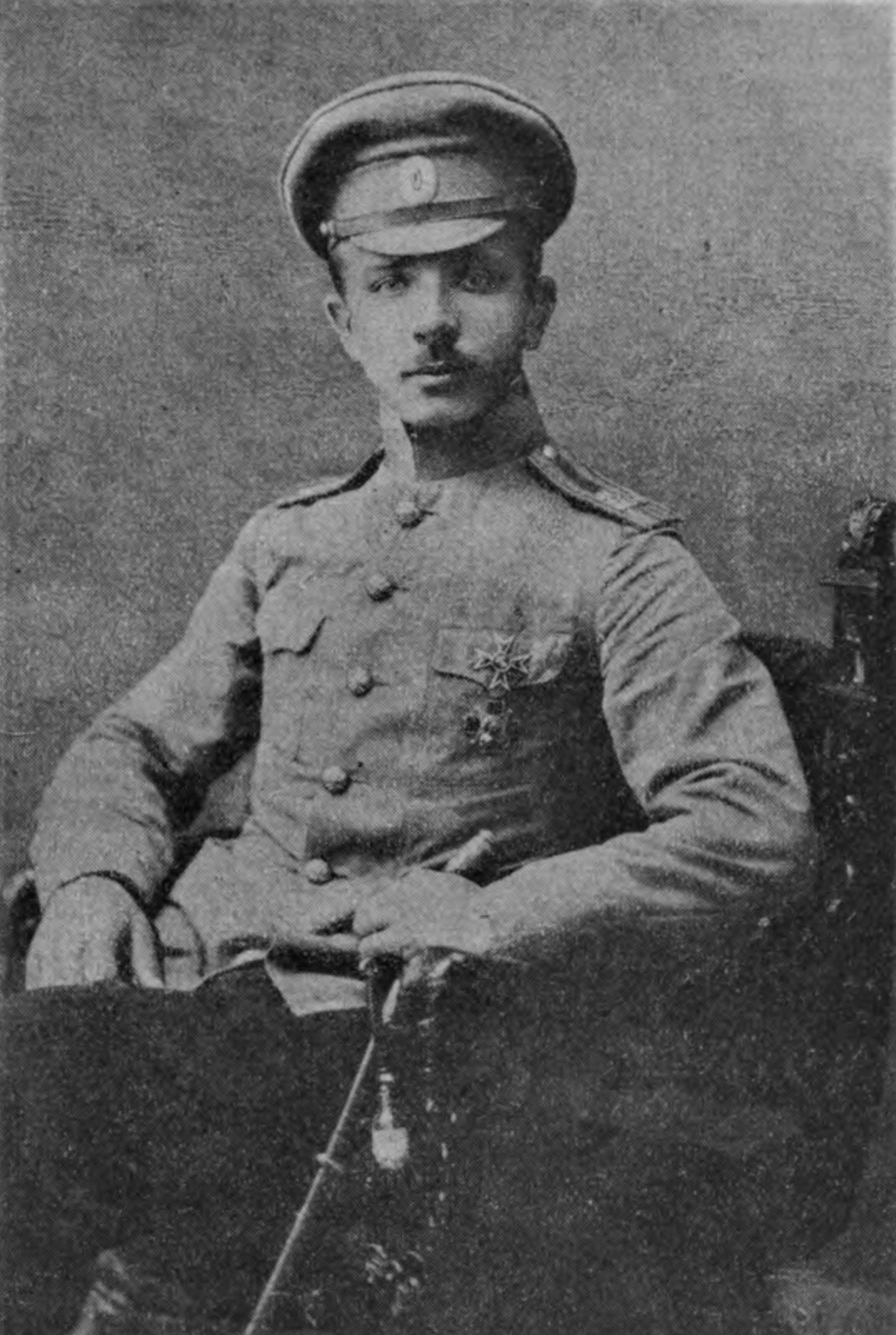
- Born: 25 December [O.S. 13 December] 1890; Valmieras apriņķis, Livonia Governorate, Russian Empire
- Died: 30 January 1917 (aged 26); Valgunde Parish, Courland Governorate, Russian Empire
- Military career
- Allegiance: Russian Empire
- Branch: Imperial Russian Army
- Service years: 1912–1917
- Rank: Captain
- Conflicts: World War I; Christmas Battles

Yakov Yakovlevich Elsis (Latvian: Jēkabs Elsis; 25 December [O.S. 13 December] 1890 – 30 January [O.S. 17 January] 1917) was a captain in the Imperial Russian Army and a Latvian Rifleman. He fought in World War I and was awarded the St. George Cross posthumously in 1917.

== Biography ==
Elsis was born on 25 December [O.S. 13 December] 1890 in Bauengof volost, Volmar district, Livonia Governorate, to a sharecropper family. Elsis was a Lutheran. In early childhood, he moved to Riga with his parents. He studied at the Riga Peter and Paul School, and graduated from the Alexander Gymnasium as an external student. Elsis served as an official in the Riga Regional Court.

He entered military service in the autumn of 1912 as a volunteer in the 48th Odessa Emperor Alexander I Infantry Regiment. In 1913, he was seconded to the Chuguev Military School, which he graduated from on 1 December 1914. He was transferred as an ensign to the 185th Infantry Reserve Battalion. On 3 August 1915, he was appointed company commander in the 3rd Latvian Kurzeme Rifle Battalion, with which he participated in all operations up until the Christmas Battles.

On 17 January 1917, Captain Elsis, commander of the 2nd Battalion of the 3rd Kurzeme Regiment, took part in repelling a counterattack by German troops at Machine Gun Hill, and was killed in this battle. By order of the Army and Navy on 11 September 1917, he was posthumously awarded the Order of St. George, 4th Class.

He was buried in Riga at the Sarkandaugava Cemetery.

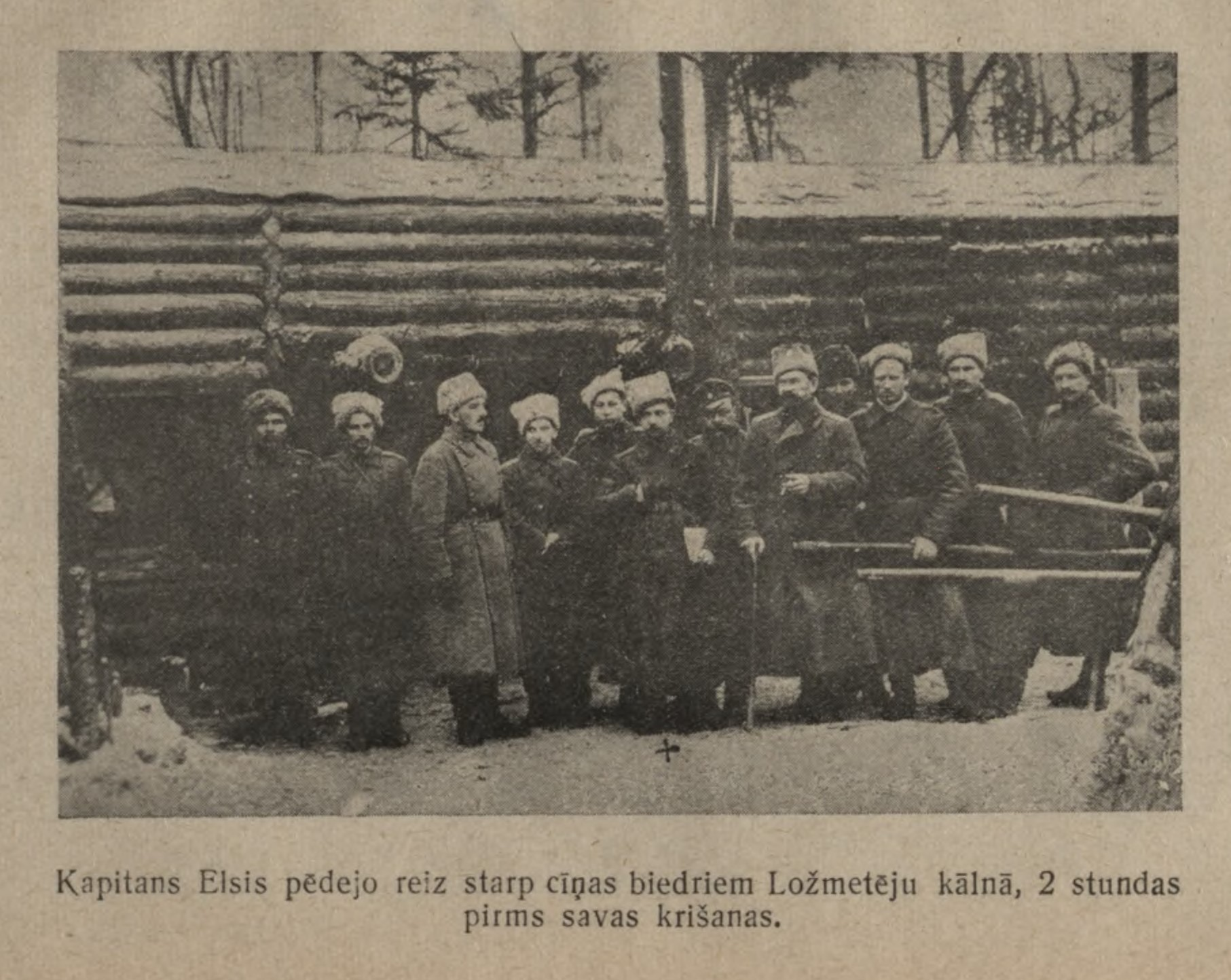
Yakov Elsis with his fellow soldiers at Machine Gun Hill on 17 January 1917, two hours before his death.

== Awards ==
- Order of St. Stanislaus, 3rd class (VP 28 September 1916)
- Order of St. Anna, 4th class (VP 11 October 1916)
- Order of St. Vladimir, 4th class with swords and bow
- Order of St. George, 4th class (PAF 11 September 1917, posthumously)
- Military Order of Lachlpesis 3rd class No. 1172, 14 January 1922, posthumously

== Family ==
Yakov's brother, Yan Yakovlevich Elsis (1895–1938), also served in the 3rd Kurzeme Regiment as a lieutenant and was awarded the St. George Cross, 4th class, No. 986219 with a laurel branch for the battles on the Maza-Yugla River in August 1917. He subsequently served in the Red Army as a colonel, a member of the All-Union Communist Party (Bolsheviks) since 1923, and the head of the 2nd department of the Transbaikal Military District headquarters. He was repressed and executed, and rehabilitated in 1957.

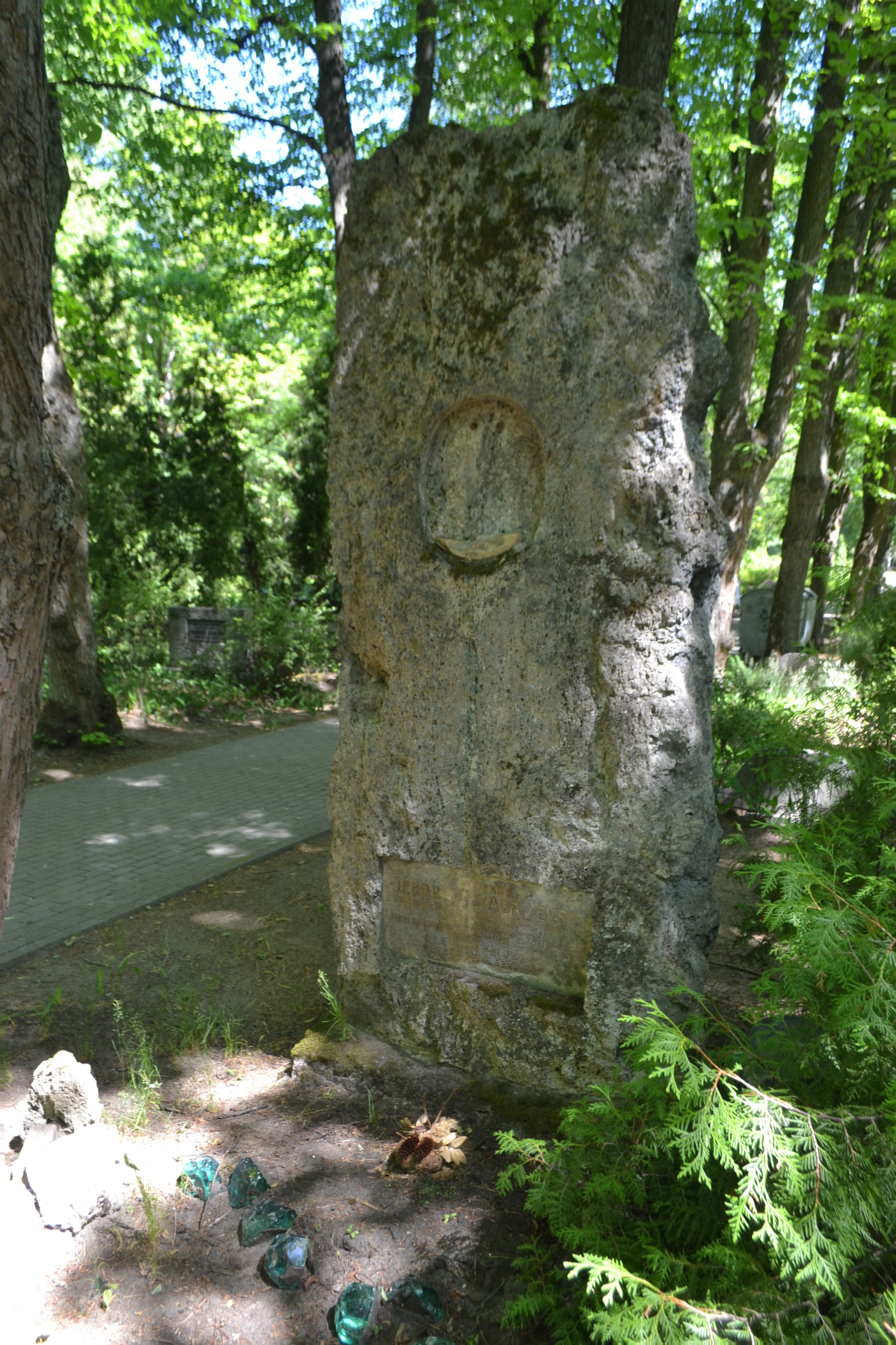
Elsis' grave at Sarkandaugava Cemetery

== Memory ==
On the initiative of his fellow soldiers, in May 1921 a special committee collected 40,000 Latvian rubles for a tombstone for Elsis, which was created by the firm of Ed. Kurau. The monument was unveiled on 6 January 1922. The bronze bas-relief was stolen.

Elsis' name as a knight of the Military Order of Lāčplēsis was immortalised in 2005 in the reliquary chapel of the Riga Brotherhood Cemetery, and in 2018 on a memorial stele at the Matiši Cemetery.

== Sources ==
- Kapitans Jēkabs Elsis / sakopojis un izdevis A. Burtnieks. — Rīga: Valters un Rapa, 1923.
- LKOK nr. 3/1172: Elsis, Jēkabs
- Lāčplēša Kara ordeņa kavalieri. Biogrāfiskā vārdnīca. — Rīga. 1995. 143.—144. lpp.
- Эльсис Яков Яковлевич — Офицеры русской императорской армии
