= List of former cities of Latvia =

Former cities of Latvia are entities that once had city rights and were located in the territory of Latvia. The main reasons why these entities have lost their status as cities of Latvia are destructions due to wars or mergers into larger entities.

City	City rights	Lost	Reason
Abrene	1933		Transferred to the Russian SFSR in 1944 by the Soviet regime. Now Pytalovo in the Russian Federation
Gostiņi	1933	1956	Merged into Pļaviņas
Grīva	1917	1956	Merged into Daugavpils
Kalnciems	1991	2010	The town and its rural territory was transformed into Kalnciems Parish
Krustpils	1920	1964	Merged into Jēkabpils
Ķemeri	1928	1959	Merged with Rīgas Jūrmala and Sloka to form Jūrmala
Lejasciems	1928	1939	Economic stagnation, status revoked by the Latvian government
Rauna	1590		Largely destroyed by warfare in the 17th century; present village since 1900
Rīgas Jūrmala	1920	1946	Merged into Riga; later merged with Ķemeri and Sloka to form Jūrmala
Sēlpils	1621	around 1705	Lost its significance after the Great Northern War; modern name – Vecsēlpils
Sloka	1785	1959	Merged with Rīgas Jūrmala and Ķemeri to form Jūrmala
Straupe	1356		Largely destroyed after the Polish–Swedish War (1600–1629)

== See also ==
- List of cities in Latvia
