= Brūno Kalniņš =

Latvian politician

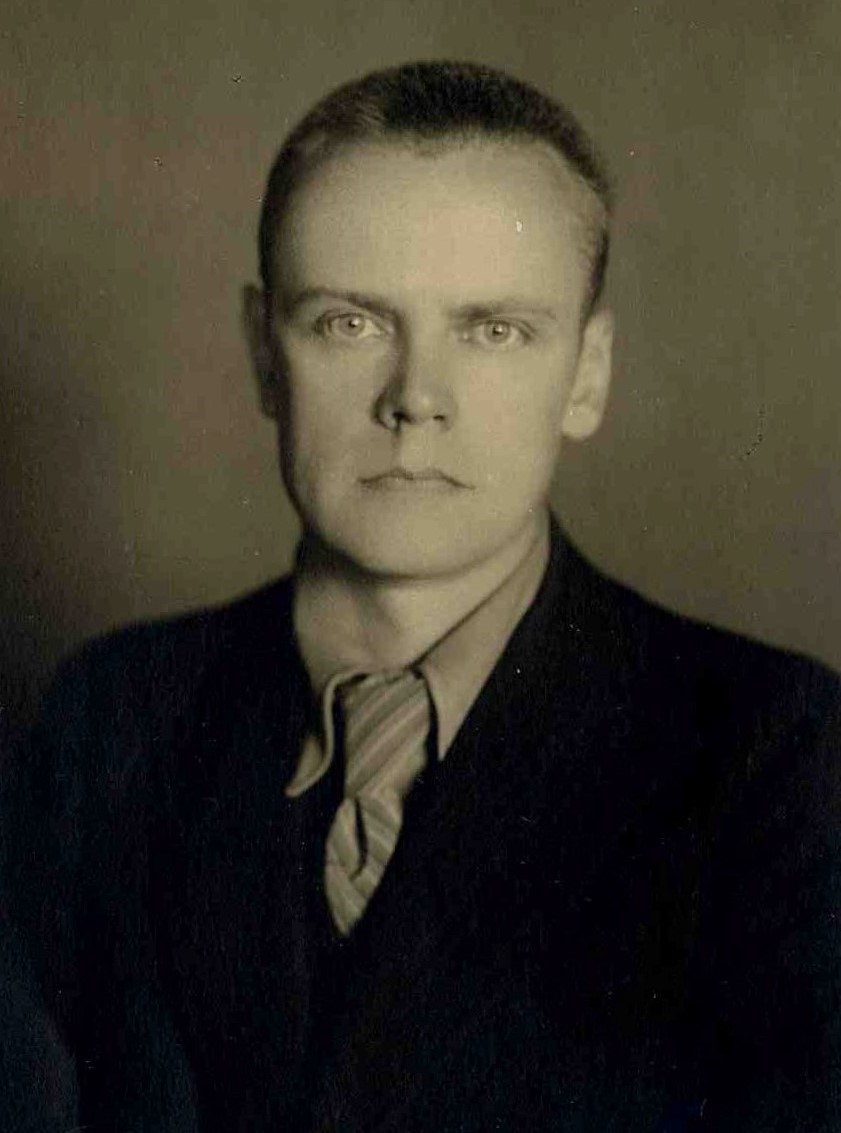
- Kalniņš in 1936

Deputy of the Saeima

Personal details
- Born: 7 May 1899 Tukums, Courland Governorate, Russian Empire (now Latvia)
- Died: 26 March 1990 (aged 90) Stockholm, Sweden
- Party: Latvian Social Democratic Workers' Party
- Education: Riga Technical University
- Profession: Engineer

Brūno (also: Bruno) Haralds Kalniņš (7 May 1898 – 26 March 1990) was a Latvian social democratic politician and historian. He was the son of prominent social-democratic politicians Pauls Kalniņš and Klāra Kalniņa.

== Political career ==
Kalniņš was one of the leading figures of the social-democratic youth movement in interwar Latvia, and an elected member of the Saeima. As a key social-democratic activist, he was arrested and exiled to Sweden as a result of the authoritarian coup d'état by Kārlis Ulmanis in 1934.

Kalniņš returned to Latvia in 1940 following the Soviet occupation, initially serving as a political officer of the Latvian Army (then renamed as the Latvian People's Army) in the run-up to the armed forces' full incorporation into the Red Army. Later, he became a lecturer in Marxist politics at the University of Latvia. During the occupation of Latvia by Nazi Germany, Kalniņš was arrested and sent to a Nazi concentration camp, but was released in 1944.

After World War II, he lived in Sweden, where he wrote several books on Baltic and Russian history and helped re-form the Latvian Social Democratic Workers' Party in exile. Although his later writings were critical of the Soviet régime in his homeland, many Latvians could not forgive him for his collaboration with the Soviets in 1940–41.
