= Vircava Parish =

Parish of Latvia

- parish of Latvia
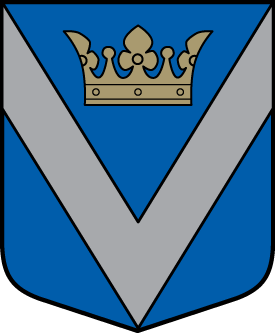
- Coat of arms

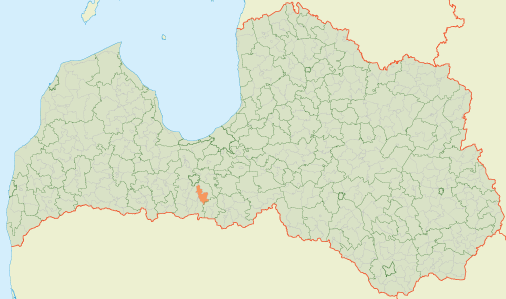
- Coordinates: 56°31′25″N 23°49′47″E
- Country: Latvia

Population (1 January 2026)
  - Total: 1,227
- Time zone: Eastern European Time

Vircava Parish (Latvian: Vircavas pagasts) is an administrative unit of Jelgava Municipality in the Semigallia region of Latvia.

== Towns, villages and settlements of Vircava parish ==
- Vircava - parish administrative center

== See also ==
- Kroņvircavas Manor
