= Kalnciems Parish =

Parish of Latvia

- parish of Latvia
- Flag Coat of arms

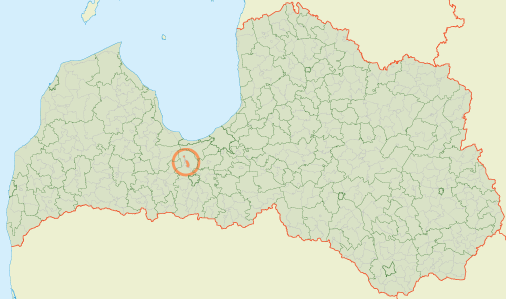
- 56°47′18″N 23°36′13″E
- Country: Latvia

Area
  - Total: 22.62 km^{2} (8.73 sq mi)
  - Land: 19.41 km^{2} (7.49 sq mi)
  - Water: 3.21 km^{2} (1.24 sq mi)

Population (1 January 2024)
  - Total: 1,790
  - Density: 79/km^{2} (200/sq mi)

Kalnciems Parish (Latvian: Kalnciema pagasts) is an administrative unit of Jelgava Municipality in the Semigallia region of Latvia (prior to the 2009 administrative reforms the Jelgava district). It was created in 2010 from the village of Kalnciems and its countryside territory, and is distinct from an earlier parish of the same name.
