= Lielplatone Parish =

Parish of Latvia

- parish of Latvia
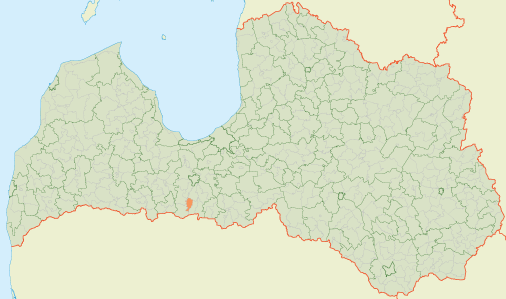
- Coordinates: 56°27′04″N 23°38′28″E
- Country: Latvia

Population (1 January 2026)
  - Total: 736
- Website: https://www.lielplatone.lv

Lielplatone parish (Latvian: Lielplatones pagasts) is an administrative unit of Jelgava Municipality in the Semigallia region of Latvia (prior to the 2009 administrative reforms the Jelgava district).

== Towns, villages and settlements of Lielplatone parish ==
The largest settlements are Lielplatone (parish center), Sidrabe (Mazplatone), Tīsi, Braņķi.

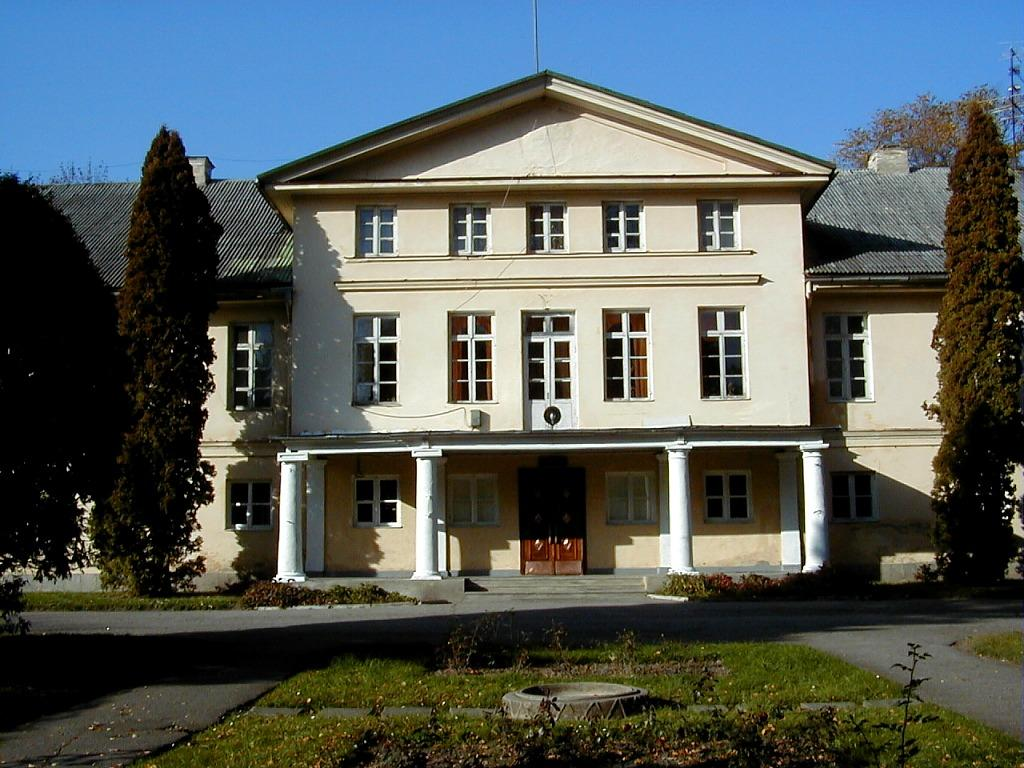
Lielplatone manor

== See also ==
- Lielplatone manor
