= Latvian Women's National League =

The National League of Latvian Women or Latvian Women's National League (Latvijas Sieviesu Nacionālā līga) was a Latvian women's organization.

As was the case in Estonia, women's rights had been a subject of public debate in the press since the 1880s, mainly in connection to the nationalism. As in the other Baltic countries however, no political organizations could exist prior to the introduction of Parliamentatism in Russia in 1905. A couple of smaller women's associations were founded after 1905, but they dealt with limited subjects.

The League was founded in Saint Petersburg in Russia in 1917. It was an ideological society for Latvian refugees with a national consciousness. In 1922, the League was renewed in Riga in independent Latvia. Zelma Cēsniece-Freidenfelde served as its first chairperson, followed by Berta Pipina. It mostly tended to charities for women and children. It maintained kinder gartens, provided care and health information for mothers and children, and provided evening courses for women; notably a two-year weaving courses.

The Latvian Women's National was a member of the International Council of Women.

In 1925, it became a part of the Council of Latvian women's organizations which was an umbrella organization for The National League of Latvian Women (1922), Assistant Corps of Latvian Women (1919), YWCA Young women's Christian Association, the Association of Academically Educated Latvian Women (1928), the Association of Latvian Theologians, the society «State Employee» and other women's associations: as a part of the umbrella organization, these associations worked to improve woman's position in family, work, society and state, and published a monthly, «Latvian Woman».
