= Aspazija =

Latvian poet and playwright (1865–1943)

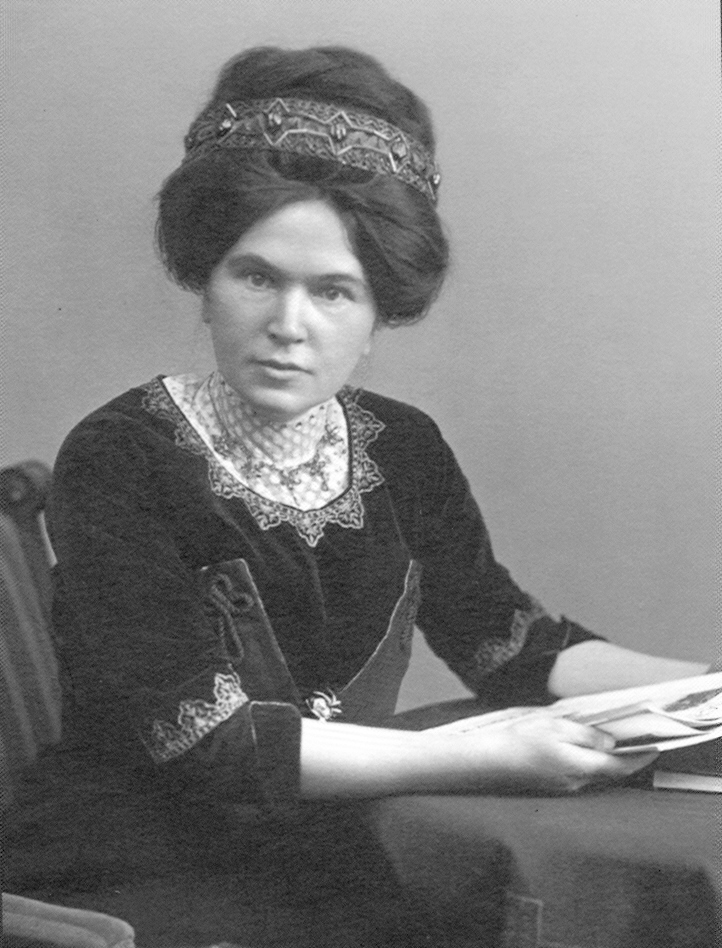
- Born: Elza Johanna Emilija Lizete Rozenberga; 16 March 1865; Zaļenieki parish, Russian Empire
- Died: 5 November 1943 (aged 78); Jūrmala, Generalbezirk Lettland (Nazi-occupied Latvia)
- Occupations: Poet; Playwright politician
- Movement: Romanticism
- Spouse: Rainis
- Awards: Order of the Three Stars; Cross of Recognition

Elza Johanna Emilija Lizete Pliekšāne (née Elza Rozenberga; 16 March 1865 – 5 November 1943), known by her pen name Aspazija, was a Latvian poet and playwright. Aspazija is the Latvian transliteration of Aspasia.

== Biography ==
Aspazija was born and raised in a wealthy peasant family in the Dobele county of Courland Governorate near Jelgava in 1865, where she studied and was active in youth organizations. She left the gymnasium during the last year of her studies, and in 1886, married Wilhelm Max Valter. Later, she became interested in literature, mainly by German authors. Her first publication appeared in 1887 in the newspaper Dienas Lapa. In 1891, she divorced her husband and, until 1893, worked as a private teacher in Jaunsvirlauka. In 1893, she settled in Riga and started to work as a journalist. In 1894, her first plays Vaidelote and Zaudētās tiesības were staged in Riga.

In those years she met Jānis Pliekšāns (better known as Rainis), a newspaper editor, poet, lawyer, and a leader of the New Current (Jaunā strāva) movement. Under his influence, Aspazija joined the New Current. The couple married in 1897 when they moved to Panevėžys, Lithuania, after the crackdown of New Current. In the same year, she published her first collection of poetry. For his activities, Rainis was imprisoned and later sentenced to five years in exile in Russia from 1897 to 1903, and Aspazija followed him. Together they translated, into Latvian, many works of Goethe. Later on, they returned to Latvia and continued writing, while Rainis also participated in socialist politics.

The 1905 Revolution began with protests in St. Petersburg in January. Within days, protests spread to Riga and many were killed on 13 January 1905. Aspazija's play "Vaidelote" (The Vestal) opened in January and was interpreted as a breakup call from Imperialist Russia. (Rainis also published a collection of revolutionary poems, called Vētras Sēja (The Sowing of the Storm).) The czar ordered a crack-down, and many revolutionaries were arrested and killed in 1905–1906. And so, Rainis and Aspazija fled to Switzerland and lived in exile in Castagnola from 1905 to 1920.

When they returned to independent Latvia after World War I, Aspazija was active in the feminist movement. She also joined the Latvian Social Democratic Workers' Party and was elected to the constitutional assembly. After Rainis died in 1929, Aspazija lived very privately in Riga or in her summer house in Dubulti. She died on 5 November 1943 in Dubulti, and was buried in the Rainis cemetery in Riga, next to her husband.

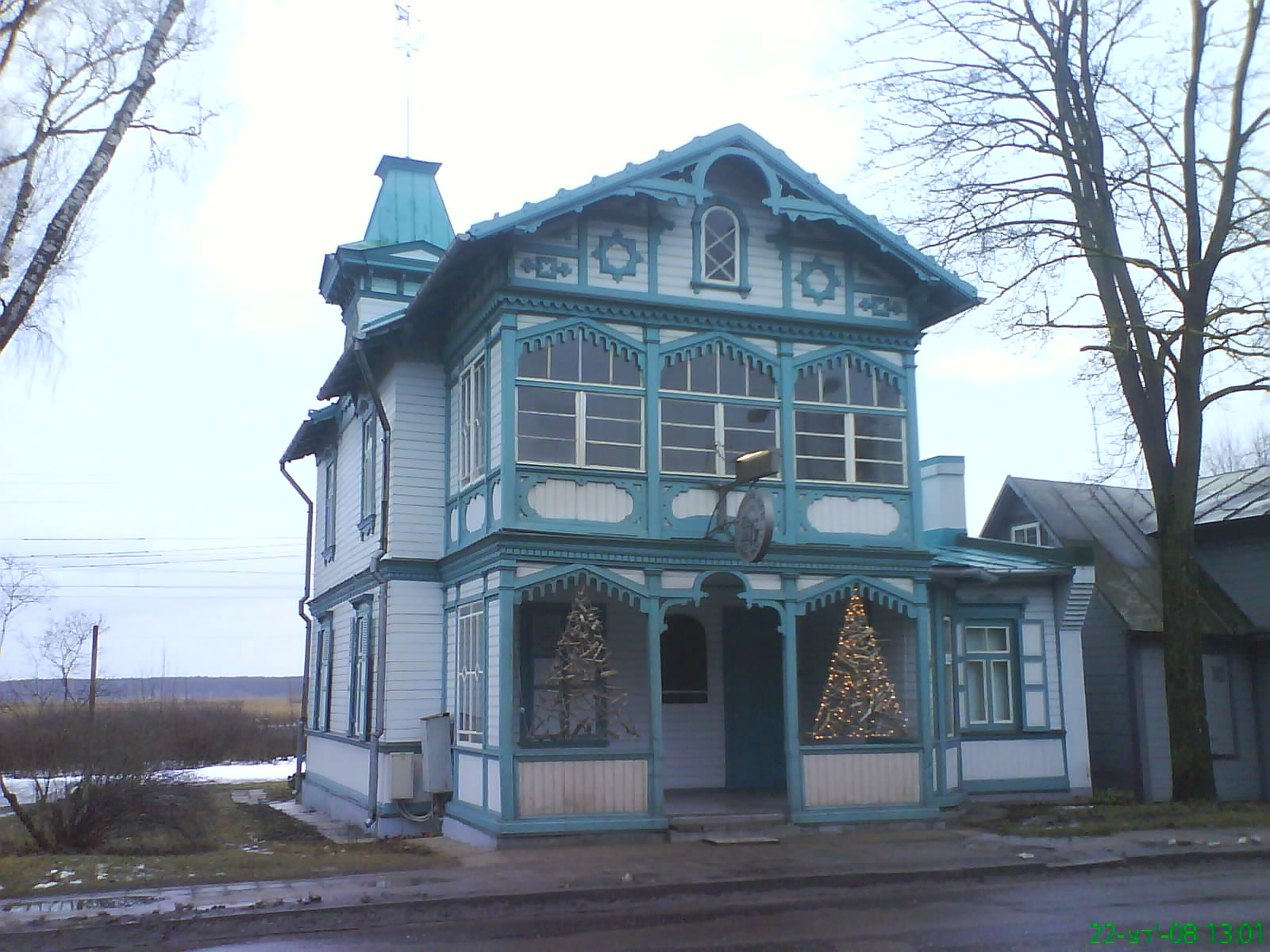
Aspazija's summer home in Dubulti

== Literary works ==
Aspazija's first works are realistic, but most of her work is neo-romantic. Some are a nostalgic look at the past. For example, the play Vaidelote (a female servant to gods in Lithuanian mythology), written in 1894, takes place in the 14th century Grand Duchy of Lithuania. The plays Simple Rights and Unattained Goals provoked many discussions because of their protest against the patriarchal society. The play Silver Veil (Sidraba šķidrauts) is considered to be her best work. In 1923, she wrote a play titled Aspazija.

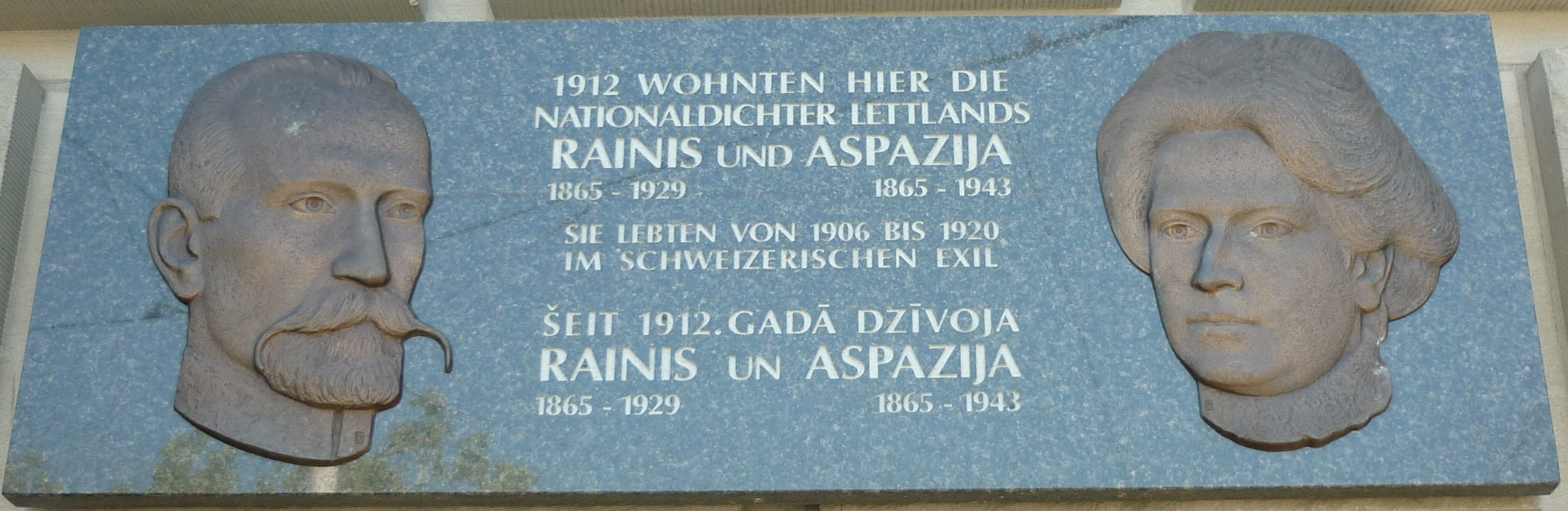
Memorial plaque of Rainis and Aspazija in Zurich, Switzerland

In the poetry compilation Red Flowers, simple and ordinary things are viewed in a romantic light. At the same time, her poems are full of light, fantasy, and rebellious moods. In Soul's Twilight (1904), pessimistic moods take over.

While living abroad, Aspazija wrote the poetry compilations Sunny Corner and Spread Wings, which have fewer social aspects and more intimate text, less rebellion against society, and more personal feelings.

Latvian composer Lauma Reinholde used Aspazija’s text for her song “Menestins Meloja.”

== Sources ==
- Aspazija. A Latvian Writer 1865–1943. Her Lyrical Prose. Translated by Astrida B. Stahnke. Jūrmalas vēstures un mākslas biedrība, 2015. ISBN 978-9934-144820.
- Stahnke, Astrida B. Aspazija: her life and her drama. Lanham, MD.: Univ. Press of America, 1984. ISBN 0-8191-3681-6; ISBN 0-8191-3682-4.
- Meskova, Sandra (2003). Two mothers of Latvian literature : Aspazija and Anna Brigadere. Journal of Baltic Studies. 34.3, 276–297.
- Nesaule, Agate (1992). What happened to Aspazija? In search of feminism in Latvia. Hecate. 18.2, 112–125. ISSN 0311-4198;
