= Jaunsvirlauka Parish =

Parish of Latvia

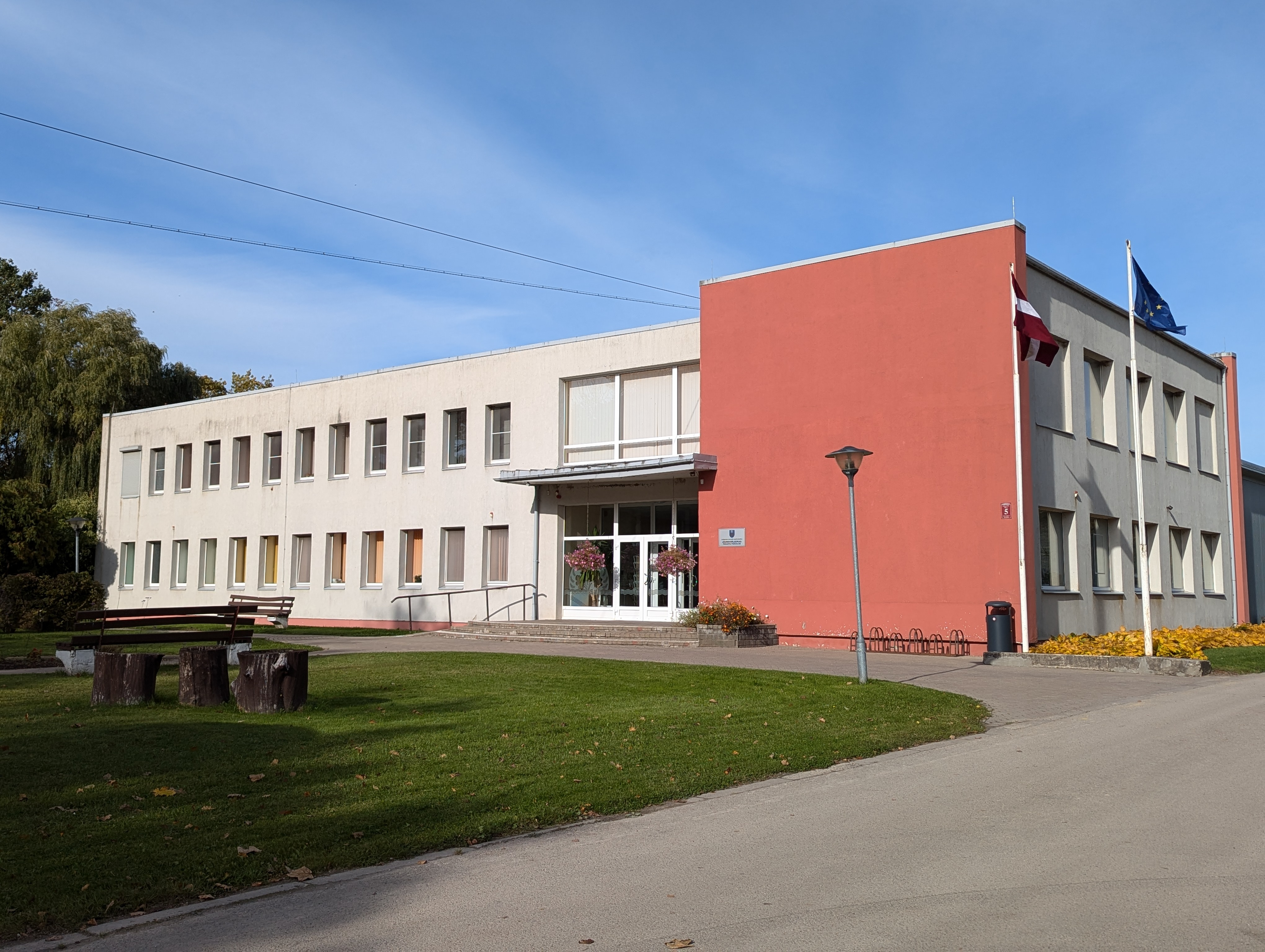
- Jaunsvirlauka Parish administration building
- Interactive map of Jaunsvirlauka Parish
- Coordinates: 56°34′11″N 23°53′44″E
- Country: Latvia
- Municipality: Jelgava

Area
  - Total: 123 km^{2} (47 sq mi)

Population (1 January 2026)
  - Total: 2,404
  - Density: 19.5/km^{2} (50.6/sq mi)

Jaunsvirlauka Parish (Latvian: Jaunsvirlaukas pagasts) is an administrative unit of Jelgava Municipality in the Semigallia region of Latvia.

== Towns, villages and settlements of Jaunsvirlauka parish ==
- Bajāri
- Bitēni
- Dravnieki
- Dzirnieki
- Īslīcas
- Jaunsvirlauka
- Kaķi
- Kārniņi
- Mežciems
- Pakuļi
- Pauļuki
- Staļģene
- Šalkas
- Vecsvirlauka
