= Council of Latvian Women's Organizations =

Organization based in Latvia

Council of Latvian women's organizations (Latvijas Sieviešu organizāciju padome) was a Latvian women's rights organization, founded in 1925.

It was an umbrella organization and united most of the women's organizations in Latvia during the interwar period; the National League of Latvian Women (1922), Assistant Corps of Latvian Women (1919), YWCA Young women's Christian Association, the Association of Academically Educated Latvian Women (1928), the Association of Latvian Theologians, the society «State Employee» and other women's associations.

It played a major part in interwar Latvian feminism, and campaigned to improve woman's position in family, work, society and state. It published a monthly, «Latvian Woman».
