= Glūda Parish =

Parish of Latvia

- parish of Latvia
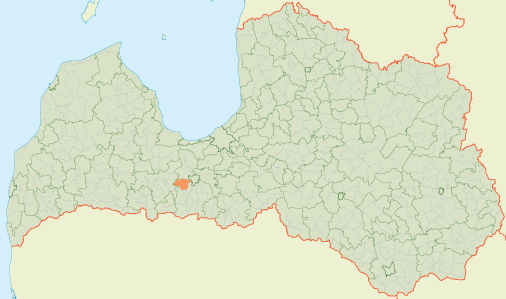
- Coordinates: 56°36′52″N 23°32′27″E
- Country: Latvia

Population (1 January 2026)
  - Total: 2,797
- Time zone: Eastern European Time

Glūda parish (Latvian: Glūdas pagasts) is an administrative unit of Jelgava Municipality in the Semigallia region of Latvia. The administrative center is Nākotne. It was an administrative unit of the Jelgava district.

== History ==
Historically in the territory of the modern Gluda municipality there were "Auzenburg" manor, Bramberģe Manor ("Brandenburg", Bramberģe), Drucke manor ("Druckenhof"), Kažmere manor ("Kasimirshof", Zemgale), Palcgrave Manor ( Pfalzgrafen ), Skibe Manor ( Alexandershof ).

Until 1925, Bramberg Parish or Bramberg Parish . In 1935 Jelgava County Gluda Parish had an area of 63.9 km² with a population of 1177. In 1945, the Dorupes and Glūdas [but the village council], but was liquidated in 1949. The village of Glūdas' was located in Jelgava (1949-1962, after 1967) and Dobele (1962-1967). In 1954, the liquidated Dorupe village and part of the Little village village were added to the village of Glude, and in 1963 kolkhoz «Cīņa (Strugle)» area was added to Svēte village. In 1974 part of Līvbērzes and Svēte village territory and part of Zaļenieki village kolkhoz «Zemgale» territory were added to Glūda village, in 1977 part Eastern village territories. In 1979 a part of the village was added to Livbērze village. In 1990 the village was reorganized into a parish. In 2009 Glūdas parish was included as administrative territory in Jelgava Municipality.

== Towns, villages and settlements of Glūda parish ==
- Bramberģe
- Dorupe
- Ģībotkalns
- Glūda
- Mežvidi
- Nākotne
- Smiltnieki
- Ūdeles
- Viesturciems
- Zemgale

== See also ==
- Bramberģe Manor
