= Valgunde Parish =

Parish of Latvia

- parish of Latvia
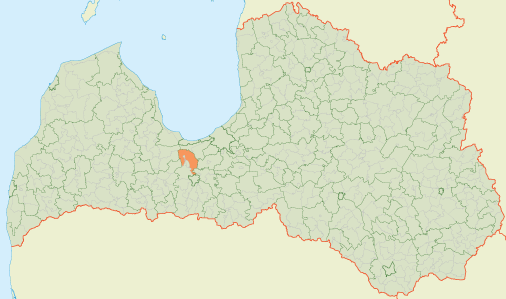
- Coordinates: 56°48′N 23°39′E
- Country: Latvia

Population (1 January 2026)
  - Total: 1,899

Valgunde Parish (Latvian: Valgundes pagasts) is an administrative unit of Jelgava Municipality in the Semigallia region of Latvia.

== Towns, villages and settlements of Valgunde Parish ==
- Valgunde – parish administrative center
