= Jelgava Municipality =

Municipality of Latvia

Coordinates: 56°39′09″N 23°43′22″E

Jelgava Municipality Jelgavas novads
- Municipality
- Flag Coat of arms

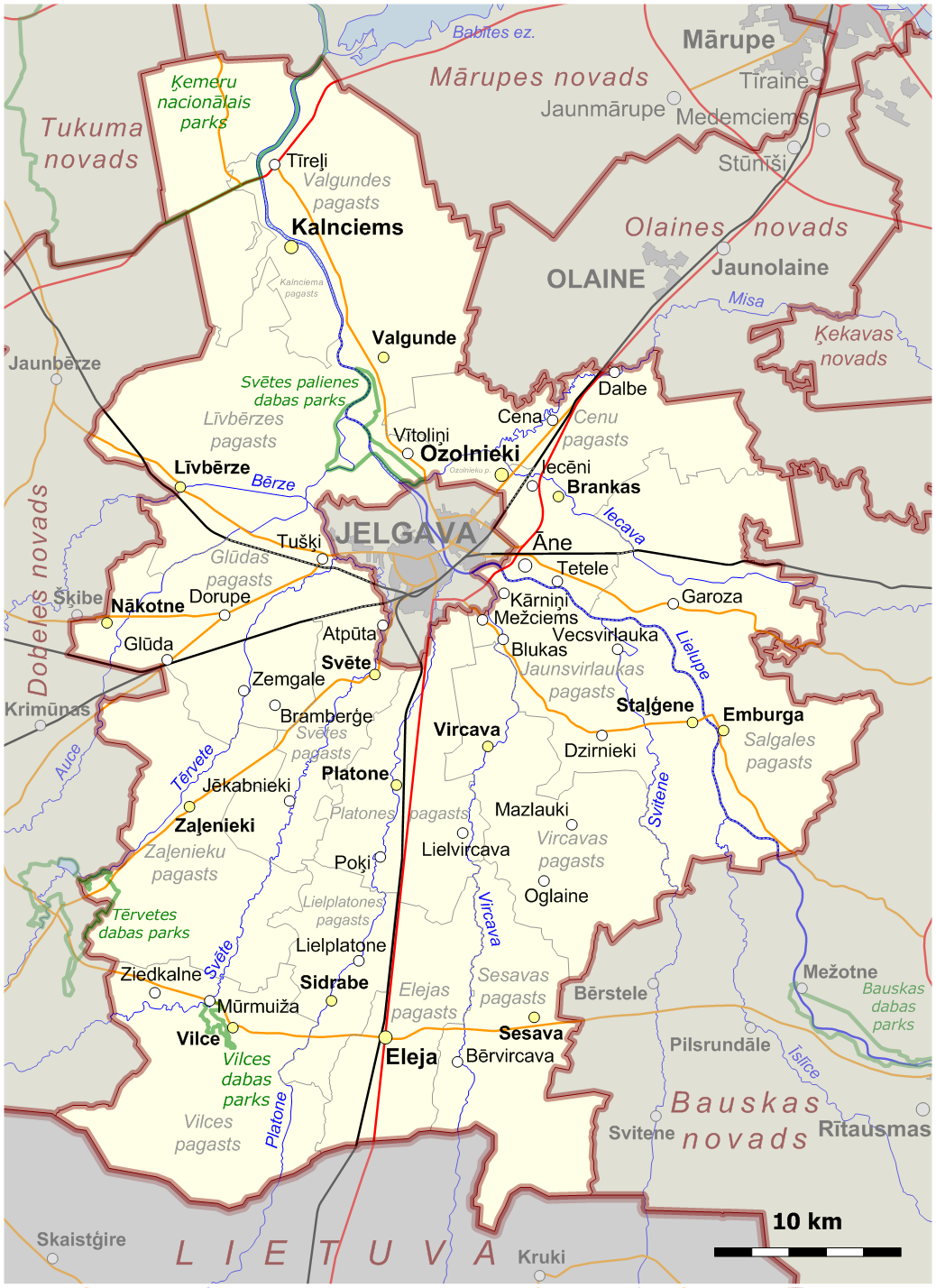
- Country: Latvia
- Formed: 2009
- Reformed: 2021
- Centre: Jelgava (extraterritorially)

Government
  - Council Chair: Ingus Zālītis (ZZS)

Area
  - Total: 1,604.09 km^{2} (619.34 sq mi)
  - Land: 1,541.44 km^{2} (595.15 sq mi)

Population (2026)
  - Total: 31,718
  - Density: 20.577/km^{2} (53.294/sq mi)
- Website: www.jelgavasnovads.lv/lv/

Jelgava Municipality (Latvian: Jelgavas novads) is a municipality in Zemgale, Latvia. Its administrative center is Jelgava, although it is extraterritorial as the city is a separate municipality of its own.

The municipality was formed in 2009 from Jelgava district by merging Eleja Parish, Glūda Parish, Jaunsvirlauka Parish, Lielplatone Parish, Līvbērze Parish, Platone Parish, Sesava Parish, Svēte Parish, Valgunde Parish, Vilce Parish, Vircava Parish, Zaļenieki Parish and Kalnciems town with its rural territory. As of 2020, the population was 21,738.

On 1 July 2021, Jelgava Municipality was enlarged when Ozolnieki Municipality and its parishes were merged into it during the Latvian administrative reform of 2021. It borders Lithuania.

== Twin towns — sister cities ==
Jelgava Local Municipality is twinned with:

- Alytus, Lithuania
- Argeș County, Romania
- Fundão, Portugal
- Glodeni District, Moldova
- Joniškis, Lithuania
- Rava-Ruska, Ukraine
- Recklinghausen, Germany
- Suwałki, Poland
- Wodzisław County, Poland

== Notable people ==
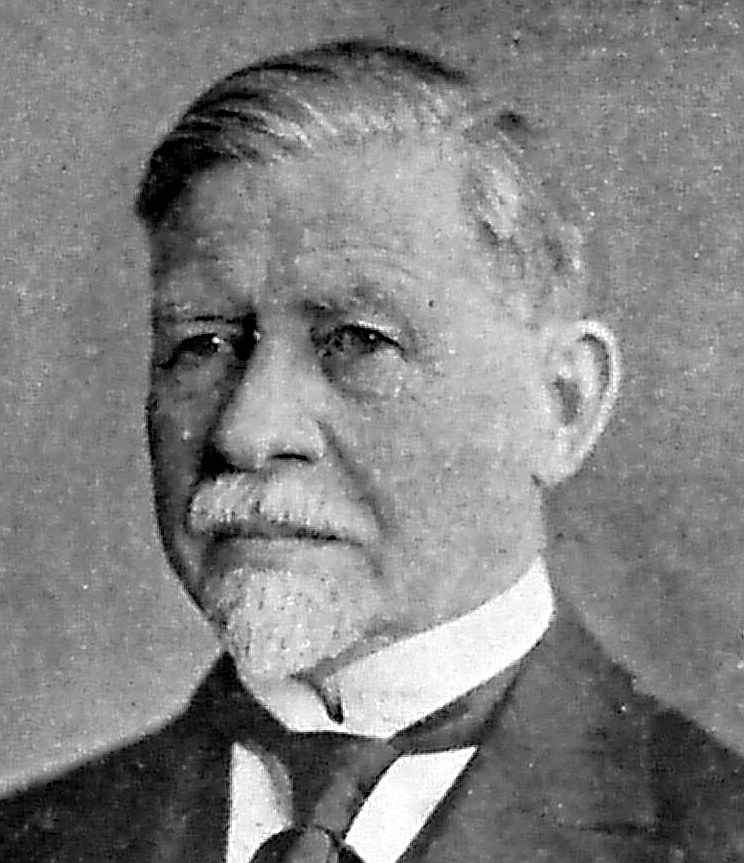
Jānis Pauļuks, 1920's

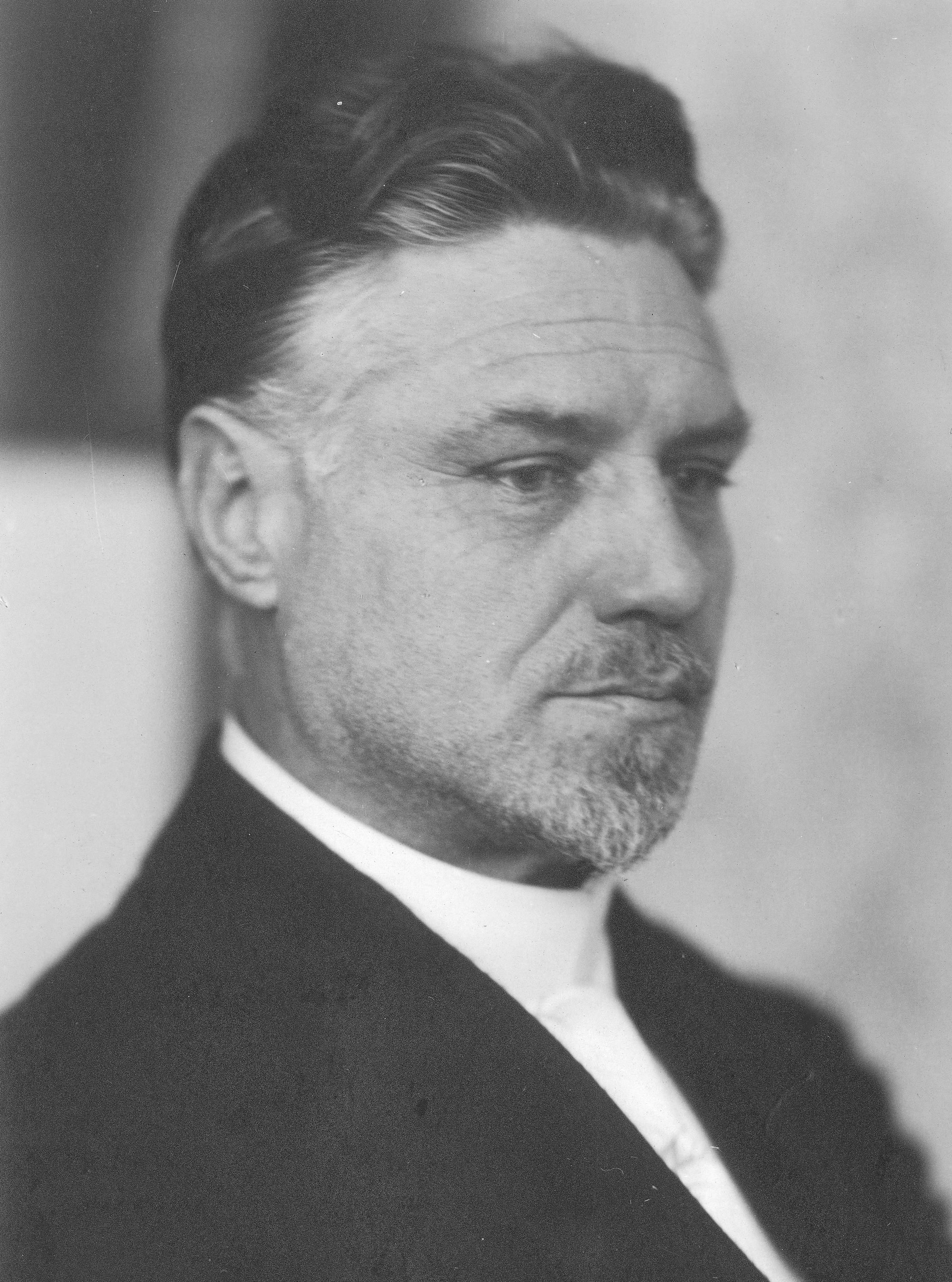
Pauls Kalnins, ca 1930

- Ernst Johann von Biron (1690 in Kalnciems – 1772), Duke of Courland and Semigallia, 1737 to 1740 & 1763 to 1769.
- Duchess Elisabeth Alexandrine of Württemberg (1802 in Vircava Parish – 1864), duchess
- Elza Johanna Emilija Lizete Pliekšāne (1865 in Zaļenieki Parish – 1943), pen name Aspazija, a Latvian poet and playwright.
- Jānis Pauļuks (1865 in Sesava Parish – 1937), politician, Prime Minister of Latvia, 1923
- Pauls Kalniņš (1872 in Vilce Parish – 1945), physician and politician, acting President of Latvia (1927, 1944–1945).
- Pēteris Juraševskis (1872 in Sesava parish – 1945), Prime Minister of Latvia, in 1928
- Klāra Kalniņa (1874 in Vanci – 1964), a Latvian feminist, suffragette, editor, and politician
- Edvarts Virza (1883 in Salgale Parish – 1940), writer, poet and translator, nominee for the Nobel Prize in Literature
- Ludvigs Bolšteins (1888 in Sesava Parish – 1940), a Latvian general, commander of the Latvian border guard, 1928 to 1940
- Zelma Cēsniece-Freidenfelde (1892 in Zaļenieki Parish – 1929), physician and politician, the first head of the Latvian Women's National League
- Jānis Polis (1938 in Eleja Parish – 2011), pharmacologist, early developer of the synthesis of rimantadine
- Lolita Čigāne (born 1973 in Ozolnieki), journalist, politician and consultant on policy in elections

=== Sport ===
- Alberts Rumba (1892–1962), a Latvian speed skater who competed in the 1924 Winter Olympics
- Mārtiņš Mazūrs (1908 in Vircava Parish – 1995), cyclist, competed in the 1936 Summer Olympics
- Kārlis Klāsups (1922 in Zaļenieki parish – 1991), a Latvian chess master who won Latvian Chess Championship in 1959.
- Aldons Vrubļevskis (born 1957 in Zaļenieki Parish), lawyer, sports official & president Latvian Olympic Committee, from 2004 to 2020
- Reinis Bērziņš (born 2001, brought up in Ozolnieki), short-track speed skater, competed in the 2022 & 2026 Winter Olympics
