= Zaļenieki Parish =

Parish of Latvia

- parish of Latvia
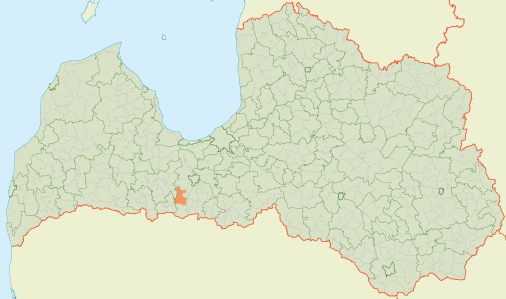
- 56°30′28″N 23°30′45″E
- Country: Latvia

Area
  - Total: 122.55 km^{2} (47.32 sq mi)
  - Land: 120.93 km^{2} (46.69 sq mi)
  - Water: 1.62 km^{2} (0.63 sq mi)

Population (1 January 2025)
  - Total: 1,402
  - Density: 11.59/km^{2} (30.03/sq mi)

Zaļenieki Parish (Latvian: Zaļenieku pagasts) is an administrative unit in the western part of Jelgava Municipality in the Semigallia region of Latvia. It borders the Parishes of Glūda, Svēte, Lielplatone, Vilce, Tērvete, and Augstkalne. Rivers Auce, Dorupīte, Eglone, Svēte, and Tērvete flow through Zaļenieki.

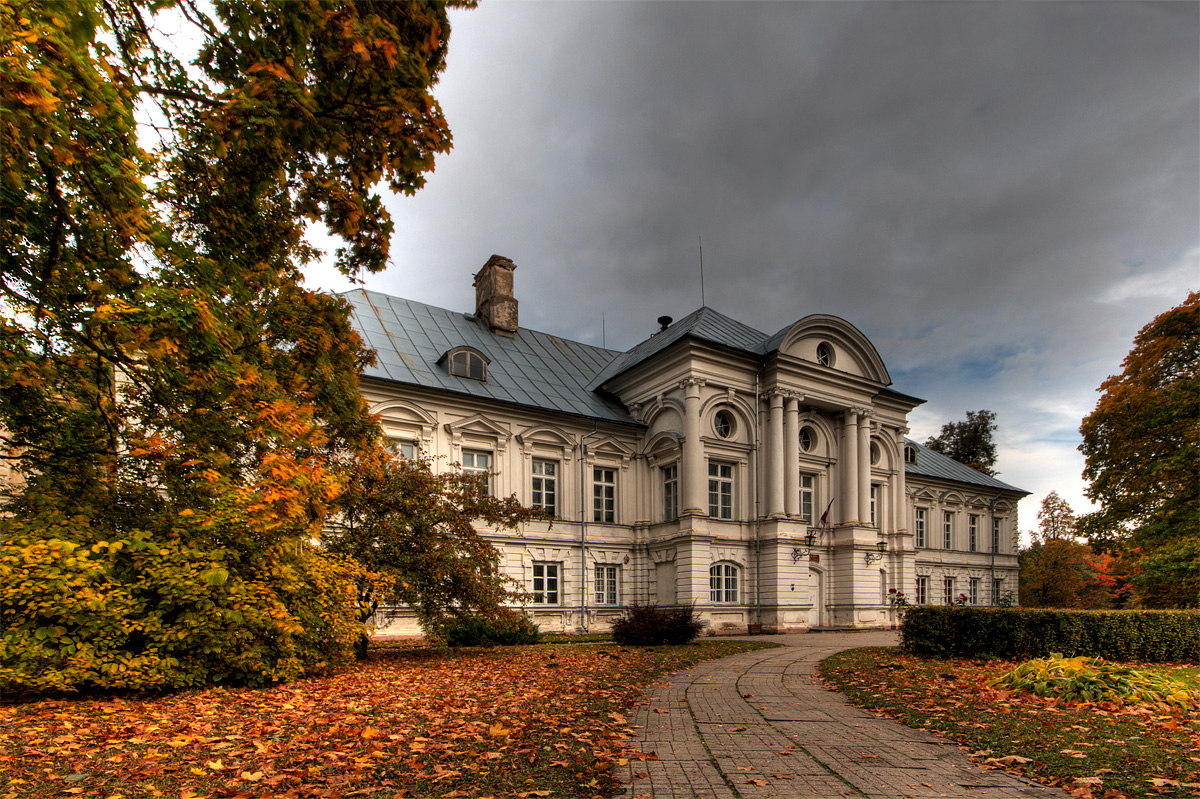
Zaļenieki manor house

Municipality	Jelgavas Novads
Administreative Centre	Zaļenieki
Area	122,83 km2
Population (2010)	690
Population Density	13.8 per km2

== Towns, villages and settlements of Zaļenieki parish ==
Zaļenieki, Spurģi, Ūziņi, Apgunste.

== Notable people ==
- Poet Aspazija (1865 - 1943) was born in Daukšas, Zaļenieki Parish
